= List of foreign Segunda División de Fútbol Salvadoreño players =

This is a list of foreign players in Segunda Division (Liga Ascenio) which commenced play in 1999.. The following players:

1. Have played at least one Segunda Division regular season game. Players who were signed by Segunda Division clubs, but only played in playoff games or did not play in any competitive games at all, are not included.
2. Are considered foreign, i.e., outside El Salvador determined by the following:

A player is considered foreign if he is not eligible to play for the national team of El Salvador.

- If a player has been capped on international level, the national team is used; if he has been capped by more than one country, the highest level (or the most recent) team is used. These include Salvadoran players with dual citizenship.
- If a player has not been capped on international level, his country of birth is used, except those who were born abroad from El Salvador parents, or El Salvador at a young age, and those who clearly indicated to have switched his nationality to another nation.

In bold: players who have played at least one Segunda Division game in the current season (2020 Apertura season), and are still at the clubs for which they have played. This does not include current players of a Segunda division club who have not played a Segunda division game in the current season.

== Naturalized Players (Note: Players that have been born abroad, moved to El Salvador later than the age of twelve, acquired El Salvador citizenship and waived the opportunity to play for the national teams of their native countries in order to be eligible to play for El Salvador) ==
- (Mexico) Rafael Acosta - Santa Tecla
- (United States) Steve Benitez - La Asuncion
- (Colombia) Elder José Figueroa (*) - Juventud 72, Inca Super Flat, UDET, Fuerte San Francisco, Vista Hermosa, Aspirante, Once Municipal
- (Honduras) Williams Reyes (*) - Aspirante
- Brayan Gil (*) - Brujos de Izalco
- Cristian Gil (*) - Brujos de Izalco, Platense
- Mayer Gil (*) - AD Destroyer

== Africa – CAF ==
=== Ghana ===
- James Owusu-Ansah - Once Lobos

=== Nigeria ===
- Evans Ikpeoha - Independiente F.C., Fuerte San Francisco
- George Martin Ankamah - Aspirante

=== Togo ===
- Fábio Pereira de Azevedo (*) - Platense

== South America – CONMEBOL ==
=== Argentina ===
- Dante Alejandro - Jocoro
- Gabriel Álvarez - Atletico Marte, Telecom
- Maximiliano Ayala - Real Destroyer
- Dionel Bordón - A.D. Municipal
- Rodrigo Brito - Turin FESA
- Jonathan Cerrutti - Titan
- Roberto “Teto” Chanampe - FAS Candelareño
- Matías Colouca - Atletico Marte, Juayua
- Carlos Daniel Escalante – Acajutla FC, Juventud Independiente
- David Fasil - Topiltzin
- Gustavo Ariel Gómez - España ADESSE
- Marcelo González - Atlético Chaparratique
- Cesar Horst - Real Destroyer
- Pablo Leguizamo - Atlético Chaparratique
- Carlos Javier Martino - Inca Super Flat
- Maxi Morales - Dragon
- Cristobal Post - Atletico Marte
- Javier Rabbia - Once Lobos, Titam
- Lucas Reynoso - Once Municipal
- Gaston Rios - Once Lobos
- Dante Segovia - Once Lobos

=== Brazil ===
- Anderson Passos Batista - Isidro Metapan
- Dimas Braz - Once Municipal
- João Carlos Da Silva - El Roble, Independiente F.C.
- Paulo César Rodrigues de Lima - Pasaquina, Aspirante
- Felipe Messías - Dragon, La Asuncion
- Alexander Da Silva - A.D. Municipal
- Mauricio Do Santos - Once Municipal
- Luis Sergio Pereira - Aspirante
- Rodinei Martins - Dragon
- Augusto César - Platense
- Daniel Prediguer - Dragon
- Luis Felipe Ruis Tapias - Aspirante
- Josielson Moraes Silva - Fuerte San Francisco, Dragon
- Junior Dos Santos - Independiente F.C.
- Igor Dos Santos - Independiente F.C., Liberal, Rácing Jr
- Noe dos Santos - Isidro Metapan
- Eriko - Ilopaneco
- Evandro dos Santos -Once Lobos
- Jackson de Oliviera - Rácing Jr, Juayua, Dragon
- Philipinho Pedorrinho - Liberal
- **Paulo Silva** - Pipil
- Regis Da Silva - A.D. Municipal
- Jadyr Da Sliva Santos - Racing jr
- Josielson Moraes - Gerardo Barrios

=== Chile ===
- Carlos Hoffman - Vendaval

=== Colombia ===
- **Argenis Alba** - Marte Soyapango, Neo Pipil
- Orlando Alba - Atletico Marte
- Carlos Anchico - A.D. Municipal, Chalatenango
- Duban Andrade - Once Lobos
- Andrés Medina Aguirre - Vendaval, Topiltzin
- Wilber Yojair Arizala - Topiltzin, Platense
- Carlos Asprilla - Jocoro
- José Bautista Balanta - Aspirante
- Brayan Bermudez - Cacahuatique
- Juan Bonilla - Marte Soyapango, Vendaval
- Teodulo Bonilla - Vendaval
- Jefferson Bueno - UDET
- Cristian Caicedo - Once Lobos, Tiburones de Sonsonate
- **Luis Caicedo** - Olímpico Litoral
- Deyner Cañate - Ciclon del Golfo, Aspirante
- Emerson Cangá - Liberal
- Juan Camilo Carabali - San Pablo Tacachico
- John Castillo (footballer) - Dragon
- Luis Castillo - Vendaval
- Daniel Andres Castrillon - - Aspirante
- Juna Chann - Santa Rosa Guachipilín
- Juan Manuel Charry - Atletico Marte
- Devier Chaverra - Titan, Zacatecoluca
- Nicolás Claros - Atletico Marte
- Victor Contreras - Gerarado Barrios, Topiltzin
- Stibin Cuesta - Once Lobos
- Alexis D'Abuisson - Vendaval
- Juan Camilo Delgado - San Pablo Tacachico, Platense, Once Lobos, El Roble
- Andres Diaz - Brasilia, Audaz, Aspirante
- Bladimir Díaz - Chalatenango, Once Lobos, Fuerte Aguilares
- Lucas Diaz - Brujos de Izalco
- Juan Escobar - Fuerte San Francisco
- Rober Espinal - Marte Soyapango
- Marcó Tulio Gallego - Aspirante
- Daniel García- San Pablo Tacachico
- Antony Gómez - El Roble
- Camilo Gómez - Once Municipal, Ilopaneco
- Cristian Gomez - Cacahuatique, Ilopango FC
- Fredy Gonzales - Marte Soyapango, Brasilia, Sonsonate, Chalatenango, 33
- Nildeson Gonzales - Independiente
- Nito Gonzales - Arcense
- Cristian Gonzalez Grueso - Vendaval
- Roger Guerrero - Titan
- William Guerrero - Chalatenango, Marte Soyapango, Real Destroyer, Once Municipal, Platense, Vendaval, Atletico Marte, Topiltzin
- Anderson Herrera - Ilopaneco
- Diomer Hinestroza - Topiltzin, El Vencedor, Liberal, El Vencedor
- **Victor Manuel Hinestroza** - Cruzeiro, Batanecos
- Dylan Hurtado - Titan
- Mayer Gil Hurtado - Brujos
- Fernando Landazuri - Cacahuatique
- Héctor Luis Lemus - Aspirante, Independiente F.C., Juayua (Municipal FC)
- Sebastián Macasaet - Real Destroyer
- Jhon Emiro Machado - El Vencedor, Marte Soyapango
- Fary Mancilla - Independiente F.C., Gerardo Barrios
- Yohanny Mancilla - Fuerte San Francisco, Aspirante, Audaz
- Jorman Martinez - San Pablo Tacachico, Fuerte Aguilares
- Brayan Bermudez Mazo - Cacahuatique
- Edgar Medrano - Juayua FC
- **Jose Medrano** - Titan, Topiltzin, Juventud Independiente
- Daley Mena - Inter Sivar
- Michel Mercado - El Roble
- Dago Alberto Milla - Topiltzin
- Neimer Miranda - Once Municipal, El Roble
- Alexander Tejada Molano - Once Lobos
- **Johni Moran** - ADET-Aruba
- Juan Carlos Morelos - Atiquizaya
- Alvaro Moreno - Vendaval
- Leider Moreno - La Asuncion
- Alexis Mosquera - Once Lobos
- Cristian Ali Gil Mosquera - Once Lobos, Audaz, Brujos de Izalco, Fuerte San Francisco
- Fernando Mosquera
- Jhon Mosquera - C.D. Aspirantes
- Victor Mosquera - Vendaval
- Oscar Motoa - Marte Soyapango, Brasilia, Ilopaneco
- Luis Aroleda Murillo - Cacahuatique
- **Manuel Murillo** - Cangrejera, Los Laureles, Atletico Balboa
- Juan Diego Navarrete - Espartano
- Alexander Obregón - Ágape TV
- **Bryan Obregon** - Rácing Jr, San Pablo Tacachico, INCA, Espartano
- Breiner Ortiz - Once Lobos, Titan
- Sebastián Ortiz - Ilopaneco
- Gerson Páez - A.D. Municipal
- Carlos Mario Palacios- Juayua FC
- Jefferson Palacios - Fuerte Aguilares
- Johalim Palacios - Atletico Marte
- Jefferson Palacios - Fuerte San Francisco
- Luis Palacios - Brujos de Izalco, Topiltzin, San Pablo Tacachico
- Yeferson Palacios - Santa Rosa Guachipilín
- Yohalin Palacios - Santa Rosa Guachipilín
- **Tardelis Pena** - Cruzeiro
- Boris Polo - Vendaval
- John Polo - Once Lobos, Arcense
- Jeison Quinones - San Pablo Tacachico
- Jimmy Quiñónez - San Luis F.C.
- José Marcos Quiñónez - El Vencedor
- Marcos Quinones - Batanecos
- Pedro Quiñonez - Once Municipal
- Keiner Rentería - Chaguite
- Roger Albeiro Rico - San Pablo Tacachico
- Camilo Rivas- Vendaval
- Luis Torres Rodríguez - La Asuncion
- Santiago Rodríguez - Once Municipal
- Carlos Salazar - Juayua FC
- Andres Salinas - Santa Rosa Guachipilín
- Jose Luis Sanabria - Cacahuatique
- Amaranto Sanchez - Chalatenango 33, Santa Rosa
- Ferdín Sánchez - Mar y Plata
- Luis Sanchez - Santa Rosa Guachipilín
- Wilson Sánchez - Santa Tecla F.C.
- Christian Camilo Santanna - Ilopaneco
- Juan Daniel Sinisterra - Titan
- Yuri Sinisterra - Fuerte San Francisco
- Efraín Solano - C.D. UDET
- Gabriel Suárez - Once Municipal
- Edier Tello - Ilopaneco
- **Yerson Tobar** - Fuerte San Francisco, Dragon
- Andrés Urrego - Fuerte San Francisco
- Carlos Urrego - Dragon
- Jhonathan Urrutia - Los Laureles
- Hector Valencia - Atletico Apopa
- Walter Valencia - Once Municipal, San Rafael Cedros, Real Destroyer, Fuerte San Francisco
- Andrés Vallecilla - Ciclon del Golfo, Fuerte San Francisco, Once Municipal, Chaguite, Aspirante, Liberal, Olímpico Litoral
- Jimmy Valoyes - Ciclon de Golfo
- **Marlon Viafara** - Sensunte Cabañas
- Jefferson Viveros - Brujos de Izalco, AD Destroyer, Aspirante

=== Paraguay ===
- Nelson Chaparro Agüero - Atletico Comalapa
- David Diosnel Álvarez - Chalatenango
- Pablo Caballero - Municipal Limeno
- Gabriel Garcete - Leones de Occidente, Once Lobos
- Javier Lezcano - Fuerte San Francisco

=== Peru ===
- Jair Camero - Vista Hermosa

=== Uruguay ===
- Claudio Pasadi - CD TACA
- Jonathan Piñeiro - Chaguite
- Juan Carlos Reyes - Juventud Independiente, Topiltzin, Sonsonate
- Leonardo Sum Rodríguez - Municipal Limeno
- Sergio Maximiliano Suárez - Isidro Metapan B
- Stivens Maciel - Fuerte San Francisco

== CONCACAF ==
=== Belize ===
- Cesario Rosales - Once Lobos

=== Costa Rica ===
- Luis Roberto Velásquez - Fuerte San Francisco
- Carlos Luis Rodríguez Marín - Jocoro

=== Dominican Republic ===
- Luis Sandy Lay (*) - Mar y Plata

=== Guatemala ===
- Cesar Cobar - Fuerte San Francisco
- Hristopher Robles - Turin FESA
- Gerson Tinoco - El Roble

=== Honduras ===
- Denis Alemán - Atlético Chaparratique
- Ángel Álvarez - Limeno
- Heráclito Amaya - Dragon
- Keller Andino — Once Municipal
- Ernesto Noel Aquino - Atletico Balboa
- Harry Bernárdez - Aspirante
- Erick Aziel Hernandez Berrios - Dragon
- Alfred Boden - Dragon
- Alfred Bodden - Atlético Chaparratique
- Jeiser Cacho - Aspirante, C.D. Topiltzin, Toros F.C., Limeno
- César Castro - Aspirante
- Benjamin Chamorro - Chaguite
- **Gregory Costly** - Jocoro, Liberal, Real Atletico Sonsonate
- Raúl Galindo - Chalatenango
- Gustavo Gómez Funes - Fuerte San Francisco
- Antonio Gómez - Limeno
- Fabián Hernández - Fuerte San Francisco
- Ericksen Marquina - La Asunción, Pasaquina
- David Ordoñez - La Asunción
- Andres Ortiz - Gerardo Barrios
- Osmar - Aspirante
- Pablo Róchez - Fuerte San Francisco, Inca Super Flat
- German Alexis Rodriguez - Topiltzín
- Nelson Sambulla - Independiente F.C.
- Hugo Sarmiento - Topiltzín, Fuerte San Francisco, Aspirante, El Roble, San Luis F.C.
- Eugenio Valerio - Atletico Balboa
- Franklin Vinosis Webster - Atletico Balboa, Ciclon de Golfo
- Brayan Zúniga - Jocoro, Dragon

=== Jamaica ===
- Mckauly Tulloch - Once Municipal
- Garrick Gordon - Dragon, Marte Soyapango, Brasilia, Real Destroyer

=== Mexico ===
- Arnulfo Canchola - Once Lobos

=== Panama ===
- Rolando Asprilla - Chalatenango, Acajutla FC
- Victor Barrera - Titan, Sonsonate, Audaz, Brujos de Izalco, Vendaval
- Charles Bustamante - Titan
- Armando Polo (*) - Tiburones de Sonsonate
- Ferdin Sánchez - Mar y Plata
- Raziel Scarlett - Titan

=== St. Kitts and Nevis (Saint Kitts and Nevis) ===
- Carlos Bertie (*) - Once Municipal

=== Trinidad and Tobago ===
- Akil Pompey — Once Municipal
