= 2024–25 Segunda División de El Salvador =

Segunda División de Fútbol Salvadoreño
- Season: 2024-25
- Champions: Apertura 2024: Zacatecoluca, Clausura 2025: Zacatecoluca
- Promoted: Zacatecoluca
- Relegated: Nil
- Matches: 56
- Goals: 129 (2.3 per match)
- Top goalscorer: Apertura 2024: Manuel Murillo (Cangrejera) (11 goals); Clausura 2025: Manuel Murillo (Los Laureles) (00 goals)
- Biggest home win: Apertura 2024: Titan 8–0 Cangrejera (8 September 2024); Clausura 2025: Espartano 7-2 Los Laureles (6 April 2025)
- Biggest away win: Apertura 2024: TBD 1-6 TBD (20 November 2024); Clausura 2025: TBD 2-6 TBD (1 May 2025)
- Highest scoring: Apertura 2024: Titan 8–0 Cangrejera (8 September 2024); Clausura 2025: Espartano 7-2 Los Laureles (6 April 2025)
- Longest winning run: Apertura 2024: 5 matches Titan; Clausura 2025: TBD 8–0 TBD (3 April 2025)
- Longest unbeaten run: Apertura 2024: 9 matches TBD; Clausura 2025: 7 matches
- Longest winless run: Apertura 2024: 16 matches TBD; Clausura 2025: 16 matches TBD
- Longest losing run: Apertura 2024: 10 matches TBD; Clausura 2025: 16 matches TBD
- Highest attendance: Apertura 2024: 3,465; TBD 3–0 TBD (1 August 2025)
- Lowest attendance: Apertura 2024: 189; TBD vs TBD (19 August 2025)
- Total attendance: Apertura 2024: TBD
- Average attendance: Apertura 2024: TBD
- Stats are from the regular season only.

The 2024–25 season, officially known as Liga de Plata, will be El Salvador's Segunda División de Fútbol Salvadoreño. The season will be split into two championships Apertura 2024 and Clausura 2025. The champions of the Apertura and Clausura play the direct promotion playoff every year. The winner of that series ascends to the Primera División de Fútbol de El Salvador.

== Changes to the 2024–25 seasons ==
Teams promoted to 2024–25 Primera División de El Salvador

- Cacahuatique

Teams relegated to Segunda División de Fútbol Salvadoreño - Apertura 2024

- Santa Tecla F.C.

Teams relegated to Tercera Division de Fútbol Salvadoreño - Apertura 2024

- Vendaval
- CD Pipil
- CD Topiltzín
- AD Chalatenango
- AD Inter San Salvador
- AD Municipal Juayúa

Teams promoted from Tercera Division de Fútbol Salvadoreño - Apertura 2024

- Zacatecoluca FC
- AD Brasilia
- AD Espartano
- CD Olímpico Litoral
- AD Batanecos
- Cangrejera FC

New teams or teams that purchased a spot in the Segunda division

- Jocoro FC

Teams that failed to register for the Apertura 2024 Segunda Division de Fútbol Salvadoreño

- Atlético Balboa
- EF San Pablo Tacachico
- C.D. Racing Jr
- Corinto F.C.
- CD Santiagueño
- Jocoro FC
- Santa Tecla FC

== Notable events ==
=== CD Titán purchase of Jocoro FC spot in the Primera Division ===
On 13 July 2024, CD Titán acquired the spot of Jocoro FC in the Primera division. This ended years of Jocoro FC being in the Primera division, which included finishing runners up twice.

=== Several teams selling their spot in the Segunda division ===
On June 18, Atletico Balboa announced that due to lack of financial support the club would be selling their spot in the Segunda Division.

On June 29, EF San Pablo Tacachico announced on the team's social media platform that due to several sponsors pulling support, high team cost and lack of fans' support, the club would be withdrawing from the Segunda Division.

On July 18, Rácing Jr announced, due to economic reasons, they would not be competing in the Segunda division.

On July 20, Brasilia announced on their social media account that due to being unable to settle financial debt from the previous season, they would no longer be able to meet the requirements and would not be participating in the Segunda division.

=== New guidelines for the Segunda division ===
On July 24, 2024, new guidelines were announced for inscription in the Segunda division. These included the main coach being required to have a coaching A License, and assistant coach being required to have a coaching B license. Segunda division requires coaching staff to include utility equipment, kinesiologist, medic and goalkeeping coach. Only one foreign player is allowed, only three players over age 32 are allowed to be signed, eight players must be under age 22, and only one foreign player may join.

=== Suspension of the first game of the season (Apertura 2024) ===
The first game of the season was programmed on August 24, 2024 between El Roble de Ilobasco and Zacatecoluca F.C.. However, it was announced that the game would be suspended, as El Roble de Ilobasco did not meet the league guidelines registering the five youth players and coaching staff who have coaching credentials. Later, El Roble Ilobasco were not registered for the season.

=== Three teams withdrawing from the Clausura 2025 ===
On January 11, 2025, C.D. Titan announced on the team's social media platform that due to several sponsors pulling support, high team cost and lack of fans' support, the club would be withdrawing from the Clausura 2025 season.

On January 16, 2025, Tiburones de Sonsonate announced via their social media pages that they would be withdrawing from the Clausura 2025 due to lack of financial and fans' support.

=== Clausura 2025 change of format ===
Due to three teams dropping out, FESFUT announced that Segunda division will be played in three rounds despite the complaints of the remaining clubs with expenses.

=== Notable deaths from Apertura 2024 season and 2025 Clausura season ===
The following people associated with the Primera Division died between the middle of 2024 and middle of 2025.

- Alexander Longa (ex Colombian Topiltzin player)
- Gerson Menjívar (ex Atletico Marte player)
- Óscar "Chino" Portillo (ex Liberal, ADI and Dragon player)
- Cesar Ivan Rodriguez (ex Marte Soyapango player)

== Managerial changes ==
=== Before the start of the season ===
Team	Outgoing manager	Manner of departure	Date of vacancy	Replaced by	Date of appointment	Position in table
Once Lobos	(El Salvador) Cesar Acevedo	Mutual agreement	June 2024	(El Salvador) Francisco Sibrián	June 2024	th (2024 Apertura)
Olímpico Litoral	(El Salvador) Kilmar Jiminez	Moved to be assistant coach	2024	(El Salvador) David Paz	2024	th (2024 Apertura)
Los Laureles	(El Salvador) Mario Elias Guevara	Contract finished	July 2024	(Uruguay) Ruben Alonso	July 2024	th (2024 Apertura)
Tiburones FC	(El Salvador) Juan Carlos Palma	Contract finished	July 2024	(El Salvador) Mario Elias Guevara	July 2024	th (2024 Apertura)
CD Cruzeiro	(El Salvador) Guillermo Rivera	Contract finished	July 2024	(El Salvador) Ivan Ruiz	July 2024	th (2024 Apertura)
AD Batanecos	(El Salvador) Ricardo Garcia	Sacked	June 2024	(El Salvador) Edgardo Flores	June 2024	th (2024 Apertura)
AD Brasilia	(El Salvador) Walter Casco	Moved to be assistant coach	July 2024	(El Salvador) Jorge Alberto Gonzalez	July 2024	th (2024 Apertura)
CD Titán	(El Salvador) Omar Mejia	Contract ended	July 2024	(Colombia) Guiodac Jamac	September 2024	th (2024 Apertura)

=== During the Apertura season ===
Team	Outgoing manager	Manner of departure	Date of vacancy	Replaced by	Date of appointment	Position in table
Los Laureles	(Uruguay) Ruben Alonso	Mutual consent, to go coach Fuerte San Francisco	October 18, 2024	(El Salvador) Ricardo López	October 2024	5th Centro Oriente (2024 Apertura)
Once Lobos	(El Salvador) Francisco Sibrian	Mutual consent	October 2024	(El Salvador) TBD	2024	5th Centro Oriente (2024 Apertura)
Tiburones de Sonsonate	(El Salvador) Mario Elias Guevara	Mutual consent	October 25, 2024	(El Salvador) Juan Ramon Paredes	October 27, 2024	5th Centro Oriente (2024 Apertura)

=== Between the Apertura and Clausura season ===
Team	Outgoing manager	Manner of departure	Date of vacancy	Replaced by	Date of appointment	Position in table
Zacatecoluca	(El Salvador) William Osorio	Contract finished	2024	(El Salvador) Guillermo Rivera	2024	Champion (2024 Apertura)
Fuerte Aguilares	(El Salvador) Alexis Guerra	Contract finished	December 2024	(El Salvador) Rafael Mariona	January 5, 2025	Runners up (2024 Apertura)
Olímpico Litoral	(El Salvador) David Paz	Sacked	December 2024	(El Salvador) Francisco Robles	January 2025	th (2023 Clausura)
Brasilia	(El Salvador) Jorge Armando Goznalez	Sacked	December 2024	(El Salvador) Alexi Guerra	January 2025	th (2023 Clausura)
Tiburones de Sonsonate	(El Salvador) Juan Ramon Paredes	Contract finished	December 2024	(El Salvador) None (as club withdrew from the Segunda Division)	January 2025	th (2023 Clausura)
Once Lobos	(El Salvador) TBD	Interimship finished	December 2024	(El Salvador) Juan Carlos Moscoso	January 2025	th (2023 Clausura)

=== During the Clausura season ===
Team	Outgoing manager	Manner of departure	Date of vacancy	Replaced by	Date of appointment	Position in table
Zacatecoluca	(El Salvador) Guillermo Rivera	Mutual consent	February 9, 2025	(El Salvador) Edgar Enrique (Interim)	February, 2025	TBD
Zacatecoluca	(El Salvador) Edgar Enrique	Interimship ended	February, 2025	(El Salvador) Edgar Henríquez	February, 2025	TBD
Olímpico Litoral	(El Salvador) Fransico Robles	Sacked	February 9, 2025	(Argentina) Ángel Piazzi	March, 2025	TBD
FC Los Laureles	(El Salvador) Ricardo Lopez	Sacked	March, 2025	(El Salvador) Lazaro Gutierrez	March 4, 2025	TBD

== Apertura 2024 ==
=== Current teams ===
Segunda Division El Salvador
Team	Location	Stadium	Capacity	Founded	Joined	Head coach	Foreign players
AD Batanecos	San Sebastián, San Vicente	Estadio José Francisco Molina	TBD	2023	2024	(El Salvador) Edgardo Flores	(Colombia) Marcos Quinones *
AD Brasilia	Suchitoto, Cuscatlán	Estadio Municipal José Castillo	TBD	1960	2024	(El Salvador) Jorge Armando Gonzalez	(Colombia) Freddy Gonzalez
Cangrejera FC	Puerto De La Libertad, La Libertad	Estadio Chilama	TBD	1970	2024	(El Salvador) Lázaro Gutierrez *	(Colombia) Manuel Murillo *
CD Cruzeiro	Candelaria Abajo, San Cayetano Istepeque, San Vicente	Estadio Municipal Candelaria Abajo	TBD	1986	2023	(El Salvador) Ivan Ruiz *	(Colombia) Victor Manuel Hinestroza
AD Espartano	San Julián, Sonsonate	Polideportivo Helene Arias	TBD	1934	2024	(El Salvador) Wilber Aguilar	(Colombia) Juan Diego Navarrete
CD Fuerte Aguilares	Aguilares, San Salvador	Complejo Deportivo Mario Jovel	TBD	1959	2023	(El Salvador) Alexis Guerra *	(Colombia) Hefferson Palacios
CD INCA	Entre Rios, La Libertad	Cancha Inca	TBD	1959	2023	(El Salvador) Alcides Salazar	(Colombia) Bryan Obregon
FC Los Laureles	Acajutla, Sonsonate	Cancha Tiburones Rojos	TBD	2016	2023	(Uruguay) Ruben Alonso	(Colombia) Jhonathan Urrutia
CD Once Lobos	Chalchuapa, Santa Ana	Estadio Once Lobos	TBD	1918	2021	(El Salvador) Francisco Sibrian	(Colombia) Stibin Cuesta
CD Olímpico Litoral	Loma Larga, La Unión	Complejo Deportivo Rafael López	TBD	1945	2024	(El Salvador) Kilmar Jimenez	(Colombia) Andres Vallecilla
Tiburones FC	Sonsonate, Sonsonate	Estadio Ana Mercedes Campos	TBD	2023	2023	(El Salvador) Mario Elias Guevara *	(Colombia) Cristian Caicedo *
CD Titán	Texistepeque, Santa Ana	Estadio Titán	TBD	1930	2019	(Colombia) Guiodac Jamac Muñoz	(Panama) Charles Bustamante
Zacatecoluca FC	Zacatecoluca, La Paz	Estadio Antonio Toledo Valle	TBD	2023	2024	(El Salvador) William Osorio	(Colombia) Devier Chaverra

=== Regular seasons ===
==== Centro Oriente ====
Pos	Team	Pld	W	D	L	GF	GA	GD	Pts	Qualification or relegation
1	Cruzeiro	10	5	3	2	12	10	+2	18	Advance to Playoffs
2	Fuerte Aguilares	10	5	2	3	12	8	+4	17	Advance to Playoffs
3	Zacatecoluca	10	5	1	4	8	8	0	16	Advance to Playoffs
4	Olímpico Litoral	10	4	2	4	6	6	0	14	Advance to Playoffs
5	Brasilia	10	3	1	6	14	16	−2	10	
6	Batanecos	10	3	1	6	9	13	−4	10	

Rules for classification: 1) points; 2) goal difference; 3) number of goals scored.

==== Centro Occidente ====
Pos	Team	Pld	W	D	L	GF	GA	GD	Pts	Qualification or relegation
1	Tiburones de Sonsonate	12	6	3	3	19	13	+6	21	Advance to Playoffs
2	Los Laureles	12	6	2	4	17	20	−3	20	Advance to Playoffs
3	Titan	12	5	4	3	28	12	+16	19	Advance to Playoffs
4	INCA	12	4	5	3	23	21	+2	17	Advance to Playoffs
5	Espartano	12	4	4	4	20	17	+3	16	
6	Cangrejera	12	5	1	6	24	33	−9	16	
7	Once Lobos	12	1	3	8	9	24	−15	6	

Rules for classification: 1) points; 2) goal difference; 3) number of goals scored.

== Finals ==
=== Conference quarter-finals ===
November 16, 2024

Olímpico Litoral	1-1	Tiburones de Sonsonate
Andrés Vallecilla		William López

Estadio Rafael Lopez Loma Larga, Loma Larga, La Union

November 24, 2024

Tiburones de Sonsonate	2-1	Olímpico Litoral
William Lopez; Alejandro Serrano		Jose Hernandez

Estadio Anna Mercedes Campos, Sonsonate, Sonsonate department

Tiburones de Sonsonate won 3–2 on aggregate.

November 20, 2024

Zacatecoluca	1-1	Los Laureles
Devier Chaverra 8'		Emerson Mancia

Estadio Antonio Toledo Valle, Zacatecoluca, La Paz Department

November 23, 2024

Los Laureles	0-1	Zacatecoluca
Nil		Edwin Pineda

Estadio Anna Mercedes Campos, Sonsonate, Sonsonate department

Zacatecoluca won 2–1 on aggregate.

November 20, 2024

Titan	1-1	Fuerte Aguilares
Mario Gutierrez		Yefferson Palacios

Estadio Texistepeque, Texistepeque, Santa Ana

November 24, 2024

Fuerte Aguilares	2-1	Titan
Juan Villeda; Jefferson Palacios		Bryan Ortega

Complejo Deportivo Mario Jovel, Aguilares

Fuerte Aguilares won 3–2 on aggregate.

November 17, 2024

AD Espartano	1-1	Cruzeiro
Rodolfo Huezo		Víctor Hinestroza

Estadio Helen Arias San Julian, San Julián, Sonsonate

November 24, 2024

Cruzeiro	4-1	AD Espartano
Kevin Ferrufino; Orsi Rodríguez; Anderson Ochoa; Santos Guzmán		Luis Merino

Estadio Candelaria Abajo, San Cayetano Istepeque, San Vicenete

Cruzeiro won 5–2 on aggregate.

=== Conference semi-finals ===
December 2, 2024

Fuerte Aguilares	0-0	Tiburones de Sonsonate
Nil		Nil

Complejo Deportivo Mario Jovel, Aguilares

December 7, 2024

Tiburones de Sonsonate	0-1	Fuerte Aguilares
Nil		Saul Cabrera

Estadio Ana Mercedes Campos, Sonsonate, Sonsonate Department

Fuerte Aguilares won 1–0 on aggregate.

December 2, 2024

Zacatecoluca	0-0	Cruzeiro
Nil		Nil

Estadio Antonio Toledo Valle, Zacatecoluca, La Paz

December 8, 2024
14:00 pm

Cruzeiro	1-2	Zacatecoluca
Daniel Aguirre	[]	Devier Chavarria; Oscar Molina

Estadio Candelaria Abajo, San Cayetano Istepeque, San Vicente

Zacatecoluca won 2–1 on aggregate.

=== Final ===
December 15, 2024
15:00 pm

Fuerte Aguilares	1-2	Zacatecoluca
Fernando Molina		Devier Chaverra

Complejo Deportivo Mario Jovel, Aguilares

December 21, 2024
14:00 pm

Zacatecoluca	2-1	Fuerte Aguilares
Oscar Molina 23'; Jefery Lopez 57'		Jefferson Palacios 16'

Estadio Antonio Toledo, Zacatecoluca, La Paz

Zacatecoluca won 4–2 on aggregate.

Apertura 2024 champions

1st title

== Clausura 2025 ==
=== Current teams ===
Segunda Division El Salvador
Team	Location	Stadium	Capacity	Founded	Joined	Head coach	Foreign Players
Batanecos	San Sebastián, San Vicente	Estadio TBD	TBD	2023	2024	(El Salvador) Edgardo Flores	(Colombia) Marcos Quinones *
Brasilia	Suchitoto, Cuscatlán Department	Cancha TBD	TBD	1960	2024	(El Salvador) Alexis Guerra	(Colombia) Freddy Gonzalez
Cruzeiro	Candelaria Abajo, San Cayetano Istepeque, San Vicente	Estadio Candelaria Abajo, San Vicente	TBD	1986	2023	(El Salvador) Ivan Ruiz *	(Colombia) Victor Manuel Hinestroza
Espartano	San Julián, Sonsonate Department	Estadio TBD	TBD	1934	2024	(El Salvador) Wilber Aguilar	(Colombia) Juan Diego Navarrete
Fuerte Aguilares	Aguilares, San Salvador	Complejo Municipal de Aguilares	TBD	1959	2023	(El Salvador) Rafael Mariona	(Colombia) TBD
INCA	Entre Rios, La Libertad	TBD	TBD	1959	2023	(El Salvador) Alcides Salazar	(Colombia) Bryan Obregon
Los Laureles	Acajutla, Sonsonate Department	Cancha Tiburones Rojos, Acajutla	TBD	2016	2023	(El Salvador) Ricardo López	(Colombia) Manuel Murillo *
Once Lobos	Chalchuapa, Santa Ana	Estadio Club Deportivo Once Lobos	TBD	1918	2021	(El Salvador) Juan Carlos Moscoso	(Colombia) Stibin Cuesta
Olímpico Litoral	Loma Larga, La Unión Department	Estadio	TBD	1945	2024	(El Salvador) Francisco Robles	(Colombia) Andres Vallecilla
Zacatecoluca	Zacatecoluca, La Paz	Estadio Antonio Toledo Valle	TBD	2023	2024	(El Salvador) Guillermo Rivera	(Colombia) Devier Chaverra

Cangrejera FC, Titan and Tiburones de Sonsonate withdrew from the competition.

=== Regular seasons ===
==== Grupo A ====
Pos	Team	Pld	W	D	L	GF	GA	GD	Pts	Qualification or relegation
1	Fuerte Aguilares	12	7	5	0	20	6	+14	26	Advance to Playoffs
2	INCA	12	5	3	4	20	16	+4	18	Advance to Playoffs
3	Once Lobos	12	4	5	3	9	10	−1	17	Advance to Playoffs
4	Espartano	12	4	1	7	23	26	−3	13	Advance to Playoffs
5	Los Laureles	12	2	2	8	15	29	−14	8	

Rules for classification: 1) points; 2) goal difference; 3) number of goals scored.

==== Grupo B ====
Pos	Team	Pld	W	D	L	GF	GA	GD	Pts	Qualification or relegation
1	Zacatecoluca	12	8	1	3	26	12	+14	25	Advance to Playoffs
2	Cruzeiro	12	6	3	3	20	14	+6	21	Advance to Playoffs
3	Brasilia	12	5	4	3	12	10	+2	19	Advance to Playoffs
4	Batanecos	12	3	3	6	7	19	−12	12	Advance to Playoffs
5	Olímpico Litoral	12	2	1	9	12	22	−10	7	

Rules for classification: 1) points; 2) goal difference; 3) number of goals scored.

== Finals ==
=== Conference quarter-finals ===
April 13, 2025

Batanecos	0-0	Fuerte Aguilares
Nil		Nil

Estadio, TBD, TBD

April 20, 2025

Fuerte Aguilares	1-0	Batanecos
Jorman Martinez		Nil

Estadio, TBD, TBD

Fuerte Aguilares won 1-0 on aggregate.

April 12, 2025

Brasilia	0-2	INCA
‘’Nil’’		Reinaldo Carpio; Joshua Sandoval

Estadio, TBD, TBD

April 17, 2025

INCA	5-1	Brasilia
Bryan Obregon 69' 83' 88'; Reynaldo Carpio 1'; Cristian Gil 45'		Alejandro Rodriguez 18'

Cancha San Isidro, Entre Rios, TBD

INCA won 7-1 on aggregate.

April 13, 2025

Once Lobos	2-2	Cruzeiro
Christian Leiva; Jefferson Alvarez		Bryan Ortega; Santos Guzman

Estadio Once Lobos, TBD, TBD

April 19, 2025

Cruzeiro	3-1	Once Lobos
Oscar Mejia; Milton Alfaro; Bryan Ortega		Tersio Benitez

Estadio, TBD, TBD

Cruzeiro won 5-3 on aggregate.

April 13, 2025

AD Esparatano	0-3	Zacatecoluca
Nil		Oscar Molina; Diego Ascensio; Gerson Figueroa

Estadio Helen Arias San Julian, TBD, TBD

April 19, 2025

Zacatecoluca	2-0	AD Esparatano
Devier Chaverra		Nil

Estadio Antonio Toledo Valle, Zacatecoluca, TBD

Zacatecoluca won 5-0 on aggregate.

=== Conference semi-finals ===
April 27, 2025
15:00

INCA	0-3	Zacatecoluca
Nil		Diego Ascencio 42'; Jonathan Canjura 58'; Melvin Alfaro

La Cancha Entre Rios de Loudres, Canton Entre Rios

May 3, 2025

Zacatecoluca	1-0	INCA
Melvin Alfaro		Nil

Estadio Antonio Toledo Valle, Zacatecoluca, La Paz

Zacatecoluca won 4-0 on aggregate.

April 27, 2025
15:00

Cruzeiro	0-1	Fuerte Aguilares
Nil		Manuel Otero

Estadio Candelaria Abajo, San Cayetano Istepeque, San Vicente

May 4, 2025
14:00 pm

Fuerte Aguilares	1-0	Cruzeiro
Bryan Erazo	[]	Nil

Complejo Deportivo Mario Jovel, Aguilares

Fuerte Aguilares won 2-0 on aggregate.

=== Final ===
May 11, 2025
15:00 pm

Fuerte Aguilares	0-0	Zacatecoluca
Nil		Nil

Complejo Deportivo Mario Jovel, Aguilares
Attendance: 655

May 17, 2025
14:00 pm

Zacatecoluca	1-0	Fuerte Aguilares
Oscar Moliba 180'		Nil

Estadio Antonio Toledo, Zacatecoluca, La Paz

Zacatecoluca won 1-0 on aggregate.

Clausura 2025 champions

2nd title
