= Ángel Orellana =

Salvadoran football manager (born 1975)

Personal information
- Full name: Ángel Eugenio Orellana
- Date of birth: 2 March 1975 (age 51)
- Place of birth: El Salvador

Team information
- Current team: Verdes FC (manager)

Managerial career
- Years: Team
- 1998–2002: Alianza (assistant)
- 2003: Mar y Plata
- 2006–2007: Municipal Juayúa
- 2007: Fuerte Aguilares
- 2008–2009: Once Lobos
- 2009: Atletico Balboa
- 2010: Vendaval
- 2011: Fuerte Aguilares
- 2011: Atlético Marte (caretaker)
- 2012: Diriangén (Nicaragua)
- 2012: Colón C-3 (Panamá)
- 2012: Real Madriz (Nicaragua)
- 2013: Real Destroyer
- 2013: Real Madriz(Nicaragua)
- 2013–2014: Deportivo Ocotal (Nicaragua)
- 2014: Chalatenango
- 2015: Quiriguá (Guatemala)
- 2015: La Asunción
- 2017–2018: San Rafael Cedros
- 2018: Barillas
- 2019: America Salcaja
- 2019-2020: Jalapa
- 2021: Atletico Sonsonate
- 2022: Rácing Jr
- 2022: Uspantán FC
- 2023: Verdes FC
- 2023: Fuerte Aguilares
- 2024–: Verdes FC

Ángel Eugenio Orellana Hernández (born 2 March 1975) is a Salvadoran professional football manager. He is currently the manager of Premier League of Belize club Verdes FC.

== Managerial career ==
Orellana was in charge of Diriangén FC in Nicaragua First Division. sub campeón clausura 2012

On 2 April 2023, Orellana was announced the new head coach of Verdes FC the first division of Belize Angel Orellana won his first international title by leading Verdes FC to 2023 Closing tournament, after defeating San Pedro Pirates 3-1 on aggregate.

== Manager statistics ==
Team	Nat	From	To	Record				
Team	Nat	From	To	G	W	D	L	Win %
Diriangen FC	(Nicaragua)							
Real Madriz	(Nicaragua)							
Ocotal	(Nicaragua)							
Colón C-3 F.C.	(Panama)	June 2012	August 2012	3	1	2	0	30
Quiriguá	(Guatemala)	December 2014	February 2015	7	2	3	1	
Barillas FC	(Guatemala)	January 2018						
ART Municipal Jalapa	(Nicaragua)							
America Salcaja	(Guatemala)	December 2018						
Uspantán FC	(Guatemala)	August 2022	March 2023					
Verdes FC	(Belize)	April 2023	Present					

== Honours ==
=== Manager ===
Diriangen FC

- Primera División de Nicaragua
  - Runner-up: 2012 Clausura

Verdes FC

- Premier League of Belize
  - Champion: 2023 Closing
