= Segunda División de El Salvador =

Salvadoran association football league

Liga de Plata Salvadoreña
- Founded: 1950; 76 years ago
- Folded: 2026; 0 years ago
- Country: El Salvador
- Confederation: CONCACAF
- Number of clubs: 14
- Level on pyramid: 2
- Promotion to: Primera División
- Relegation to: Tercera División
- Domestic cup: Copa El Salvador
- Last champions: INCA-Aruba (Last Champion) (2026 Clausura)
- Most championships: Once Lobos (5 titles)
- Broadcaster(s): Canal 10
- Website: Official website
- Current: 2025–26 Segunda División

The Segunda División de El Salvador (Second Division of El Salvador) is the second tier of football in El Salvador governed by the Federación Salvadoreña de Fútbol (FESFUT). Teams contest to promote to the Primera División.

The winning sides of the annual Apertura and Clausura contest each other, the winner directly promotes to Primera División.

The losing side of the match contest the last place team of Primera División to trigger promotion and relegation should the Primera División team lose to the Segunda División side.

== History ==
The Salvadoran Football Federation decided to improve the quality and competitiveness of football.

Segunda División, also called Liga B or Liga de Ascenso, was created in 1950 divided into two groups to contest within each group. The top sides of each group then contested in order that the winner is directly promotes to Primera División.

Category of Ascent was made of 12 teams, four teams in each zone: central, western and eastern.

The founding 12 teams in Segunda División were ANTEL, Atlético Marte, Marte Soyapango, Caterpillar de San Salvador, Picapiedra del Plan de la Laguna, Antiguo Cuscatlán, Dragón, Once Municipal, Molino F. C, Ahuachapán and Puertas de Santa Ana y San Rafael.

The inaugural President of the Segunda División was Dr Mauro Alfredo Bernal Silva.

The number of teams increased up to twelve teams per zone (36 teams altogether). In 1986 the Legislative Assembly emitted a decree in the Reforms to the Law of Football and the Category of Ascent that Segunda División would be limited to only 24 teams split into two groups.

In 2007, Segunda División adopted an Apertura and Clausura format.

On 7 May 2026, FESFUT decided to fold Segunda Division and Tercera Division and create a new a league called Liga de Ascenso.

== Members of the Segunda División (2025–26 season) ==
The league currently consists of the following 14 teams:

Location of teams in 2025–2026 Segunda División de El Salvador

== Centro Occidente Group A ==
Team	Location	Stadium	Capacity
ADET - Aruba FC	Jayaque, La Libertad	Cancha Hacienda El Tránsito	10,000
AD Espartano	San Julián, Sonsonate	Polideportivo Helen Arias	10,000
CD Fuerte Aguilares	Aguilares, San Salvador	Complejo Deportivo Mario Jovel	8,000
CD Inca	Entre Ríos, Lourdes, Colón, La Libertad	Cancha San Isidro	7,000
AD Juventud Independiente	San Juan Opico, La Libertad	Complejo Deportivo San Juan Opico	7,000
Sensunte Cabañas FC	Sensuntepeque, Cabañas	Polideportivo Sensuntepeque	5,000
CD Talleres Jr.	Tejutla, Chalatenango	Cancha José Pio Romero Bosque	2,000

== Group B Centro Oriental ==
Team	Location	Stadium	Capacity
CD Atlético Balboa	La Unión	Estadio Marcelino Imbers	4,000
AD Batanecos	San Sebastián, San Vicente	Estadio Juan Francisco Molina	5,000
CD Cruzeiro	San Cayetano Istepeque, San Vicente	Cancha Municipal Candelaria Abajo	5,000
CD Dragón	San Miguel	Estadio de Quelepa	5,000
CD Neo Pipil	San Juan Nonualco, La Paz	Estadio San Juan Nonualco	10,000
CD Olimpico Litoral	Loma Larga, La Unión	Complejo Deportivo Rafael López	8,000
CD Pipil	Cacaopera, Morazán	Estadio Vicente Paul Fuentes	5,000

== Division set-up ==
=== Changes in division set-up ===
- Number of clubs: currently 24. From TBD to TBD there were two divisions, each of 20 teams. From TBD to TBD it had 20. The 1991–92 season was played in two groups of 12 teams each; TBD again in one group with 24 teams, TBD with 20 teams.
- Teams promoted to the Primera División de Fútbol de El Salvador (La Primera): 3; 1981–1991 there was a promotion/relegation round, in 1991–92 there was 1 promotion per group.
- Number of relegations into the Regionalliga (until 1994: Oberliga): 4; 1991–92: 2–3 per group (inclusive relegation); 1992–93: 7.

=== Promotion and relegation ===
- From 2007 until 2010, the winner of the Apertura and Clausura would play for automatic promotion, where the loser of the match would play a playoff with the team that finished 9th in La Primera.

After this, and to the present, the winner of the Apertura and Clausura face in a final game with only the winner gaining promotion to La Primera.

- Until the 2015–16 season, the bottom three teams were relegated into the Tercera Division. Since the 2016–17, the bottom three teams of each group play in a round robin tournament; the bottom team of that round robin tournament are relegated to the Tercera Division.

== League matches derbies and classics in Segunda División ==
- Atletico Apopa vs Vendaval Apopa "Clásico de Apopa" (last played in )
- Independiente FC vs CD Platense "Clásico Paracentral" (last played in )

== Presidents of Segunda División de El Salvador Trophy & Copa ==
Name
(El Salvador) Carlos Burgos
(El Salvador) Carlos Torres
(El Salvador) Francisco Hirezi
(El Salvador) Cecilia Portillo
(El Salvador) Rafael Burgos
(El Salvador) Selvin Amaya
(El Salvador) Cesar Omar Garcia
(El Salvador) Francisco Velasquez
(El Salvador) Roberto Alvarenga
(El Salvador) Elmer Guidos
(El Salvador) David Hernandez
(El Salvador) Emerson Leon
(El Salvador) Elias Martinez
(El Salvador) Carlos Vanegas
(El Salvador) Hamilton Benítez
(El Salvador) Franklin Martínez
(El Salvador) Diego Mejia
(El Salvador) Anderes Rivas
(El Salvador) Argenis Alba
(El Salvador) Gilberto Baires
(El Salvador) Sandro Melgarejo
(El Salvador) Marvin Aranda
(El Salvador) Xavier Garcia
(El Salvador) Sebastian Ortiz
(El Salvador) Alexis Maravilla
(El Salvador) Edgar Valladares
(El Salvador) Steve Alfaro
(El Salvador) Luis Aguilar
(El Salvador) Vinico Muñoz
(El Salvador) Ismael Valladares
(El Salvador) Wilmer Novoa
(El Salvador) Carlos Arevalo
(El Salvador) Luis Fernando Espindola
(El Salvador) Rene Rosales
(El Salvador) Diego Sibrian
(El Salvador) Ezequiel Rivas
(El Salvador) Jimmy Najarro
(El Salvador) Henry Romero
(El Salvador) Dennis Garcia
(El Salvador) Adonay Martínez
(El Salvador) Joaquin Canales
(El Salvador) Jaime Rodriguez
(El Salvador) Carmen Vides
(El Salvador) Jose Chavez
(El Salvador) Blanca Crisol
(El Salvador) Julio César Cortés
(El Salvador) Ricardo Sol Meza
(El Salvador) Luis Ohrlich
(El Salvador) Oscar Antonio Rodriguez
(El Salvador) Andrès Hernandez
(El Salvador) Michael Mercado
(El Salvador) Fredis Benitez
(El Salvador) Mauricio Villalta
(El Salvador) Haron Marcheli
(El Salvador) Gerardo Sosa Ramos
(El Salvador) Américo Pérez Posadas
(El Salvador) Salvador de Leon
(El Salvador) Vincent Vasquez
(El Salvador) Marvin Bernal Silva (2003)
(El Salvador) Fredy Espinoza
(El Salvador) Kevin Melara
(El Salvador) Osvaldo Pinto (2011-2012)
(El Salvador) Alcides Ortez (2012-2013)
(El Salvador) Noel Benítez (2014-2015)
(El Salvador) Moisés Marín (2016-2017)
(El Salvador) Carlos Ramírez (2018-)
(El Salvador) Luis Campos
(El Salvador) Edwin García
(El Salvador) José Flores
(El Salvador) Miguel Granados
(El Salvador) Carlos Quiros
(El Salvador) Rafel Ángel Ramírez
(El Salvador) Gerson Rivas
(El Salvador) Bryan Membreño Perdomo
(El Salvador) Òsar Rodriguez
(El Salvador) Dalila Garces
(El Salvador) Paúl Magaña
(El Salvador) Luis Hernandez Alvarez
(El Salvador) Ricardo Sepúlveda
(El Salvador) Leyson Vargas
(El Salvador) Klimar Wilfrdo Echeverría
(El Salvador) Alfredo Salume
(El Salvador) Horacio Lugo
(El Salvador) Eduardo Arias Rank
(El Salvador) Luis Ernesto Tapia
(El Salvador) Misael Aifaro
(El Salvador) Emerson Hernandez
(El Salvador) Wilian Canales
(El Salvador) Leonardo Menjìvar
(El Salvador) Alexis Renderos
(El Salvador) Walter Montoya
(El Salvador) Manuel Acevedo
(El Salvador) Rene David Lopez
(El Salvador) Crisitan Zañas
(El Salvador) Karen Ferreira
(El Salvador) Jessica Lopez
(El Salvador) Jenifer Cruz
(El Salvador) Rosa Mèlida Morán
(El Salvador) Amilcar Guzmán
(El Salvador) Josè de La Paz Portillo
(El Salvador) Walter Moreno
(El Salvador) Herbert Ávila
(El Salvador) Deppie Gomez
(El Salvador) Luis Sosa
(El Salvador) Edwin Deras
(El Salvador) Cristian Zañas
(El Salvador) Loia Karina
(El Salvador) Maria Messing
(El Salvador) Lisa Baird
(El Salvador) Cheryl Bailey
(El Salvador) Jeff Plush
(El Salvador) Amanda Duff
(El Salvador) Jessica Berman
(El Salvador) Brayn Hernandez
(El Salvador) Walter Cardona
(El Salvador) Cristopher Ortiz
(El Salvador) Gabriel Galan
(El Salvador) Jacob Sensor
(El Salvador) Garado Contreras
(El Salvador) Kevin Martinez
(El Salvador) Luis Hernández
(El Salvador) Luis Granados
(El Salvador) Rene Duenas
(El Salvador) David Montejo
(El Salvador) Ramiro Guillermo
(El Salvador) Bryan Rios
(El Salvador) Noah Gutierrez
(El Salvador) Luis Moran
(El Salvador) K Giron
(El Salvador) H Escobar
(El Salvador) Rene Aguilar
(El Salvador) Ovidio Guzman
(El Salvador) E Sandoval
(El Salvador) R Castillo
(El Salvador) D Carcamo
(El Salvador) J Padraza
(El Salvador) David Funez
(El Salvador) Chambita Monje
(El Salvador) Emerson Avalon
(El Salvador) Steve Ralton
(El Salvador) Alejandro Benton
(El Salvador) William Reyes
(El Salvador) David Caneda
(El Salvador) Sophia Smith
(El Salvador) Jenna Nighswonger
(El Salvador) Jane Campball
(El Salvador) Naomi Girma
(El Salvador) Kerolin Nicoli lsrael Ferraz
(El Salvador) Juan Carlos Amoròs
(El Salvador) Carlos Amoròs
(El Salvador) Gillberto Baires
(El Salvador) Hamilton Benítez
(El Salvador) Alexis Maravilla
(El Salvador) Mango Costa
(El Salvador) Matheus Da Silva
(El Salvador) Meyson Ascencio
(El Salvador) Marlòn Cornejo
(El Salvador) Luis Aguilar
(El Salvador) Andrés Rivas
(El Salvador) Matheus Da Silva
(El Salvador) Argeins Alba
(El Salvador) Magno Costa Fernandes
(El Salvador) Diego Lemus
(El Salvador) Andres Rivas
(El Salvador) Meyson Ascencio
(El Salvador) Jose Rodriguez
(El Salvador) Serigo Torres
(El Salvador) Gerson Rodas
(El Salvador) Jesus Cruz
(El Salvador) Juan Jose Merino
(El Salvador) Hector Ferman
(El Salvador) Jami Chavez
(El Salvador) Noe Arévalo
(El Salvador) Alfonso Miranda
(El Salvador) Afrodicio Valladares
(El Salvador) Juan Quartrone
(El Salvador) Mauricio Alfredo
(El Salvador) Jorge Abrego
(El Salvador) Guillermo Rivas
(El Salvador) Gregorio Bundio
(El Salvador) Jose Cabrera Rajo
(El Salvador) Maurisio Palma
(El Salvador) y (United States) Juan Quarterone
(Brazil) Jorge Tupinambá

== League champions Segunda División de El Salvador ==
Season	Champions	Runners-up	Team(s) promoted	Champions coach
1950–51	H-13	Leones	H-13	
1951–52	Atlético San Alejo	Leones	Atlético San Alejo	
1952–53	H-13	Leones	H-13	
1953–54	Asturias Municipal	H-13	Asturias Municipal	
1954–55	Leones	Universidad Gerardo Barrios	Leones	
1955–56	Águila	Alianza FC	Águila, Alianza FC	
1956–57	Santa Anita	Once Municipal	Santa Anita	
1957–58	Quequeisque	L.A. Firpo	Quequeisque	
1958–59	Atlante	Leones	Atlante	
1959–60	Once Municipal	Quequeisque	Once Municipal	
1960–61	L.A. Firpo	Santa Anita	L.A. Firpo	
1961–62	Telecomunicaciones	L.A. Firpo	Telecomunicaciones	
1962–63	Universidad Gerardo Barrios	Once Municipal	Universidad Gerardo Barrios	
1963–64	ADLER	Gatos de Monterrey	ADLER	
1964–65	Quequeisque	Sonsonate	Quequeisque	
1965–66	L.A. Firpo	ADLER	L.A. Firpo	
1966–67	Sonsonate	Quequeisque	Sonsonate	
1967–68	L.A. Firpo	Atlante San Alejo	L.A. Firpo	
1968–69	CD Universidad Centroamericana	Sonsonate	CD Universidad Centroamericana	
1969–70	Atlético San Alejo	Atlante	Atlético San Alejo	
1970–71	Excelsior	Municipal Limeño	Excelsior	
1971–72	Once Municipal	L.A. Firpo	Once Municipal	
1972–73	Independiente	Platense	Independiente	
1973–74	Dragón	L.A. Firpo	Dragón	
1974–75	ANTEL	Sonsonate	ANTEL	
1975–76	Fuerte Aguilares	Dragón	Fuerte Aguilares	
1976–77	Once Lobos	Salvadoreño	Once Lobos	
1977–78	Dragón	Chalatenango	Dragón	
1978–79	Chalatenango	Municipal Limeno	Chalatenango	
1979–80	Once Lobos	ADLER	Once Lobos	
1980–81	Once Lobos	UES	Once Lobos	
1981–82	CD Universidad Centroamericana	Sonsonate	CD Universidad Centroamericana	
1982–83	Salvadoreño	Municipal Limeno	Salvadoreño	
1983–84	Metapan	CESSA	Metapan	
1984–85	Alba Acajutla	Dragon	Alba Acajutla	
1985–86	CD Metapán	Sonsonate	CD Metapán	
1986–87	ADET	Municipal Limeno	ADET	
1987–88	Cojutepeque	Dragon	Cojutepeque	
1988–89	Chalatenango	CD UCA	Chalatenango	
1989–90	Dragon	Municipal Limeno	Dragon	
1990–91	Metapan	Sonsonate	Metapan	
1991–92	Fuerte San Francisco	UES	Fuerte San Francisco	
1992–93	Municipal Limeno	Metapán FC	Municipal Limeno	
1993–94	El Roble	A.D.O.	El Roble	
1994–95	Apaneca	Metapán FC	CD Apaneca	
1995–96	Tiburones	Atlético Balboa	Tiburones	
1996–97	Once Lobos	Tiburones	Once Lobos	
1997–98	Marte Soyapango	Metapán FC	Marte Soyapango	
1999 Clausura	Atlético Balboa	Santiagueño	Atlético Balboa	
1999 Apertura	Tiburones	Metapán FC	Tiburones	
2000 Clausura	Juventud Olímpica Metalio	Atlético Balboa	Juventud Olímpica Metalio	
2000 Apertura	San Luis	Coca-Cola FC	San Luis	
2001 Clausura	Isidro Metapán	San Luis	Isidro Metapán	
2001 Apertura	Titan	Marte Soyapango	Titan	
2002 Clausura	Arcense	Atlético Chaparrastique	Arcense	
2002 Apertura	La Asunción	Atlético Marte	La Asunción	
2003 Clausura	Chalatenango	Dragon	Chalatenango	
2003 Apertura	Salvadoreño	Telecom FC San Salvador	Salvadoreño	
2004 Clausura	Once Municipal	Once Lobos	Once Lobos, Once Municipal	
2004 Apertura	Atlético Chaparratique	Arcense	Atlético Chaparratique	
2005 Clausura	Vista Hermosa	Coca-Cola FC	Vista Hermosa	
2005 Apertura	TACA	Municipal Limeno	TACA	
2006 Clausura	Independiente Nacional 1906	Municipal Limeno	Independiente Nacional 1906	
2006 Apertura	Nejapa	Juventud Independiente	Nejapa	
2007 Clausura	Nejapa	Atlético Balboa	Nejapa	
2007 Apertura	Atlético Balboa	Juventud Independiente	None	
2008 Clausura	Juventud Independiente	Atlético Balboa	Atlético Balboa and Juventud Independiente	
2008 Apertura	Atlético Marte	Municipal Limeno	None	
2009 Clausura	A.F.I.	C.D. Marte Soyapango	Atlético Marte and Municipal Limeno	
2009 Apertura	Once Municipal	ADI F.C.	None	(El Salvador) Nelson Mauricio Ancheta
2010 Clausura	UES	Fuerte Aguilares	UES and Once Municipal	(El Salvador) Miguel Diaz
2010 Apertura	Titan	Juventud Independiente	None	(El Salvador) Antonio García Prieto
2011 Clausura	Juventud Independiente	Once Lobos	Juventud Independiente	(El Salvador) Juan Ramón Sánchez
2011 Apertura	Titan	Marte Soyapango	None	(El Salvador) Antonio García Prieto
2012 Clausura	Santa Tecla	Brasilia	Santa Tecla	(El Salvador) Edgar Henríquez
2012 Apertura	Ciclon del Golfo	Turín FESA	None	(El Salvador) Nelson Mauricio Ancheta
2013 Clausura	Dragon	Ciclon del Golfo	Dragon	(El Salvador) Jose Mario Martínez
2013 Apertura	Pasaquina	Once Lobos	None	(El Salvador) David Ramírez
2014 Clausura	Once Lobos	Brasilia	Pasaquina	(El Salvador) Cesar Acevedo
2014 Apertura	Guadalupano	Marte Soyapango	None	(El Salvador) Omar Sevilla
2015 Clausura	Real Destroyer	El Roble	Real Destroyer	(El Salvador) Jorge Abrego
2015 Apertura	Municipal Limeño	Fuerte San Francisco	None	(El Salvador) Carlos Romero
2016 Clausura	Municipal Limeño	Atlético Comalapa	Municipal Limeño	(El Salvador) Carlos Romero
2016 Apertura	Independiente	Turin FESA	None	(Uruguay) Ruben Alonso
2017 Clausura	Audaz	Independiente	Audaz	(Honduras) German Perez
2017 Apertura	Jocoro	El Roble	None	(El Salvador) Carlos Romero
2018 Clausura	Jocoro	Brujos de Izalco	Jocoro	(Uruguay) Ruben Alonso
2018 Apertura	El Vencedor	Platense	None	(El Salvador) Giovanni Trigueros
2019 Clausura	CD San Pablo Municipal	Platense	El Vencedor	(El Salvador) Juan Ramón Sánchez
2019 Apertura	Platense	Racing Jr	None	(El Salvador) Jorge Abrego
2020 Clausura	C.D. Dragon	C.D. Platense	C.D. Dragon	
2020 Apertura	Platense	Real Destroyer	None	(El Salvador) Guillermo Rivera
2021 Clausura	Real Destroyer	Platense	Platense	(El Salvador) Juan Ramon Paredes
2021 Apertura	AD Municipal	Cacahuatique	None	(El Salvador) Ennio Mendoza
2022 Clausura	Dragon	Inter San Salvador	Dragon	(El Salvador) Marvin Benitez
2022 Apertura	Fuerte San Francisco	Real Destroyer	None	(Uruguay) Pablo Quinones
2023 Clausura	Titan	Atletico Balboa	Fuerte San Francisco	(El Salvador) Juan Ramón Sánchez
2023 Apertura	Titan	Cacahuatique	None	(El Salvador) Héctor Omar Mejía
2024 Clausura	Cacahuatique	Tiburones de Sonsonate	Cacahuatique	(Uruguay) Pablo Quiñones
2024 Apertura	Zacatecoluca F.C.	Fuerte Aguilares	None	(El Salvador) William Osorio
2025 Clausura	Zacatecoluca F.C.	Fuerte Aguilares	Zacatecoluca F.C.	(El Salvador) Edgar Henríquez
2025 Apertura	Balboa	Dragón	None	(El Salvador) Carlos Romero
2026 Clausura	INCA-Aruba	Sensunte Cabañas	INCA-Aruba	(El Salvador) Alcides Salazar

== See also ==
- Football in El Salvador – overview of football sport
