= C.D. Fuerte Aguilares =

Association football club in El Salvador

Fuerte Aguilares
- Full name: Club Deportivo Fuerte Aguilares
- Nicknames: Aguilares, "Los Cañeros"
- Founded: 1959; 67 years ago
- Ground: Complejo Deportivo Municipal de Aguilares; Aguilares, El Salvador
- Capacity: 5,000
- Chairman: (El Salvador) Gerardo Abarco
- Manager: (El Salvador) Alexis Guerra
- League: (El Salvador) Liga de Ascenso
- 2025 Clausura: Runner up
Home colours	Away colours

Club Deportivo Fuerte Aguilares, commonly known as Fuerte Aguilares are a Salvadoran professional football club based in Aguilares. The club currently plays in the Liga de Ascenso.

== History ==
They were relegated from Primera División de Fútbol Profesional after 1976/1977 season. They currently play in the Segunda División de Fútbol Salvadoreño after being promoted from the third tier in 2007. Fuerte Aguilares is one of the most successful football clubs in the country. For many years, the club competed at the highest level before being relegated to the second tier.

== Honours ==
=== Domestic honours ===
==== Leagues ====
- Primera División Salvadorean and predecessors
  - Champions : N/A
- Segunda División Salvadorean and predecessors
  - Champions (1) : 1976
  - Runners-up (2): 2024 Apertura, 2025 Clausura
- Tercera División Salvadorean and predecessors
  - Champions (2) : Apertura 2021
  - Play-off winner (2):

== Current squad ==
As of August 2026

Note: Flags indicate national team as defined under FIFA eligibility rules; some limited exceptions apply. Players may hold more than one non-FIFA nationality.

No.	Pos.	Nation	Player
2		ESA	Fabricio Alvarado
3		ESA	Jimmy Alvaradi
4		ESA	Diego Rivera (captain)
5		ESA	Leonardo Zamora
7		ECU	Gabriel Montaño
8		ESA	Elmer Melgar
9		ESA	Bryan Sibrian
11		ESA	Brayan Erazo
16		ESA	Miguel Mancias
17		ESA	Juan Pérez
18		ESA	Anderson Santamaría

No.	Pos.	Nation	Player
19		ESA	Fernando Alvarado
20		ESA	Eduardo Olmedo
21		ESA	Jefree Gonzalez
22		ESA	Fernando Torres
24		ESA	David Hernandez
25	GK	ESA	Odir Castaneda
27		ESA	Kevin Climaco
28		ESA	Anderson Murcia
29		ESA	Emerson Rodriguez

=== Players with dual citizenship ===
- (El Salvador) (United States) TBD

=== In ===
Note: Flags indicate national team as defined under FIFA eligibility rules; some limited exceptions apply. Players may hold more than one non-FIFA nationality.

No.	Pos.	Nation	Player
—		ESA	Fernando Torres (From Juventud Independiente)
—		ESA	Fernando Pineda (From Alianza)
—		ESA	Anderson Santamaría (From Batanecos)
—		ESA	Juan Pérez (From Talleres Jr)
—		ESA	Fabricio Alvarado (From Once Municipal)
—		ESA	Miguel Mancias (From Vendaval)

No.	Pos.	Nation	Player
—		ESA	Junior Serrano (From Zacatecoluca Reserva)
—		ESA	Leao Arteaga (From Talleres Jr)
—		ESA	Elmer Melgar (From Brasilia)
—		ESA	Jimmy Alvarado (From Brasilia)
—		ECU	Gabriel Montaño (From Minga FC)

=== Out ===
Note: Flags indicate national team as defined under FIFA eligibility rules; some limited exceptions apply. Players may hold more than one non-FIFA nationality.

No.	Pos.	Nation	Player
—	FW	COL	Bladimir Díaz (To TBD)
—		ESA	Moises Mejia (To UES)
—		ESA	Yonatan Pineda (To TBD)
—		ESA	Fernando Josue Martinez (To TBD)
—		ESA	Jeremy Argueta Gonzalez (To TBD)
—		ESA	Manuel Otero (To TBD)
—		ESA	Juan Villeda (To TBD)
—		ESA	Rene Ramirez (To TBD)
—		ESA	Eliezer Aguilar (To TBD)
—		ESA	Saul Cabrera (To TBD)

No.	Pos.	Nation	Player
—		ESA	Kevin Aguilar (To TBD)
—		ESA	Emanuel Vaquero (To TBD)
—		ESA	Julio Cerritos (To TBD)
—		ESA	Diego Alexis Gongora (To TBD)
—		ESA	Josue Ernesto Santos (To TBD)
—		ESA	Justin Ramos (To TBD)
—	GK	ESA	Hector Argumedo (To UES)

== Personnel ==
=== Management ===
Position	Staff
Owner	
President	(El Salvador) Ernesto Sibrian
Vice-President	(El Salvador) Gerardo Abarco
Team-Representative	(El Salvador)

=== Coaching staff ===
As of July 2026

Position	Staff
Coach	(El Salvador) Frank Hernández (*)
Assistant coach	(El Salvador) Juan Francisco Cuellar Hernandez (*)
Fitness coach	(El Salvador) Juan David Amaya (*)
Goalkeeper coach	(El Salvador) William Eduardo Abrego Góngora (*)
Club Doctor	(El Salvador) Cesar Chinchilla
Physiotherapist	(El Salvador) Jose Arquimidez
Utility	(El Salvador) Juan Tobar
Sports Director	(El Salvador) Cristian Velásquez Alas (*)

== List of notable players ==
Players that have played for Fuerte Aguilares in their career and played for a national team

- (El Salvador) Silvio Aquino (1987)
- (El Salvador) Marlon Menjívar (1984)

Players that have played for Fuerte Aguilares in their career and played in a World Cup:

- (El Salvador) Silvio Aquino (1987)

== List of coaches ==
- (Argentina) Gregorio Bundio (1976)
- (El Salvador) Carlos Mauricio Sotelo
- (El Salvador) Ángel Orellana (2007)
- (Uruguay) Rubén Alonso (August 2007 - 2007)
- (El Salvador) Ramón "El Sugar" Avilés (2008)
- (El Salvador) Víctor Girón Huezo (2009)
- (El Salvador) Juan Ramón Paredes (2009)
- (El Salvador) Luis Landos (2010)
- (Honduras) German Francisco Pérez (2010)
- (El Salvador) Juan Ramón "El Sugar" Avilés (2010–11)
- (El Salvador) Ángel Orellana (2011)
- (El Salvador) Geovani Portillo (2016)
- (El Salvador) Osmin Orellana (2019-2020)
- (El Salvador) Alexander Rodríguez (2021 - June 2022)
- (El Salvador) Rafael "lito" Mariona (June 2022 - 2022)
- (El Salvador) Ángel Orellana (June 2023 - December 2023)
- (El Salvador) Alexis Guerra (January 2024 - December 2024)
- (El Salvador) Rafael "lito" Mariona (January 2025 - December 2025)
- (El Salvador) Jorge Abrego (December 2025 -February 2026)
- (El Salvador) Edgar Henríquez (February 2026 - June 2026)
- (El Salvador) Frank Hernández (July 2026 -November 2026)
- (El Salvador) Juan Cuellar (November 2026 -Present)
