= Zacatecoluca FC =

Association football club in El Salvador

Zacatecoluca
- Full name: Zacatecoluca Fútbol Club
- Founded: 2023
- Ground: Estadio Anna Mercedes Campos
- Capacity: 10,000
- Chairman: (Colombia) Julian Acevedo
- Manager: (El Salvador) Lazaro Gutierrez
- League: Primera División de Fútbol Profesional
- 2026 Clausura: Overall: 12th (Relegated); Playoffs: Did not qualify
Home colours	Away colours

Zacatecoluca Fútbol Club is a Salvadoran professional football club based in Zacatecoluca, La Paz department, El Salvador.

The club will debut in the Primera División de Fútbol de El Salvador series since the Apertura 2025 tournament.

== History ==
Zacatecoluca FC won the Apertura 2023, Tercera Division de Fútbol Salvadoreño centro-oriente title defeating C.D. Audaz 2–0, thanks to goals from Ken Mejía and Eduardo Merino. Zacatecoluca FC followed by winning Clausura 2024 Tercera Division de Fútbol Salvadoreño centro-oriente title defeating Sensunte Cabañas on penalties.

The club continued their success in the second division, the first won the Apertura 2024 title defeating Fuerte Aguilares, and then won the Clausura 2025 title by again defeating Fuerte Aguilares 1-0 on aggregate. The club was promoted to the Primera Division for the first time in the club history.

On the 6th of December, 2025 the new owners of Zacatecoluca FC, Colombian Élite Field Holdings ownership, announced that the team will be moving to San Salvador, the club will play in the Estadio Cuscatlan. However due congestion of teams in San Salvador and low crowd numbers, the team moved to play in Sonsonate. The club never adjusted to the pace of Primera Division and despite star signings such as Gerson Mayen and Uruguayan Matias Mier. The club was officially relegated on the 25th of April, 2026 after a 4-2 loss against Alianza F.C..

The club ended up moving to Sonsonate and rebranding themselves as Nacional FC.

== Honours ==
=== Domestic honours ===
==== Leagues ====
- Segunda División Salvadorean and predecessors
  - Champions (2) : 2024 Apertura, 2025 Clausura
  - Runners-up (0): N/A
- Tercera División Salvadorean and predecessors
  - Champions (1) : Apertura 2023, Clausura 2024
  - Play-off winner (2): 2023–2024
- La Asociación Departamental de Fútbol Aficionado' and predecessors (4th tier)
  - Champions (1):
  - Play-off winner (0): N/A

== Sponsorship ==
Companies that Zacatecoluca FC currently has sponsorship deals with for 2025–2026 includes:

- (El Salvador) Galaxia – Official kit suppliers
- (El Salvador) El Sabor Casero – Official sponsors
- (Mexico) Electrolit – Official sponsors
- (El Salvador) Ury Store – Official sponsors
- (Colombia) Elite Field Holdings – Official sponsors

== Stadium ==
- Estadio Antonio Toledo Valle, Zacatecoluca, La Paz Department (El Salvador) (2009-2025)
- Estadio Cuscatlan (2026)
- Estadio Anna Mercedes Campos, Sonsonate (2026-Present)

Zacatecoluca will plays its home games at Estadio Anna Mercedes Campos in Sonsonate. They previously played at the Estadio Antonio Toledo Valle in Zacatecoluca, La Paz Department (El Salvador) and Estadio Cuscatlan in San Salvador.

== Rivalries ==
=== El Derbi Viroleño ===
The rivalry between Platense and Zacatecoluca is known as the "El Derbi Viroleño" due to the fact that both teams are based not only on the same department, La Paz Department, but also in the same city Zacatecoluca.

The intense feelings between the two sides began recently due to the close proximity and the switching of players between the clubs. The club "big brother, little brother" relationship between the clubs themselves, as Platense is a historic club while Zacatecoluca was only founded in 2023.

The team have started facing each once Zacatecoluca were promoted to the first division. The most recent match was 1-1 draw on the 28 September 2025. The teams have played 2 matches in all competitions, Platense winning 0, Zacatecoluca 1, and the remaining 1 having been drawn

== Records ==
=== Club records ===
- First Match (Primera División): 0-1 vs. Cacahuatique, July 20, 2025
- First Match (official): vs. TBD, year
- Most points in La Primera: 00 points (00 win, 00 draws, 0 losses) Year/Year
- Least points in La Primera: 00 points (0 win, 0 draws, 00 losses) Year/year
- Biggest victory in the Primera division: 3-1 vs. Platense,
- Biggest loss in the Primera Division: 1-6 vs. FAS, April 5, 2026

=== Individual records ===
- Most games for Zacatecoluca, (Primera División): 31, Manuel Zaldana
- Most goals in a season, (Primera División): 9, Matias Mier

== Current squad ==
Note: Flags indicate national team as defined under FIFA eligibility rules; some limited exceptions apply. Players may hold more than one non-FIFA nationality.

No.	Pos.	Nation	Player
1	GK	PAR	Sandro Melgarejo
3	DF	SLV	Mauricio Cuellar
4	DF	SLV	Nestor Somoza
5	MF	SLV	Vinicio Munoz
6	MF	SLV	Jose Zaldana
7	FW	SLV	Eduardo Merino (vice-Captain)
8	MF	SLV	Jeffrey López
9	FW	SLV	Zander Tidwell
11	FW	SLV	Edson Escobar
12	MF	SLV	Carlos Pena
14	FW	SLV	Diego Ascencio
15	MF	SLV	Kilmar Echevarria

No.	Pos.	Nation	Player
17	FW	COL	Danny Zúñiga
19	FW	SLV	Oscar Molina
20	MF	SLV	Jonathan Perez
21	DF	SLV	Marlon Trejo
22	GK	SLV	Marcelo Urquilla
23	MF	USA	Josue Dubon
24	MF	SLV	Melvin Alfaro
25	GK	COL	Oscar Castellanos
26	MF	COL	Jeyson Velasco
31	FW	SLV	Wilber Diaz
36	MF	SLV	Andy Rodríguez

=== In ===
Note: Flags indicate national team as defined under FIFA eligibility rules; some limited exceptions apply. Players may hold more than one non-FIFA nationality.

No.	Pos.	Nation	Player
—	GK	COL	Oscar Castellanos (From Atlético Bucaramanga)
—	MF	URU	Matías Mier (From River Plate Montevideo)
—		SLV	Diego Ascencio (From Inter FA)
—		SLV	Nestor Somoza (From Hércules)
—		SLV	Wilber Diaz (From Isidro Metapan)

No.	Pos.	Nation	Player
—		COL	Danny Zúñiga (From TBD)
—		SLV	(From TBD)
—		SLV	(From TBD)

=== Out ===
Note: Flags indicate national team as defined under FIFA eligibility rules; some limited exceptions apply. Players may hold more than one non-FIFA nationality.

No.	Pos.	Nation	Player
—		URU	Matías Mier (To Alianza)
—		SLV	Willian Flores (To Alianza)
—		SLV	Jose Zaldana (To Isidro Metapan)
—		SLV	Oscar Molina (To Fuerte San Francisco)
—		SLV	(To TBD)
—		SLV	(To TBD)

No.	Pos.	Nation	Player
—		SLV	(To TBD)
—		SLV	(To TBD)
—		SLV	(To TBD)
—		SLV	(To TBD)

== Coaching staff ==
As of April, 2026

Position	Staff
Manager	(El Salvador) Lazaro Gutierrez
Assistant Manager	(El Salvador) Angel Orellana
Reserve Manager	(El Salvador) Aristides Mejia
Ladies's Manager	(El Salvador) Carlos Gotran
Physical coach	(El Salvador) Rudi Cedillos
Assistant Physical coach	(El Salvador) TBD
Goalkeeper Coach	(El Salvador) Jorge Gonzalez
Kineslogic	(El Salvador) TBD
Utility Equipment	(El Salvador) Boheimo Barillas
Football director	(El Salvador) Erick Alfaro
Team Doctor	(El Salvador) TBD

== List of coaches ==
The club's current manager is Salvadoran Lazaro Gutierrez. There have been 9 permanent and 2 caretaker managers of Zacatecoluca since the appointment of the club's first professional manager, Miguel Soriano in 2023. The club's longest-serving manager, in terms of both length of tenure and number of games overseen, is Miguel Soriano, who managed the club between 2023 and 2024. Colombian-Spaniard Juan Pablo Buch was Zacatecoluca's first manager from outside the El Salvador. Salvadorian William Osorio is the club's most successful coach, having won one Segunda division title and Tercera division title, this is followed by Edgar Henríquez who also won one Segunda division title, and Miguel Soriano won one Tercera division title.

- (El Salvador) Miguel Soriano (June 2023 – March 2024)
- (El Salvador) William Osorio (March 2024 – December 2024)
- (El Salvador) Guillermo Rivera (January 2025 – February 2025)
- (El Salvador) Edgar Enrique (February 2025)
- (El Salvador) Edgar Henríquez (February 2025– May 2025)
- (El Salvador) Nelson Ancheta (June 2025– October 2025)
- (El Salvador) Ivan Ruiz (October 2025 - December 2025)
- (El Salvador) Chepe Martínez (December 2025 – January 2026)
- (El Salvador) Lazaro Gutierrez (February 2026 – February 2026)
- (Colombia) (Spain) Juan Pablo Buch (February 2026 – April 2026)
- (El Salvador) Ivan Ruiz Interim (April 2026)
- (El Salvador) Lazaro Gutierrez (April 2026 – Present)

== Non-playing staff ==
=== Management ===
As of May, 2026

Position	Name
Owner	(Colombia) Elite Field Holding
President	(Colombia) Julián Acevedo
Vice-president	(Colombia) Santiago Ortiz
Gerente Deportivo	(El Salvador) Vacant
Administrative Director	(El Salvador) Vacant
Deputy managing director	(El Salvador) Vacant
Treasurer	(El Salvador) Rosy Gonzalez
Executive Director	(El Salvador) Santos Merino
Sporting director	(El Salvador) Vacant

=== List of President ===
- (El Salvador) Alfredo Deras (2023 - December 2025)
- (Colombia) Julián Acevedo (January 2026 - Present)

== Notable Players ==
- (El Salvador) Gerson Mayen

=== Team captains ===
Name	Years
(El Salvador) Eduardo Merino	2024-2025
(El Salvador) Gerson Mayen	2025
(Uruguay) Matías Mier	2026

== Other departments ==
=== Football ===
==== Reserve team ====
The reserve team serves mainly as the final stepping stone for promising young players under the age of 21 before being promoted to the main team. The second team is coached by Aristides Mena. the team played in the Primera División Reserves, their greatest successes were finishing runner up in the Reserve championships in the Clausura 2024. It plays its home matches at Estadio Antonio Toledo Valle, adjacent to the first teams and women's team.

Name	Nat	Tenure	Notes
Aristides Mena	(El Salvador)	June 2025	N/A
Eduardo Lara Moscote	(El Salvador)	June 2025 - Present	N/A

=== Current squad ===
As of: June, 2025 Note: Flags indicate national team as defined under FIFA eligibility rules; some limited exceptions apply. Players may hold more than one non-FIFA nationality.

No.	Pos.	Nation	Player
—		SLV	TBD
—		SLV	TBD
—		SLV	TBD
—		SLV	TBD
—		SLV	TBD

No.	Pos.	Nation	Player
—		SLV	TBD
—		SLV	TBD
—		SLV	TBD
—		SLV	TBD
—		SLV	TBD

==== Junior teams ====
The youth team (under 17 and under 15) has produced some of El Salvador's top football players, including TBD and TBD. It plays its home matches at TBD, adjacent to the first team's ground, and it is coached by Carlos Padilla (under 17) and Juan (Under 15). The team greatest successes was winning Clausura 2025 season.

Name	Nat	Tenure
TBD	(El Salvador)	N/A
Carlos Padilla	(El Salvador)	2025 - July 2025
Eduardo Lara Moscote	(El Salvador)	July 2025 - Present

=== Current squad ===
As of: June, 2025 Note: Flags indicate national team as defined under FIFA eligibility rules; some limited exceptions apply. Players may hold more than one non-FIFA nationality.

No.	Pos.	Nation	Player
—		SLV	TBD
—		SLV	TBD
—		SLV	TBD
—		SLV	TBD
—		SLV	TBD

No.	Pos.	Nation	Player
—		SLV	TBD
—		SLV	TBD
—		SLV	TBD
—		SLV	TBD
—		SLV	TBD

==== Women's team ====
The women's first team, which is led by head coach Carlos Gotran, features several members of the El Salvador national ladies team. Their greatest successes were reaching the Quarter finals of Apertura 2025, where they lost 10–1 on aggregate to Limeno Women's.

Name	Nat	Tenure
Carlos Gotran	(El Salvador)	June 2025 - July 2025
Ivan Ruiz	(El Salvador)	July 2025 - Present

=== Current squad ===
As of: June, 2025 Note: Flags indicate national team as defined under FIFA eligibility rules; some limited exceptions apply. Players may hold more than one non-FIFA nationality.

No.	Pos.	Nation	Player
1		SLV	Maybelin Aguilar
5		SLV	Alisson Rivas
7		SLV	Estefany Pena
8		SLV	Jenifer Carrillo
9		SLV	Yaritza Duran
12		SLV	Yoxini Cabrera
14		SLV	Gabriela Mejia
15		SLV	Gloria Cubias
17		SLV	Zuila Caceres
20		SLV	Melody Ramirez
21		SLV	Reina Lopez
22		SLV	Maria Perez
23		SLV	Melissa Mendez
26		SLV	Katherine Mejia
27		SLV	Ingrid Roman
30		SLV	Sandra Tamacas (Captain)
—		SLV	Katerin Quinteros
—		SLV	Suleyma Mangadi

No.	Pos.	Nation	Player
—		SLV	Alejandra Aguilero
—		SLV	Katherin Duran
—		SLV	Rika Rivas
—		SLV	Leslie Velasquez
—		SLV	Keiri Ramos
—		SLV	Maria Ramos
—		SLV	Dayana Pineda
—		SLV	Ixora Angel

=== In ===
Note: Flags indicate national team as defined under FIFA eligibility rules; some limited exceptions apply. Players may hold more than one non-FIFA nationality.

No.	Pos.	Nation	Player
—		SLV	TBD (From TBD)
—		SLV	TBD (From TBD)
—		SLV	TBD (From TBD)
—		SLV	TBD (From TBD)
—		SLV	TBD (From TBD)

No.	Pos.	Nation	Player
—		SLV	TBD (From TBD)
—		SLV	TBD (From TBD)
—		SLV	TBD (From TBD)
—		SLV	TBD (From TBD)
—		SLV	TBD (From TBD)

=== Out ===
Note: Flags indicate national team as defined under FIFA eligibility rules; some limited exceptions apply. Players may hold more than one non-FIFA nationality.

No.	Pos.	Nation	Player
—		SLV	TBD (To TBD)
—		SLV	TBD (To TBD)
—		SLV	TBD (To TBD)

No.	Pos.	Nation	Player
—		SLV	TBD (To TBD)
—		SLV	TBD (To TBD)
—		SLV	TBD (To TBD)
