= Apaneca F.C. =

Association football club in El Salvador

- Full name: Apaneca Futbol Clube
- Founded: 1934 (as Texizal Fútbol Club); 1985 (renamed as Apaneca)
- Manager: TBD
- League: ADFAS
- TBD: TBD
Home colours

Apaneca Futbol Clube are a Salvadoran professional football club based in Apaneca, El Salvador.

The club currently plays in the ADFAS.

== Honours ==
=== Domestic honours ===
- Segunda División Salvadorean and predecessors
- Champions (1) : 1992
  - Promotion champion up (2): 1992
- Tercera División Salvadorean and predecessors
  - Champions:(1) : 1987
- ADFAS and predecessors
  - Champions - Ahuachapan Department (1) : 1985

== Coaches ==
- (El Salvador) Cesar Acevedo
- (Argentina) Raúl Cocherari

== Notable players ==
- (El Salvador) Enio Mendoza (1989–1993)
- (El Salvador) Juan Carlos López Padilla (1993)
- (Uruguay) Raúl Esnal (1993)
- (Uruguay) Ruben Alonso
- (Brazil) Francisco Salvador Filho

== Externals Links ==
- https://historico.elsalvador.com/historico/734229/el-futbol-salvadoreno-esta-de-luto-murio-federico-martinez.html
