= Armando Polo =

Panamanian footballer (born 1990)

Personal information
- Full name: Armando Enrique Polo Aguilar
- Date of birth: 2 April 1990 (age 36)
- Place of birth: Panama City, Panama
- Height: 1.67 m (5 ft 6 in)
- Position: Forward

Team information
- Current team: Los Laureles
- Number: 29

Youth career
- Chepo FC

Senior career*
Years	Team	Apps	(Gls)
2008	Chepo	1	(0)
2009–2011	→ Sporting SM (loan)	45	(21)
2012	La Equidad	1	(0)
2012	San Francisco	15	(5)
2013	Río Abajo	13	(5)
2013	Pérez Zeledón	19	(7)
2014	Río Abajo	19	(1)
2014	Árabe Unido	11	(4)
2015	Coatepeque	16	(1)
2015–2016	Árabe Unido	33	(15)
2016	Monagas	8	(1)
2016–2017	Tauro	20	(8)
2017	Sonsonate	16	(15)
2018	Unión Comercio	6	(0)
2018	Tauro	7	(3)
2019	Sonsonate	21	(13)
2019	Santa Tecla	23	(16)
2020	Plaza Amador	5	(2)
2020–2021	Luis Ángel Firpo	11	(2)
2021	Independiente	9	(2)
2021	Árabe Unido	11	(1)
2023–	Los Laureles		

International career
2006–2007	Panama U-17	10	(4)
2008	Panama U-20	9	(4)
2010	Panama U-21	1	(0)
2010–	Panama	4	(0)
- * Club domestic league appearances and goals as of 12:35, 31 January 2021 (UTC)

Armando Enrique Polo Aguilar (born 2 April 1990) is a Panamanian professional football forward who plays for Los Laureles in El Salvador.

== Club career ==
A diminutive winger or forward, he started his career at local club Chepo and then had a spell at Sporting San Miguelito. In January 2012, he moved abroad to join Colombian side La Equidad but in July 2012, Polo returned to Panama to play for San Francisco. He then moved on to Río Abajo in January 2013 and had a second spell abroad at Costa Rican team Pérez Zeledón before returning to Río Abajo in January 2014 for another season. In August 2014, he was announced as a new signing at Árabe Unido.

In January 2015 he was presented at Guatemalan outfit Coatepeque where he joined compatriot José Calderón, but Polo left them in April 2015 after he claimed the club failed to pay him his salary and he subsequently returned to Árabe Unido.

=== Sonsonate FC ===
After winning the tournament with Tauro, Polo signed with Sonsonate FC of the Salvadoran Primera División.

=== Return to Sonsonate FC ===
In December 2018, Polo re-signed with Sonsonate FC for the Clausura 2019.

== International career ==
Polo made his debut for Panama in a March 2010 friendly match against Venezuela and has, as of 29 July 2015, earned a total of 4 caps, scoring no goals.

== Honours ==
=== Individual ===
- Liga Panameña de Fútbol Top Scorer (1):
  - 2009 (A) II
