= Jorge Búcaro =

Salvadoran footballer and manager (1946–2023)

Personal information
- Full name: Jorge Adalberto Búcaro
- Date of birth: 5 May 1946
- Place of birth: San Miguel, El Salvador
- Date of death: 26 October 2023 (aged 77)
- Place of death: Huehuetenango, Guatemala
- Position: Midfielder

Senior career*
| Years | Team | Apps | (Gls) |
| 1966–1971 | Águila | | |
| 1972 | Alianza | | |
| 1973–1975 | Platense | | |
| 1976 | FAS | | |

International career
| | El Salvador | 6 | (0) |

Managerial career
- 1997: Arcense
- 2005–2006: Salvadoreño (Armenia)
- 2007–2008: El Roble
- 2010: Santa Tecla
- 2014: Racing Jr
- * Club domestic league appearances and goals

Jorge Adalberto Búcaro (5 May 1946 – 26 October 2023) was a Salvadoran football player and manager.

== Club career ==
El Gancho (the Hook) Búcaro started his career in 1966 with Águila and won the 1968 league title with them. In 1971, he joined Alianza followed by a move to Platense with whom he won another league title in 1975. He retired when playing with FAS in 1976.

== International career ==
Búcaro also played for El Salvador and has represented his country in two FIFA World Cup qualification matches in 1968. He also was a squad member of the Selección when they played Honduras in 1969 which sparked the infamous Football War, but he did not make the squad for the 1970 FIFA World Cup.

== Managerial career ==
After retiring, Búcaro managed a crop of lower-division sides like Salvadoreño (Armenia), Arcense and El Roble before taking charge of Second Division Santa Tecla.

== Death ==
Jorge Búcaro died on 26 October 2023, at the age of 77.
