= Héctor Lemus =

Colombian footballer (born 1991)

Personal information
- Full name: Héctor Luis Lemus Mena
- Date of birth: 12 October 1991 (age 35)
- Place of birth: Colombia
- Height: 1.89 m (6 ft 2 in)
- Position: Forward

Senior career*
Years	Team	Apps	(Gls)
2012–2013	Universitario Popayán		
2014–2015	Aspirante		
2015–2016	Dragón	16	(3)
2016–2017	Independiente FC		
- * Club domestic league appearances and goals

Héctor Luis Lemus Mena (born 12 October 1991) is a Colombian professional footballer.

== Club career ==
=== Dragón ===
Lemus signed with Dragón of the Salvadoran Primera División for the Apertura 2015.

=== Independiente FC ===
Lemus signed with Independiente FC of Segunda División for the Apertura 2016. In February 2018, Lemus was successfully operated on for an injury to his left knee. This injury occurred when he played with Dragón, but the club of San Miguel did not respect his contract and did not take care of the medical expenses.
