= Cangrejera F.C. =

Salvadoran professional football club

- Full name: Cangrejera Futbol Club
- Founded: 1970
- Ground: Estadio Chilama Puerto De La Libertad; La Libertad, La Libertad Department, El Salvador
- Chairman: (El Salvador) Mauricio Alas Segundo Representante Alexander Escobar
- Manager: (El Salvador) Lázaro Gutierrez
- League: Segunda División de Fútbol De El Salvador
- Clausura 2012: Grupo Occidente
| Home colours | Away colours |

Cangrejera Futbol Clube is a Salvadoran professional football club based in La Libertad, La Libertad Department, El Salvador.

The club currently plays in the Tercera Division de Fútbol Salvadoreño.

== Honours ==
=== Domestic honours ===
==== Leagues ====
- Tercera División Salvadorean and predecessors
  - Champions (2) : N/A
  - Play-off winner (2):
- La Asociación Departamental de Fútbol Aficionado' and predecessors (4th tier)
  - Champions (1):
  - Play-off winner (2):

== Current squad ==
Note: Flags indicate national team as defined under FIFA eligibility rules; some limited exceptions apply. Players may hold more than one non-FIFA nationality.

| No. | Pos. | Nation | Player |
|---|---|---|---|
| — | | SLV | TBD |
| 2 | | SLV | Samuel Miranda |
| 4 | | SLV | Harrison Cornejo |
| 5 | | SLV | Irvin Carida |
| 9 | | SLV | Isa Aguiular |
| 10 | | SLV | Levin Rojas |
| 11 | | SLV | Daniel Torres |
| 13 | | SLV | Sebastian Romero |
| 14 | | SLV | Josue Fuentes |

| No. | Pos. | Nation | Player |
|---|---|---|---|
| 17 | | SLV | Sergio Castillo |
| 22 | | SLV | Alejandro Mendez |
| 23 | | SLV | Bryan Alas |
| 27 | | SLV | Kevin Mejia |
| 29 | | COL | Manuel Murillo |
| 31 | | SLV | Ymer Menjivar |
| 33 | | SLV | Sergio Franco |
| 36 | | SLV | Ery Quinteros |

=== In ===
Note: Flags indicate national team as defined under FIFA eligibility rules; some limited exceptions apply. Players may hold more than one non-FIFA nationality.

| No. | Pos. | Nation | Player |
|---|---|---|---|
| — | FW | COL | Manuel Murillo (From Once Deportivo) |
| — | FW | SLV | Levin Rojas (From Tiburones de Sonsonate) |
| — | | SLV | Isai Aguilar (From Titan) |
| — | | SLV | Bryan Alas (From INCA) |
| — | | SLV | Dani Torres (From Corinto F.C.) |

| No. | Pos. | Nation | Player |
|---|---|---|---|
| — | | SLV | TBD (From Free agent) |
| — | | SLV | TBD (From Free agent) |

== Coaching staff ==
As of August 2024

| Position | Staff |
|---|---|
| Manager | (El Salvador) Lázaro Gutiérrez |
| Assistant Manager | (El Salvador) TBD |
| Physical coach | (El Salvador) Saúl Monterroza |
| Goalkeeper Coach | (El Salvador) TBD |
| Kineslogist | (El Salvador) TBD |
| Utility Equipment | (El Salvador) TBD |
| Utility Equipment | (El Salvador) TBD |
| Football director | (El Salvador) Jorge Molina |
| Team Doctor | (El Salvador) TBD |

== Records ==
- Record League victory: vs TBD, 2024
- Record League defeat: 0-8 v Titan, 8 September 2024
- Largest Home victory, Primera División: 5-1 v TBD, Day Month Year
- Largest Away victory, Primera División: 3-0 v TBD, Day Month Year
- Largest Home loss, Primera División: 1–3 v TBD, Day Month Year
- Largest Away loss, Primera División: 0-8 v Titan, 8 September 2024
- Highest average attendance, season: 49,176, Primera División
- Most goals scored, season, Primera División: 25, TBD
- Worst season: Segunda Division 2002-2003: 1 win, 4 draws and 17 losses (7 points)
- Record Cup Victory5-1 v TBD, Day Month Year
- Record Cup Defeat: 1–3 v TBD, Day Month Year
- Most successive victories TBD matches (from 26 December 1999 to 7 March 2000)
- Most games without a win TBD matches (from 18 October 2008 to 13 January 2009)
- Most successive defeats TBD matches (from 11 April 1990 to 15 September 1990)
- Most successive draws TBD matches (from 13 December 1992 to 16 January 1993)
- Longest unbeaten TBD matches (from 4 October 1980 to 20 December 1980)
- Record home attendance 3,000 vs TBD, League Seasom, Day Month Year
- Record lowest home attendance 340 vs TBD, Day Month Year
- Record league attendance 68,160 vs TBD, Day Month Year

=== Individual records ===
- Record appearances (all competitions):
- Record appearances (Primera Division):
- Most goals in a season (all competitions): TBD (168)
- Most hat-tricks (all competitions):
- Most international caps player for Sal Y Mar: 00 (0 whilst at Sal Y Mar), TBD
- Most international caps for El Salvador while a Sal Y Mar player:
- Most goals scored by one player: 7, TBD vs TBD, 2024
- Oldest player: TBD (36 years and 239 days)
- Youngest player: TBD (15 years and 00 days) [1]
- Oldest scorer: Nicolas Munoz (36 years and 239 days)
- Youngest scorer: TBD (16 years and 310 days)
- Quickest scorer: TBD (9 seconds)
- Quickest sending off: TBD (3 minutes)

== List of coaches ==
- (El Salvador) Miguel Soriano (- February 2020)
- (El Salvador) Lázaro Gutiérrez (July 2020-January 2021)
- (El Salvador) Miguel Soriano (January 2021 - December 2021)
- (El Salvador) Jorge Francisco Molina (February 2022- June 2022)
- (El Salvador) Manuel López (February 2022 -March 2023)
- (El Salvador) Juan Ramon Paredes (March 2023-June 2023)
- (El Salvador) Salvador Lovo (July 2023-Present)
- (El Salvador) Lázaro Gutiérrez
