= William Osorio =

Salvadoran footballer (1971–2026)

Personal information
- Full name: William Adalberto Osorio Rivera
- Date of birth: April 13, 1971
- Place of birth: San Salvador, El Salvador
- Date of death: October 5, 2026 (aged 55)
- Height: 1.71 m (5 ft 7 in)
- Position: Defender

Youth career
- 1987–1989: Coca Cola

Senior career*
Years	Team	Apps	(Gls)
1990–1996	FAS		
1997–1998	Luis Ángel Firpo		
1999–2005	FAS		
2005–2006	Isidro Metapán		
2007	Chalatenango		

International career
1991–2002	El Salvador	67	(0)

Managerial career
- 2008: Salvadoreño
- 2009–2011: FAS (assistant)
- 2017: San Rafael Cedros
- 2020: FAS (assistant)
- 2020: Marte Soyapango
- 2023: FAS (assistant)
- 2024: Zacatecoluca F.C.
- 2025: FAS (assistant)
- 2025-2026: Inter FA (Under 17)
- * Club domestic league appearances and goals

William Adalberto Osorio Rivera (April 13, 1971 – October 5, 2026) was a Salvadoran football player and manager.

== Club career ==
After coming through at Coca-Cola, for whom he made his debut in 1987 while in the Salvadoran second division, Osorio started his top level career with FAS and made his debut in August 1990 against Fuerte San Francisco. He won six league titles with FAS in two periods divided by a spell at Luis Ángel Firpo with whom he also won the league in 1998. He was a long time captain of FAS and after leaving FAS in the summer of 2005, he also played professionally for Isidro Metapán and Chalatenango of the Primera División de Fútbol de El Salvador.

== International career ==
Osorio made his debut for El Salvador in an April 1991 UNCAF Nations Cup qualification match against Nicaragua and has earned a total of 67 caps, scoring no goals. Osorio has been a national team stalwart for over 10 years and has represented his country in 18 FIFA World Cup qualification matches over three campaigns and played at the 1991, 1993, 1995, 1997, 1999 and 2001 UNCAF Nations Cups, as well as at the 1996 and 2002 CONCACAF Gold Cups.

His final international game was a January 2002 CONCACAF Gold Cup match against the United States.

== Personal life and death ==
Osorio was married and had two sons. He died on October 5, 2026, at the age of 55.

== Honours ==
=== As a player ===
FAS

- Primera División de El Salvador (7): 1995, 1996, 1998, 2002 Clausura, 2002 Apertura, 2004 Apertura, 2005 Clausura

Luis Angel Firpo

- Primera División de El Salvador: 1997–98

=== As a coach ===
Zacatecoluca

- Tercera Division: Apertura 2023, Clausura 2024
