= San Julián, El Salvador =

San Julián
- District
- Location in El Salvador
- Coordinates: 13°41′51.2″N 89°33′34.7″W
- Country: El Salvador
- Department: Sonsonate Department
- Municipality: Municipality of East Sonsonate

Area
  - Total: 31.52 sq mi (81.64 km^{2})
- Elevation: 167 ft (51 m)

Population (2007)
  - Total: 18,648
  - Density: 591.6/sq mi (228.4/km^{2})
- Time zone: UTC-6

San Julián is a district of the municipality of Sonsonate Este in the department of Sonsonate, El Salvador . According to the 2007 Population and Housing Census, it has 18,648 inhabitants. It was used as a battlefield several years ago and is now a beautiful and very populated neighborhood.

== History ==
The indigenous name of San Julián is Cacaluta, of Nahua origin . Around 1550 its population was estimated at 300 inhabitants. According to the mayor of San Salvador, Manuel de Gálvez Corral, the town of San Julián Cacaluza had four native tribes; their economic activities were the raising of chickens and in addition to the farming of corn and cotton, balm and cocoa were also farmed.

In 1770 it belonged to the parish of Guaymoco (present-day Armenia ).

=== Post-independence ===
In 1824 it was part of the district of Opico in the department of San Salvador; three years later it was part of the jurisdiction of the district of Izalco. In 1835 it was transferred to the district of Quezaltepeque and returned to the district of Izalco in 1836. According to a municipal report from 1859, the town produced cotton and coffee.

=== Small Town Status ===
On April 24, 1912, the town of San Julián was elevated to the title of "small town" by decree of the National Legislative Assembly; the decree was sanctioned on April 26 by the government of President Manuel Enrique Araujo. On April 11, 1913, the Ministry of Public Works agreed to the creation of a Special Public Works Board in the town of San Julián; this was chaired by the mayor, the vice president would be the Local Commander, the members were Mr. Ricardo Paniagua and Mr. Manuel Rivera Engelard, the secretary was Mr. Joaquín Valeriano Maza and the treasurer was Mr. Juan Antonio Trigueros. In 1966, it obtained the title of 'city'.

== General Information ==
The district of San Julián is bordered to the North by Izalco and Armenia, to the East by Armenia and Tepecoyo, (Depto. de la Libertad), to the South by Santa Isabel Ishuatán and Cuisnahuat, to the West by Cuisnahuat and Caluco. It is divided into 9 cantons and 30 hamlets and is located 40 km from the capital; the area of the municipality is 81.64 km^{2} and the capital has an altitude of 520 m above sea level.

The Nahuatl toponym Cacaluta means "The city of crows" or "Place of macaws". The patron saint festivities are celebrated from January 22 to 28 in honor of San Julián Obispo or Julián de Cuenca.

Currently this city has one of the most popular tourist activities, which is the Balm Route, since it has large extensions with crops of this medicinal tree.

== Protected Natural Areas ==
The district has the El Balsamar Natural Protected Area (ANP), which is shared with the municipality of Cuisnahuat. This area has an area of 48.66 hectares (69.62 blocks) located between the cantons of El Balsamar (Cuisnahuat) and Palo Verde (San Julián). This area is close to the Natural Protected Areas of Los Farallones Complex (San Julián-Caluco) and Plan de Amayo (Caluco), which, like the ANP El Balsamar, are located in the northern zone of the Los Cóbanos Conservation Area.

== Sports ==
The local football club is named C.D. Espartano and it currently plays in the Salvadoran Third Division.

== See also ==
- Puerto San Julián
