= C.D. Rácing Jr =

Salvadoran football club

Racing Junior de Armenia
- Full name: Club Deportivo Racing Junior
- Founded: 1951; 75 years ago, as San Juan and Club Deportivo Obrero
- Ground: Estadio 21 de Noviembre; Armenia, Sonsonate, El Salvador
- Chairman: (El Salvador) Lic. Ileana Trejo
- Manager: (El Salvador) Enzo Artiga
- League: (El Salvador) Segunda División
- 2015: Grupo Centro Occidente A, 4th
Home colours	Away colours

Club Deportivo Racing Junior de Armenia is a Salvadoran professional football club based in Armenia, Sonsonate, El Salvador.

The club currently plays in the Segunda División de Fútbol Salvadoreño.

== History ==
On 1951, a group of Armenia citizens decided to form a team which represented their community passion for football. The club started out as San Juan, before being named Club Deportivo Obrero, the club was soon renamed in honor of Racing, a famous Argentine football club. After changing name they won their first title in 1953, being promoted to Liga B (currently known as Tercera Division), for the next two decades the club would remain in the division, however in 1970, the club defeated local team Club Leones to be promoted to the Liga de Ascenso (currently known as Segunda Division). The club came close to promotion to the primera division in 1983 and 1985, however they were defeated on both occasion by Chalatenango and Dragon respectively. The club would be demoted to Tercera Division, In 2012, Racing Jr got revenge on Chalatenango by winning the playoff match.

They currently play in the segunda division.

On July 18,2024 Rácing Jr announced, due to economic reasons, they will not be competing in the Segunda division.

== Stadium ==
The club plays its home games at the Estadio 21 de Noviembre located at Armenia, Sonsonate, with a capacity of 2,329 seats.

== Honours ==
=== Domestic honours ===
==== Leagues ====
- Primera División Salvadorean and predecessors
  - Champions : N/A
- Segunda División Salvadorean and predecessors
  - Champions : N/A
  - Runners-up (2): 1983, 1985
- Tercera División Salvadorean and predecessors
  - Champions (2) : 1973, 2012
  - Play-off winner (2): 2013 ,2016

== Current squad ==
As of 15 January 2024: Note: Flags indicate national team as defined under FIFA eligibility rules; some limited exceptions apply. Players may hold more than one non-FIFA nationality.

No.	Pos.	Nation	Player
1	GK	ESA	Francis Urquilla
3	DF	ESA	Markin Duran
4	DF	ESA	Balmore Martir
5	DF	ESA	Dennys Sales
6	MF	ESA	Marlon Consuegra
7	MF	ESA	Brayan Obregon Jr.
9	FW	ESA	Rafael Burgo
11	FW	ESA	Wilber Moran
12	MF	ESA	Fredy Portillo
15	MF	ESA	Samuel Hernandez
16	FW	ESA	Luis Roman

No.	Pos.	Nation	Player
20	DF	ESA	Williams Pinto
22	MF	ESA	Gerardo Sorto
25	GK	ESA	David Aguilar
26	GK	ESA	Francisco Melendez
28	GK	ESA	Eduardo Cruz
30	MF	ESA	Cristian Villeda
31	MF	ESA	Noe Hernandez
33	MF	ESA	Paolo Ramirez
35	MF	ESA	Eduardo Pinto
37	MF	ESA	Marvin Anzora
99	FW	ESA	Brandon Obregon Jr.

== Coaching staff 2024/2025 ==
=== Coaching staff ===
As of February 2025

Position	Staff
Coach	(El Salvador) TBD
Assistant manager	(El Salvador) TBD
Reserve manager	(El Salvador) TBD
Goalkeeper Coach	(El Salvador) TBD
Under 17 Manager	(El Salvador) TBD
Under 15 Manager	(El Salvador) TBD
Sporting director	(El Salvador) TBD
Fitness Coach	(El Salvador) TBD
Team Doctor	(El Salvador) TBD
Kinesiologist	(El Salvador) TBD
Utility	(El Salvador) TBD

== Notable players ==
=== Internationals who have played at Racing ===
- (El Salvador) Jorge Búcaro
- (El Salvador) Mauricio Cienfuegos

== Coaches ==
- (El Salvador) Arnoldo Carios (1977)
- (El Salvador) Cristo Arnoldo Velásquez Farfán (1991)
- (El Salvador) Cristo Arnoldo Velásquez Farfán (2005)
- (El Salvador) Borís Romero (2012)
- (El Salvador) Jorge Búcaro (2014)
- (El Salvador) Elmer Guidos (2016–2017)
- (El Salvador) Enzo Artiga (2018– June 2018)
- (El Salvador) Fausto Omar el Bocho Vásquez (June 2018– March 2019)
- (El Salvador) Efren Marenco (March 2019 – October 2019)
- (El Salvador) Wilber Aguilar (October 2019 - March 2020)
- Hiatus (March 2020 - May 2021)
- (El Salvador) Jaime Medina (June 2021 - December 2021)
- (El Salvador) Angel Orellana (December 2021 - June 2022)
- (El Salvador) William Osorio (June 2022 - November 2022)
- (El Salvador) Enzo Artiga (November 2022 - July 2024)
- Hiatus (July 2024 - Present)
