= Brujos de Izalco F.C. =

Association football club in El Salvador

Brujos de Izalco
- Full name: Brujos Mario Calvo Fútbol Club
- Founded: 1958
- Ground: Estadio Salvador Mariona
- Capacity: Estadio Salvador Mariona, Izalco, Sonsonate
- Manager: Manuel Melgar
- League: Segunda División de El Salvador

Brujos Mario Calvo de Izalco Fútbol Club are a Salvadoran professional football club based in Izalco, Sonsonate.

The club currently plays in the Segunda División de El Salvador.

== History ==
The club purchased the license of Quequeisque F.C. to participate in the Segunda División in 2016.

== Honours ==
=== Domestic honours ===
- First Division of El Salvador
  - Champions: N/A
- Segunda División Salvadoreña and predecessors

Runners Up: (1) : Clausura 2018

- Tercera División Salvadoreña and predecessors
  - Champions: N/A

== Current squad ==
As of: Note: Flags indicate national team as defined under FIFA eligibility rules; some limited exceptions apply. Players may hold more than one non-FIFA nationality.

No.	Pos.	Nation	Player
1	GK	SLV	David Santos
2	DF	SLV	Marvin Martínez
4	DF	SLV	Benjamín Crespín
15	MF	SLV	Carlos Martínez
31	FW	COL	Mayer Gil
21	FW	COL	Lucas Gallardo

No.	Pos.	Nation	Player
7	FW	SLV	Julio Rivera

== President ==
- (El Salvador)

== List of coaches ==
- (El Salvador) Ricardo López Tenorio (1978 – 1980)
- (El Salvador) Jose Raul Chamagua (1993)
- (El Salvador) Milton Velásquez
- (El Salvador) Jorge Calles (Jan 2016 – Dec 2016)
- (El Salvador) Marcelo Escalante (Jan 2017 – Dec 2017)
- (El Salvador) Juan Ramón Paredes (Dec 2017 – June 2018)
- (Uruguay) Ruben Alonso (June 2018 – June 2019)
- (El Salvador) Manuel Melgar (Sep 2019 - )
