= F.C. Los Laureles =

- Full name: Futbol Clube Los Laureles
- Founded: 7 November, 2016
- Ground: Cancha Tiburones Rojos, Acajutla
- Chairman: (El Salvador)
- Manager: (El Salvador) Marvin Zepeda
- League: (El Salvador) Segunda División
- Grupo
Home colours	Away colours

Futbol Clube Los Laureles are a Salvadoran professional football club based in Acajutla, Sonsonate department, El Salvador. The club currently plays in the Second Division of El Salvador.

== History ==
After first season in the Tercera Division, the club won back to back titles, The club won the Apertura 2022 defeating INCA 3-1 . This was followed up defeating Esparanto 3-2 on penalties, after a 1-1 draw after 120 minutes. As dual champion allowed Los Laureles automatic promotion to the Segunda division.

== Honours ==
=== League ===
- Tercera Division and predecessors
- Champions: (2) : Apertura 2022, Clausura 2023
- La Asociación Departamental de Fútbol Aficionado and predecessors (4th tier)
  - Champions (1): 2021

== Sponsorship ==
Companies that Hercules currently has sponsorship deals with for 2025–2026 includes:

- (El Salvador) Elite sports – Official kit suppliers
- (China) Cemento Chino Wan Peng – Official sponsors
- (El Salvador) La Cueva Acajutla – Official sponsors
- (El Salvador) Eduardo Motto Dental – Official sponsors
- (El Salvador) Los Vidalles – Official sponsors
- (Mexico) Electrolit – Official sponsors

== Current squad ==
As of August 2025 Note: Flags indicate national team as defined under FIFA eligibility rules; some limited exceptions apply. Players may hold more than one non-FIFA nationality.

No.	Pos.	Nation	Player
4		SLV	Ulises Miron
12		SLV	Eduardo Tobar
19		SLV	Antonio Larios (captain)
20		SLV	Alexis Lopez

No.	Pos.	Nation	Player
23		SLV	Moises Valiente
25	GK	SLV	Kevin Cirollo
34		SLV	Harold Ruiz

=== Players with dual citizenship ===
- (El Salvador) (United States) TBD

=== In ===
Note: Flags indicate national team as defined under FIFA eligibility rules; some limited exceptions apply. Players may hold more than one non-FIFA nationality.

No.	Pos.	Nation	Player
—		SLV	TBD (From Free agent)
—		SLV	TBD (From Free agent)
—		SLV	TBD (From Free agent)

No.	Pos.	Nation	Player
—		SLV	TBD (From Free agent)
—		SLV	TBD (From Free agent)
—		SLV	TBD (From Free agent)

=== Out ===
Note: Flags indicate national team as defined under FIFA eligibility rules; some limited exceptions apply. Players may hold more than one non-FIFA nationality.

No.	Pos.	Nation	Player
—	DF	SLV	Anderson Sanchez (To Espartano)
—		SLV	Henry Campos (To Espartano)
—		SLV	Melvin Lue (To Espartano)
—		COL	Manuel Murillo (To Atletico Balboa)

No.	Pos.	Nation	Player
—		SLV	TBD (To TBD)
—		SLV	TBD (To TBD)
—		SLV	TBD (To TBD)

== Coaching staff ==
As of March 2025

Position	Staff
Manager	(El Salvador) Lzaro Gutierrez
Assistant Manager	(El Salvador) Jose Flamenco
Physical coach	(El Salvador) TBD
Goalkeeper Coach	(Colombia) TBD
Kineslogic	(El Salvador) TBD
Utility Equipment	(El Salvador) TBD
Football director	(El Salvador) TBD
Team Doctor	(El Salvador) TBD

== List of coaches ==
- (El Salvador) Jose Flamenco (2019-2023)
- (El Salvador) Marvin Zepeda (July 4, 2023-Present)
- (El Salvador) Mario Elias Guevara (November, 2023-July 2024)
- (Uruguay) Ruben Alonso (July 2024-October 2024)
- (El Salvador) Ricardo Lopez (October 2024- March 2025)
- (El Salvador) Lazaro Gutierrez (March 2025-Present)
