= Estadio Anna Mercedes Campos =

Stadium in Sonsonate, El Salvador

Coordinates: 13°43′41″N 89°43′25″W

- Interactive map of Estadio Anna Mercedes Campos
- Full name: Estadio Municipal de Sonsonate
- Former names: Estadio Municipal de Sonsonate
- Location: Sonsonate, El Salvador
- Capacity: 10,000
- Surface: Grass

Construction
- Renovated: 2015
- Cost: US$510,000

Tenants
- Sonsonate, 2009-2021; Alianza 2023-Present; Santa Tecla 2023-Present; RA Sonsonate; Tiburones de Sonsonate 2023-Present

Estadio Anna Mercedes Campos is a multi-use stadium in Sonsonate, El Salvador. It is currently used mostly for football matches and is the home stadium of Sonsonate. The stadium holds 10,000 spectators.

It is named after Ana Mercedes Campos "La Morocha", a javelin gold medallist in the 1954 Central American and Caribbean Games held in Mexico.
