= Tiburones de Sonsonate =

A.D. Tiburones de Sonsonate
- Full name: Tiburones de Sonsonate
- Founded: 2023
- Ground: Estadio Anna Mercedes Campos, Sonsonate
- Capacity: 5,000
- Chairman: (El Salvador) Pedro Contreras
- Manager: (El Salvador) Juan Carlos Palma
- League: (El Salvador) Segunda División
- 2023 Apertura: Overall: 2nd (); Playoffs: Quarter-final
Home colours	Away colours

Tiburones de Sonsonate is a Salvadoran professional football club based in Sonsonate, Sonsonate Department currently playing in Second Division. The club was established in June 2023 after the AD Destroyer franchise announced that it would be moving to the city of Sonsonate.

== History ==
On 11 July, it was officially announced that AD Destroyed was moving to Sonsonate, and that it would be rebranded as Tiburones de Sonsonate, as an entirely separate football club. On 12 July, Tiburones unveiled its crest and colours. The team colours are green and white.

On 16 January 2025 Tiburones de Sonsonate announced via their social media pages, they would be withdrawing from the Clausura 2025 due to lack of financial and fans support.

== Current squad ==
As of September, 2024. Note: Flags indicate national team as defined under FIFA eligibility rules; some limited exceptions apply. Players may hold more than one non-FIFA nationality.

No.	Pos.	Nation	Player
1	GK	SLV	Kevin Mancia
2	DF	SLV	Alexis Portillo
4	DF	SLV	Argenis Capacho
5		SLV	Alejandro Serrano
7	FW	SLV	Daniel Gomez
8	MF	SLV	Marco Avila
10	FW	SLV	Eder Polanco
11	FW	SLV	Diego Bigueur
12	MF	SLV	Diego Urrutia
14	FW	SLV	Marcos Rodriguez
19		SLV	Henry Cortez
20		SLV	Harold Ruiz
24	DF	SLV	Marvin Molina
30		SLV	Reynaldo Carpio
—	DF	SLV	Freddy Portillo
—		SLV	Cristian Rivera
—		SLV	Herberth Reyes
—	MF	SLV	Kevin Melendez
—	DF	SLV	Roberto Orellana
—	FW	SLV	Williams Lopez
—	GK	SLV	Luis Carranza
—		SLV	
—		SLV	

No.	Pos.	Nation	Player
3	DF	SLV	Kevin Molina
6	MF	SLV	Ricardo Rivera
8	MF	SLV	Fernando Quintanilla
19	FW	SLV	Levin Rojas
23	MF	SLV	Jorfen Najarro
29	FW	SLV	Brandon Amaya
31	MF	SLV	Jonathan Serrano
33	DF	SLV	Steven Aguilar

=== Players with dual citizenship ===
- (United States) TBD

=== In ===
Note: Flags indicate national team as defined under FIFA eligibility rules; some limited exceptions apply. Players may hold more than one non-FIFA nationality.

No.	Pos.	Nation	Player
—		COL	Cristian Caicedo (From Free agent)
—		SLV	Harold Ruiz (From Free agent)
—		SLV	Marvin Molina (From Free agent)

No.	Pos.	Nation	Player
—		SLV	Reynaldo Carpio (From Titan)
—		SLV	Herberth Reyes (From Free agent)
—		SLV	TBD (From Free agent)

=== Out ===
Note: Flags indicate national team as defined under FIFA eligibility rules; some limited exceptions apply. Players may hold more than one non-FIFA nationality.

No.	Pos.	Nation	Player
—		SLV	Levi Martinez (To Batanecos)
—		SLV	Maynor Serafin (To El Roble)
—		COL	Jefferson Viveros (To TBD)

No.	Pos.	Nation	Player
—		SLV	TBD (To TBD)

== Coaching staff ==
As of October 2024

Position	Staff
Manager	(El Salvador) Juan Ramon Paredes
Assistant Manager	(El Salvador)
Physical coach	(El Salvador) Osca Bolaños
Goalkeeper Coach	(Colombia) Cristian Gonzalez
Kineslogic	(El Salvador) Juan Panameño
Utility Equipment	(El Salvador) Juan Perez
Football director	(El Salvador) Eder Sanchez
Team Doctor	(El Salvador) Dra. Ken Chavez

== List of coaches ==
- (El Salvador) Raul Orellana (August 2023– September 2023)
- (El Salvador) Juan Ramon Paredes (September 2023– January 2024)
- (El Salvador) Ivan Ruiz (January 2024 – April 2024)
- (El Salvador) Juan Carlos Palma (April 2024 - July 2024)
- (El Salvador) Mario Elias Guevara (July 2024 - October 2024)
- (El Salvador) Juan Ramon Paredes (October 2024 - December 2024)
- Hiatus (January 2025 - Present)
