= A.D. Municipal =

- Full name: Asociacion Deportivo Municipal Juayúa
- Nickname: "Los Ades" y "Los Rojos"
- Founded: 14 October 1963
- Ground: Estadio Municipal de Juayúa, Juayua, Sonsonate, El Salvador
- Manager: Raúl Cocherari
- League: Tercera Division de Fútbol Salvadoreño
Home colours

Asociacion Deportivo Municipal Juayúa, also known simply as A.D. Municipal, is a professional football club based in Juayúa, El Salvador. They will play in Tercera Division de Fútbol Salvadoreño

== History ==
A.D. Municipal last played in the Salvadoran Second Division in 2010, when they were relegated after finishing bottom of Group A. They then played their home games in Nahuizalco.

== Current squad ==
As of: July 2025 Note: Flags indicate national team as defined under FIFA eligibility rules; some limited exceptions apply. Players may hold more than one non-FIFA nationality.

No.	Pos.	Nation	Player
1	GK	SLV	Emerson Retana
2	DF	SLV	Josue Ibanez
3	DF	SLV	Zahir Martinez
4	DF	SLV	Steve Lara
5	MF	SLV	Kevin Siciliano
6	DF	SLV	Gabriel Menendez
7	FW	SLV	Kevin Flores
8		SLV	Aldair Sanchez
9		SLV	Irvin Ochoa
10	MF	SLV	Riquelme Batres
11		SLV	Herberth Reyes
12	FW	SLV	Julio Guzman
14	MF	SLV	Francisco Herrera
15	MF	SLV	Carlos Adrian Catalan

No.	Pos.	Nation	Player
16	MF	SLV	Miguel Liquez
17	MF	SLV	Hansel Rivera
19		SLV	F Jacobo
23	DF	SLV	Cristian Flores
24	MF	SLV	Felipe Lemus
25	GK	SLV	Marcelo Erazo
—	MF	SLV	Josue Albanez
—	MF	SLV	Mario Siciliano
—		SLV	Rodrigo Vega

=== Players with dual citizenship ===
- (El Salvador) (United States) TBD

=== In ===
Note: Flags indicate national team as defined under FIFA eligibility rules; some limited exceptions apply. Players may hold more than one non-FIFA nationality.

No.	Pos.	Nation	Player
—		SLV	Rodrigo Vega (From TBD)
—		SLV	TBD (From TBD)
—		SLV	TBD (From TBD)
—		SLV	TBD (From TBD)

No.	Pos.	Nation	Player
—		SLV	TBD (From TBD)
—		SLV	TBD (From TBD)
—		SLV	TBD (From TBD)

=== Out ===
Note: Flags indicate national team as defined under FIFA eligibility rules; some limited exceptions apply. Players may hold more than one non-FIFA nationality.

No.	Pos.	Nation	Player
—		SLV	TBD (To TBD)
—		SLV	TBD (To TBD)
—		SLV	TBD (To TBD)
—		SLV	TBD (To TBD)

No.	Pos.	Nation	Player
—		SLV	TBD (To TBD)
—		SLV	TBD (To TBD)
—		SLV	TBD (To TBD)

== Personnel ==
=== Coaching staff ===
As of June 2025

Position	Staff
Coach	(El Salvador) Ricardo Antonio Lopez (*)
Assistant manager	(Guatemala) TBD (*)
Reserve manager	(Guatemala) TBD (*)
Goalkeeper Coach	(El Salvador) Ricardo Membreno (*)
Under 17 Manager	(Guatemala) TBD (*)
Under 15 Manager	(Guatemala) TBD (*)
Sporting director	(Guatemala) TBD (*)
Fitness Coach	(El Salvador) Rafael Agreda (*)
Team Doctor	(Guatemala) TBD (*)
Fitness Coach	(Guatemala) TBD (*)
Physiotherapy	(Guatemala) TBD (*)
Utility	(Guatemala) TBD (*)

== List of coaches ==
- (El Salvador) Manuel Molina (1959)
- (El Salvador) Julio Magaña (1975)
- (El Salvador) Jorge Wilmer Patrick (2002)
- (El Salvador) Ricardo Antonio López (2003)
- (El Salvador) Ricardo "Coneja" Guardado
- (El Salvador) Pedro Antonio Contreras
- (El Salvador) Ángel Orellana (2007)
- (Argentina) Raúl Héctor Cocherari
- (El Salvador) TBD ( - June 2025)
- (El Salvador) Ricardo Antonio Lopez (June 2025 -Present)
