= C.D. Salvadoreño =

Salvadoran football club

- Full name: Club Deportivo Salvadoreño
- Founded: 1917 as ATLACATL
- Ground: Estadio 21 de Noviembre, Armenia, El Salvador
- Chairman: Jorge Mazariego
- League: ADFA Sonsonate
- Clausura 2012: Grupo Centro Occidente A, 7th
Home colours

Club Deportivo Salvadoreño are a Salvadoran professional football club based in Armenia, El Salvador.

The club currently plays in the Third Division.

== History ==
The club was formed in 1917 by a group of citizens from Armenia, being first named as ATLACATL, before changing their name to Sandino, in on honor of Nicaraguan rebel Augusto César Sandino. After minimal success and the fact the club wanted to represent the region better. On May 1924, C.D. Sandino renamed and rebranded themselves as Club Deportivo Salvadoreño.

== Stadium ==
- Estadio 21 de Noviembre (1956–Present)
  - Cancha de Ferrocarril (1917–1959) games played in this location, before moving to Cancha Lícida
  - Cancha de Lícida (1960–00) Salvadoreno home ground before moving to the TBD.

Salvadoreno plays its home games at Estadio 21 de Noviembre located in Sonsonate, The stadium has a capacity of 10,000 people.

== Notable players ==
- (El Salvador) Edgar Henríquez (1984)
- (El Salvador) Salvador Edmundo Portillo Preza

== Coaches ==
- (El Salvador) Cristo Arnoldo Velasquez (2003–2005)
- (El Salvador) Jorge Búcaro (2005–2006)
- (El Salvador) Wilber Aguilar (2022)
- (El Salvador) Ricardo Navarro
