= Armenia, El Salvador =

Armenia
- Municipality
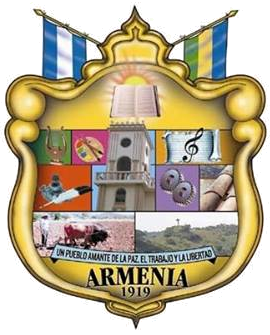
- Flag Seal

- Location in El Salvador
- Coordinates: 13°45′N 89°30′W
- Country: El Salvador
- Department: Sonsonate Department

Population
  - Total: 34,912

Armenia is a municipality in the Sonsonate department of El Salvador. It was founded by Spaniards and a small group of Armenians, with a significant number of indigenous people living there when Europeans arrived. According to the official census of 2007, it has a population of 34,912 inhabitants.

== History ==
The City of Armenia in Sonsonate, El Salvador, was founded by Spanish colonizers during the period of colonization in Latin America. Specific details about the founders may not be available, but in general, the region's cities were established by Spanish expeditions and colonizers in the 16th and 17th centuries. The arrival and establishment of the Armenian community in that region, the founders of Armenia in Sonsonate, El Salvador, were mainly Armenian and Spanish immigrants, who are of European origin, specifically from the Caucasus region in Eurasia and Galicia (Spain). Although Armenians and Spaniards were an important community in the founding of Armenia, Sonsonate, there was also a presence of indigenous people in the region, given the colonial history of El Salvador. The mixture of different communities contributed to the cultural diversity in the formation of the town.

The name of this town was originally "Guaymoco" in ancient Pipil dialect of Nahuat and means "the oratory of the frogs".

== Sports ==
The local professional football clubs are named C.D. Salvadoreño and Rácing Junior and they both currently play in the Salvadoran Third Division.
