= C.D. Cruzeiro =

Salvadoran football club

- Full name: Club Deportivo Cruzeiro
- Founded: 1986
- Ground: Mini Estadio Candelaria Abajo, San Vicente
- Chairman: (El Salvador)
- Manager: (El Salvador) Alexi Guerra
- League: (El Salvador) Segunda División
- Grupo
Home colours	Away colours

Club Deportivo Cruzeiro are a Salvadoran professional football club based in Candelaria Abajo, San Cayetano Istepeque, San Vicente department, El Salvador. The club currently plays in the Second Division of El Salvador.

== History ==
In June 2023. Cruzeiro won the Tercera Division Clausura 2023 title against Los Andes by a score of 2–0. This granted the club an opportunity to play against historic club Santiagueño, although the club lost the playoff, the club was inivited to participate in 2023-2024 Segunda division.

In June 2026, It was announced that club had new owners and will be re-branded as Independiente San Vicente.

== Honours ==
=== League ===
- Tercera Division and predecessors
- Champions: (1) : Clausura 2023
- La Asociación Departamental de Fútbol Aficionado' and predecessors (4th tier)
  - Champions (1): 2021

== Sponsors ==
- (El Salvador) PS Sports
- (El Salvador) Agua Inmaculada
- (Mexico) Electrolit

== Current squad ==
Updated January 2026. Note: Flags indicate national team as defined under FIFA eligibility rules; some limited exceptions apply. Players may hold more than one non-FIFA nationality.

No.	Pos.	Nation	Player
1	GK	SLV	Anderson Granados
2	FW	SLV	Édgar Valladares
5	DF	SLV	Anderson Ochoa
7	FW	SLV	Isai Aguilar
8	MF	SLV	Óscar Castillo
9	DF	SLV	Orsy Rodríguez
10	FW	SLV	Anderson Perla
11	MF	SLV	Ricardo Pollo
12	DF	COL	Tardelis Peña
13	MF	SLV	Óscar Mejía

No.	Pos.	Nation	Player
14	MF	SLV	Diego Rodríguez
16	DF	SLV	Wilber Rivas
17	MF	SLV	Mauricio Rodríguez
20	FW	SLV	Wilber Andrade
21	FW	SLV	Dylan Portillo
22	DF	SLV	Jorge Valle
23	DF	SLV	Cesar Rodríguez
27	DF	SLV	Samuel Reyes
28	DF	SLV	Daniel Telles

== Notable players ==
- (El Salvador) Silvio Aquino

== Coaching staff ==
As of January 2026

Position	Staff
Manager	(El Salvador) Guillermo Rivera
Assistant Manager	(El Salvador) Salvador Velasquez
Physical coach	(El Salvador) Adilio Hernandez
Goalkeeper Coach	(El Salvador) TBD
Kineslogist	(El Salvador) Giovani Canales
Utility Equipment	(El Salvador) TBD
Utility Equipment	(El Salvador) TBD
Football director	(El Salvador) TBD
Team Doctor	(El Salvador) TBD

== Non-playing staff ==
=== Management ===
As of May, 2026

Position	Name
Owner	(United States) Grupo Luis Cuao Brand (Colombia) Grupo Inversor de Manizales
President	(Colombia) Vacant
Vice-president	(Colombia) Vacant
Gerente Deportivo	(El Salvador) Vacant
Administrative Director	(El Salvador) Vacant
Deputy managing director	(El Salvador) Vacant
Treasurer	(El Salvador) Vacant
Executive Director	(El Salvador) Vacant
Sporting director	(El Salvador) Vacant

== List of coaches ==
- (El Salvador) Alonzo Aguilar (June 8, 2022 - August 17, 2022)
- (El Salvador) Ricardo Garcia (December 18, 2022 - July 3, 2023)
- (Uruguay) Ruben Alonso (July 4, 2023-March 2024)
- (El Salvador) Guillermo Rivera (March 2024- July 2024)
- (El Salvador) Ivan Ruiz (July 2024- June 2025)
- (El Salvador) Marvin Alexi Guerra (June 2025- Present)
