= C.D. Olímpico Litoral =

- Full name: Club Deportivo Olímpico Litoral
- Founded: 1945
- Ground: Complejo Deportivo Rafael Lopez, Loma Larga
- Chairman: (El Salvador) Neftali Rodriguez
- Manager: (Argentina) Nino Piazzi
- League: Liga de Ascenso
- League Group: Grupo Centro Oriente B Team colors

Club Deportivo Olímpico Litoral is a Salvadoran professional football club based in Loma Larga, La Unión Department, El Salvador.

The club currently plays in the Liga de Ascenso.

== Honours ==
=== Domestic honours ===
==== Leagues ====
- Tercera División Salvadorean and predecessors
  - Champions (2) : N/A
  - Play-off winner (2):
- La Asociación Departamental de Fútbol Aficionado and predecessors (4th tier)
  - Champions (1):
  - Play-off winner (2):

== Current squad ==
As of August 2026 Note: Flags indicate national team as defined under FIFA eligibility rules; some limited exceptions apply. Players may hold more than one non-FIFA nationality.

No.	Pos.	Nation	Player
—		SLV	Adonis Josue Amaya
—	GK	SLV	Alejandro Caso
—		SLV	Alexander Molina
—		SLV	Angel Echeverria
—		SLV	Christopher Portillo
—		SLV	David Dimas
—		SLV	Dilber Leonel Hernandez
—		SLV	Diego Hernandez
—		SLV	German Olivar
—		ARG	Gabriel Vega
—		SLV	Jairo Estrada
—		SLV	Jason Lopez

No.	Pos.	Nation	Player
—		SLV	Jefferson Palacios
—		SLV	Juan Benitez
—		SLV	Josue Benitez
—		SLV	Juan David
—		SLV	Justin Martinez
—		SLV	Kevin Contreras
—		SLV	Melvin Benitez
—		SLV	Pedro Maldonado
—		SLV	Ricardo Polio
—		SLV	Robin Borjas (captain)

=== In ===
Note: Flags indicate national team as defined under FIFA eligibility rules; some limited exceptions apply. Players may hold more than one non-FIFA nationality.

No.	Pos.	Nation	Player
—		ARG	Gabriel Vega (from TBD)
—		SLV	Robin Borjas (from Fuerte San Francisco)
—		SLV	Dimas Ismael (from TBD)
—		SLV	Melvin Benitez (from TBD)

No.	Pos.	Nation	Player
—		SLV	German Olivar (from TBD)
—		SLV	Angel Echeverria (from TBD)
—		SLV	Dilber Hernandez (from TBD)

=== Out ===
Note: Flags indicate national team as defined under FIFA eligibility rules; some limited exceptions apply. Players may hold more than one non-FIFA nationality.

No.	Pos.	Nation	Player
—	GK	SLV	Ismael Valladares (TBD)
—		SLV	Anderson Perla (TBD)
—		SLV	Antonio Larios (TBD)
—		SLV	Jefferson Diaz (TBD)
—		SLV	Meyson Ascencio (TBD)
—		SLV	Jayder Membreno (TBD)
—		SLV	Cristian Alexander Elias (TBD)
—		SLV	Brayan Josue Izaguirre (TBD)
—		SLV	Arquimedes Canales (TBD)
—		SLV	Nelson Guevara (TBD)

No.	Pos.	Nation	Player
—		SLV	Javier Fuentes (TBD)
—		SLV	Oscar Torres (TBD)
—		COL	Carlos Duban Mosquera (TBD)
—		SLV	Gerbe Reyes (TBD)
—		SLV	Kevin Perez (TBD)
—		SLV	Ismael Chavez (TBD)

== Notable players ==
- (El Salvador) Raul Salamanca
- (El Salvador) Andres Barrera
- (El Salvador) Armando Alvarenga
- (El Salvador) Pedro Neftali Castro
- (El Salvador) Enrique del cid
- (El Salvador) Angel Barrera
- (El Salvador) Pedro Maltez
- (El Salvador) Martin Rivera
- (El Salvador) Ricardo Granados
- (El Salvador) Alcides Salinas

== Coaching staff ==
As of December 2025

Position	Staff
Manager	(El Salvador) Totti Pocasangre
Assistant manager	(El Salvador) Jose Lovato
Physical coach	(El Salvador) Nathan Rivera
Goalkeeper coach	(El Salvador) TBD
Kineslogic	(El Salvador) TBD
Utility equipment	(El Salvador) TBD
Football director	(El Salvador) Geovanny Cruz
Team doctor	(El Salvador) TBD

== List of coaches ==
- (El Salvador) Oscar Alvarez (2017-2018)
- (El Salvador) William Chevez (2017)
- (El Salvador) Roberto Chavez (September 2022-November 2022)
- (El Salvador) Marvin Rosales (September 2022, 1 game)
- (El Salvador) William Chevez (November 2022-present)
- (El Salvador) Marvin Rosales (February 2024-present)
- (El Salvador) Kilmar Jimenez (May 2024-August 2024)
- (El Salvador) David Paz (August 2024-December 2024)
- (El Salvador) Francisco Robles (January 2025-February 2025)
- (Argentina) Ángel Piazzi (March 2025- December 2025)
- (El Salvador) Totti Pocasangre (December 2025-July 2026)
- (El Salvador) Alvaro Canizales (August 2026 -present)
