= C.D. Vendaval Apopa =

Association football club in El Salvador

- Full name: Club Social Deportivo Vendaval
- Nicknames: Agónico, Los Apopenses "Rojiazules"
- Founded: 27 March 1927; 99 years ago
- Ground: Estadio Joaquín Gutierrez, Apopa, El Salvador
- Owner: TBD
- Head coach: (El Salvador) Bairon Acevedo Amayes
- League: (El Salvador) Liga de Ascenso
Home colours	Away colours

Club Social Deportivo Vendaval or Vendaval is a professional football club based in the Salvadoran city of Apopa.

The club currently plays in the Liga de Ascenso.

== History ==
The club most successful campaign was the 1987-1988 season. Vendaval reached the final against ADET, however Vendaval lost the match and this was the closest Vendaval would get to reach the first division.

In 2012, the club was forced to merge with Chalatenango to form Chalatenango-Vendaval because of financial difficulties and they currently play in the second division. However after one season, In 2013 the partnership between Chalatenango and Vendaval ended and they split into two teams again, with Vendaval remaining in the second division while Chalatenango descended to the third division.

Prior to the start of the 2024 Clausura season Vendaval suffered a major crisis with several experienced players leaving the club. Vendaval was able to assemble a squad predominantly made of youth players yet the club suffered a horrible campaign losing every game and only scoring three goals. Vendaval were relegated to the third division.

== Honours ==
=== Domestic honours ===
- Segunda División Salvadorean and predecessors
  - Runners up (1) : 1987-1988
- Tercera División Salvadorean and predecessors
  - Champions:(1) : Apertura 2025 (Centro-Occidental)
  - Play-off runners up (1): 2025-2026

== Club records ==
=== Top goalscorers ===
No.	Player	period	Goals
	(El Salvador) TBD	TBD-TBD	TBD
	(El Salvador) TBD	TBD-TBD	TBD
	(El Salvador) TBD	TBD-TBD	TBD
	(El Salvador) TBD	TBD-TBD	TBD
	(El Salvador) TBD	TBD-TBD	TBD
	(El Salvador) TBD	TBD-TBD	TBD
	(El Salvador) TBD	TBD-TBD	TBD
	(El Salvador) TBD	TBD-TBD	TBD
	(El Salvador) TBD	TBD-TBD	TBD
	(El Salvador) TBD	TBD-TBD	TBD
10	(El Salvador) Eduardo Merino	2021-2022	25

Note: Players in bold text are still active with Vendaval

== Stadium ==
Vendaval plays its home games at Estadio Joaquin Gutierrez in Apopa.

- Estadio Joaquin Gutierrez (1983-Present)
  - Estadio Luis Amílcar Moreno; San Francisco Gotera (1995) Vendaval was suspended for two games from their home stadium and forced to play at Estadio Luis Amilcar Morneo.

== Current squad ==
As of: August 2026 Note: Flags indicate national team as defined under FIFA eligibility rules; some limited exceptions apply. Players may hold more than one non-FIFA nationality.

No.	Pos.	Nation	Player
—		ESA	Alejandro Saenz
—		ESA	Marcos Portillo
—		ESA	Marlon Duarte
—		ESA	Luis Aguilar
—		ESA	Anderson Chiquillo
—		ESA	Fernando Mancia
—		ESA	Wilbert Chavez
—		ESA	Kevin Vela
—		ESA	Cristofer Chinchilla
—		ESA	Cleverson Garay

No.	Pos.	Nation	Player
—		ESA	Jaime Vaquero
—		ESA	Edson Moisa
—		ESA	Efrain Rodas
—		ESA	Jefferson Chiquillo
—		COL	Sebastian Garzon
—		ESA	Danilo Dominguez
—		ESA	Jonás Sola
—		ESA	Daniel Paiz
—		ESA	Gustavo Lainez
—	GK	ESA	Herbert Martínez

=== Players with dual citizenship ===
- (El Salvador) (Italy) Luis Aguilar

=== In ===
Note: Flags indicate national team as defined under FIFA eligibility rules; some limited exceptions apply. Players may hold more than one non-FIFA nationality.

No.	Pos.	Nation	Player
—		COL	Sebastian Garzon (From Free agent)
—		ESA	Luis Aguilar (From Platense)
—		ESA	TBD (From Free agent)
—		ESA	TBD (From Free agent)
—		ESA	TBD (From Free agent)
—		ESA	TBD (From Free agent)

No.	Pos.	Nation	Player
—		ESA	TBD (From Free agent)
—		ESA	TBD (From Free agent)

=== Out ===
Note: Flags indicate national team as defined under FIFA eligibility rules; some limited exceptions apply. Players may hold more than one non-FIFA nationality.

No.	Pos.	Nation	Player
—		ESA	Levi Martínez (To TBD)
—		ESA	Xavi Leonel Rivas (To TBD)
—		ESA	Cristian Rodríguez (To TBD)
—		ESA	William Pinto (To TBD)
—		ESA	Carlos Constanza (To TBD)

No.	Pos.	Nation	Player
—		ESA	Jesús Marroquín (To TBD)
—		ESA	Christian Hidalgo (To TBD)
—		ESA	Adrián Aquino (To TBD)
—		ESA	Jefferson Pacas (To TBD)

== Notable players ==
Note: this list includes players that have appeared in at least 100 league games and/or have earned international caps.

- (El Salvador) Victor Coreas
- (El Salvador) Juan Diaz
- (El Salvador) Rommel Mejía
- (El Salvador) Cesar Larios
- (Nicaragua) Cyril Errington

== Coaching staff ==
As of October 2026

Position	Staff
Manager	(El Salvador) Milton Meléndez
Assistant Manager	(El Salvador) TBD
Reserve Manager	(El Salvador) TBD
Ladies's Manager	(El Salvador) TBD
Physical coach	(El Salvador) TBD
Assistant Physical coach	(El Salvador) TBD
Goalkeeper Coach	(El Salvador) TBD
Kineslogic	(El Salvador) TBD
Utility Equipment	(El Salvador) TBD
Football director	(El Salvador) TBD
Team Doctor	(El Salvador) TBD

=== Management ===
Position	Staff
Owner	CSD VENDAVAL
President	(El Salvador)
Vice President	(El Salvador)
Secretary	(El Salvador)
Sportraadslid	(El Salvador)

== Managerial history ==
Name	Nationality	Tenure
Francisco Zamora	El Salvador	TBD–TBD
Fausto Omar Vásquez "El Bocho"	El Salvador	1986
Juan Ramón Paredes	El Salvador	1986–1987
Raúl Corcio Zavaleta	El Salvador	1994
Mario Sotelo	El Salvador	1995
Jorge Juarez	El Salvador	1997
Ricardo Alarcón	El Salvador	TBD, 2001
Ricardo Herrera	El Salvador	January, 2002 – TBD, 2002
Manuel Alarcón	El Salvador	August 2006 - October 2006
Raúl Héctor Cocherari	Argentina	November, 2006 -
Fausto Omar "El Bocho" Vásquez	El Salvador	TBD, 2007
Manuel Alarcón	El Salvador	August 2007 -
Víctor Girón Huezo	El Salvador	TBD, 2008
Juan Carlos Carreño	Chile	TBD, 2008
Edgar Henriquez "Kiko"	El Salvador	TBD, 2009 – TBD, 2010
Ángel Orellana	El Salvador	TBD, 2010
Marcos Portillo "el Clavo"	El Salvador	TBD, 2012
Jorge Calles	El Salvador	TBD, 2013
Carlos Orellana	El Salvador	TBD, 2014 – December, 2014
Angel Chiquillo	El Salvador	January, 2015 – June, 2015
Carlos Orellana	El Salvador	TBD, 2015 – TBD, 2016
Francisco Hernandez	El Salvador	October, 2016 – TBD, 2016
Carlos Mauricio Sortelo	El Salvador	TBD, 2016 – August, 2017
Héctor Jara	Chile	August, 2017 – May, 2018
Pablo Quiñonez	Uruguay	July, 2018 – September, 2018
Bairon Alvarez	El Salvador	september, 2018 – January, 2019
Jorge Calles	El Salvador	January, 2019 – March 2019
Osmin Orellana	El Salvador	March, 2019 – July 2019
Christian Lopez	El Salvador	August, 2019 – October 2019
Bayrón Álvarez (Interim)	El Salvador	October 2019
Osmin Orellana	El Salvador	November, 2019 – March, 2020
Alonzo Aguilar	El Salvador	January, 2021 – March 2021
Angel Orellana	El Salvador	March, 2021 – April 2021
Angel Hernandez	El Salvador	April, 2021 – May 2021
Luis Landos	El Salvador	June, 2021 – July 2021
Ramirez Moisa	El Salvador	July, 2021 – September 2021
Jorge Calles	El Salvador	September, 2021 – May 2022
Jorge Molina	El Salvador	June 2022 - October
Francisco Hernandez	El Salvador	October 2022 - June 2023
Fausto Omar Vásquez "El Bocho"	El Salvador	July 2023 - August 2023
Ramon Avila Sugar	El Salvador	August 2023 - September 2023
Ramon Preza Jr	El Salvador	September 2023 - TBD
Bairon Acevedo Amayes	El Salvador	July 2024 - February 2025
Rene Lopez	El Salvador	March 2025 - May 2025
David Omar Sevilla	El Salvador	May 2025 - February 2026
Fabricio Moisés Trejo	El Salvador	March 2026 - July 2026
Ulises Monge	El Salvador	August 2026 - September 2026
Milton Meléndez	El Salvador	October 2026 - Present
