= San Sebastián, El Salvador =

San Sebastián
- Municipality
- Location in El Salvador
- Coordinates: 13°44′N 88°50′W
- Country: El Salvador
- Department: San Vicente Department
- Elevation: 2,175 ft (663 m)

San Sebastián is a municipality in the San Vicente department of El Salvador.

== Church Of San Sebastián ==
It's settled in the city of the same name, head of the district and municipality of San Sebastian 49 km away from San Salvador and at 660 meters above sea level. It is ignored who built it or when, but it is known that in 1770 San Sebastian was a Valley belonging to the rectory of San Vicente.

Its style is composed by two bodies divided by very marked cornices. The inferior body is decorated with eight paired columns of ionic style and mounted on square basements. The main access has a form of arch of half point finished off by a decoration of classical style.

The superior body is decorated with two Tuscan columns and an oval in the center of the combined body; it's finished off by cornices of classical style and two pinnacles to each side of the superior and inferior body. The superior body possesses a cross and it's finished off by scrolls.

The interior of the church consists of a wing divided in three bodies by 14 columns and has two lateral accesses. It has three altars, the principal and two others embedded to the lateral walls. It has also a pulpit and the sacristy is located to a side of the presbytery. The principal altar receives illumination from two windows placed in the back side of the church.

San Sebastian has belonged through the ages to Ilobasco, Cabañas until July 1836 on which it was incorporated again to the department of San Vicente. The Patron festivity is celebrated from January 15 to 31, in honor of San Sebastian.
