= C.D. Espartano =

Association football club in El Salvador

Club Deportivo Espartano
- Full name: C.D. Espartano
- Founded: 1934; 92 years ago
- Ground: Estadio Ricardo Paredes INDES; San Julián, Sonsonate, El Salvador / Polideportivo Helene Arias
- Capacity: 3500
- Chairman: Bryan Arias
- Coach: Wilber Aguilar "Largo"
- League: Tercera Division de Fútbol Salvadoreño
- Clausura 2024: Grupo Centro Occidente A, 1st
Home colours

Club Deportivo Espartano is a Salvadoran professional football club based in San Julián, Sonsonate, El Salvador.

The club currently plays in the Tercera Division de Fútbol Salvadoreño.

== History ==
Espartano won the Clausura 2024, Tercera Division de Fútbol Salvadoreño Centro-Occidente title defeating Talleres Jr 2–1, thanks to goals from Kevin Leonor and Deyber Rosales.

== Honours ==
=== Domestic honours ===
==== Leagues ====
- Tercera División Salvadorean and predecessors
  - Champions (1) : Clausura 2024
  - Play-off winner (2):
- La Asociación Departamental de Fútbol Aficionado and predecessors (4th tier)
  - Champions (1):
  - Play-off winner (2):

== Current squad ==
As of: January 2026 Note: Flags indicate national team as defined under FIFA eligibility rules; some limited exceptions apply. Players may hold more than one non-FIFA nationality.

No.	Pos.	Nation	Player
1	GK	SLV	Moises Portillo
4	MF	SLV	Pablo Campos
5	MF	SLV	Henry Campos
6	MF	SLV	Jorge Garcia
7	MF	SLV	Melvin Lue
9	FW	SLV	Bryan Obregon Jr
14		SLV	Carlos Roque
20	DF	SLV	Emerson Romero
23	MF	SLV	Enrique de Leon (captain)
28	MF	SLV	Mario Cordero
30	MF	SLV	Reinaldo Carpio

No.	Pos.	Nation	Player
—	GK	SLV	Luis Escamilla
—		SLV	Carlos Montoya
—	MF	SLV	Alexis Menendez
—	DF	SLV	Ricardo Armas
—		SLV	Fernando Cardonna
—		SLV	Sergio Ramirez
—	FW	SLV	Luis Merino
—		SLV	Maynor Brenes
—		SLV	Emanuel Cuellar
—		SLV	Josue Perez
—	MF	SLV	Arnulfo Paredes

=== In ===
Note: Flags indicate national team as defined under FIFA eligibility rules; some limited exceptions apply. Players may hold more than one non-FIFA nationality.

No.	Pos.	Nation	Player
—		SLV	Sergio Ramirez (from Batanecos)
—		SLV	Emanuel Cuellar (from Escuela Futbol San Julian)
—		SLV	Carlos Roque (from Juventud Candelareño)
—		SLV	Fernando Cardonna (from Santiagueno)

No.	Pos.	Nation	Player
—		SLV	Luis Granados (from El roble)
—		SLV	Cristian Rivera (from Buenos Aires F.C.)
—		SLV	Francisco Zepeda (from INCA)
—		SLV	TBD (from TBD)

=== Out ===
Note: Flags indicate national team as defined under FIFA eligibility rules; some limited exceptions apply. Players may hold more than one non-FIFA nationality.

No.	Pos.	Nation	Player
—		SLV	Melvin Castro (to TBD)
—		SLV	Anderson Sanchez (to TBD)
—		SLV	Rodolfo Huezo (to TBD)
—		SLV	Deyber Rosales (to TBD)
—		SLV	Joshua Sandoval (to TBD)

No.	Pos.	Nation	Player
—		SLV	Balmore Mendez (to Izalco)
—		SLV	Franklin Galdamez (to TBD)
—		SLV	William Lopez (to TBD)
—		SLV	(to TBD)

== Personnel ==
=== Management ===
Position	Staff
Owner	
President	(El Salvador)
Vice-president	(El Salvador)
Team representative	(El Salvador)

=== Coaching staff ===
As of October 2025

Position	Staff
Coach	(El Salvador) Ennio Mendoza
Assistant coach	(El Salvador) Raul Orellana
Fitness coach	(El Salvador) Mauricio Herrera
Goalkeeper coach	(El Salvador)
Club doctor	(El Salvador) Carolina Marquez
Kineslogist	(El Salvador) Jose Alfredo Portillo
Sport massagist	(El Salvador) Jose Francia
Sports utility 1	(El Salvador) Oscar ruiz
Sports utility 2	(El Salvador) Carlos Cortez
Sports utility 3	(El Salvador) Pedro Castro

== List of coaches ==
- (El Salvador) Didnisio Hernandez (2009)
- (Uruguay) Carlos Asdrubal Padin (August 2021–TBD)
- (El Salvador) Wilber Aguilar (2023-September 2025)
- (El Salvador) Ennio Mendoza (October 2025-present)
- (El Salvador) Ricardo Navarro
