= A.D. Batanecos =

Association football club in El Salvador

- Full name: Asociación Deportiva Batanecos
- Nickname: AD Batanecos
- Founded: 2023
- Ground: Estadio Juan Francisco Molina; San Sebastan, San Vicente, El Salvador
- Chairman: Manrique Alfaro
- League: Tercera División de Fútbol Salvadoreño
- Grupo Centro Oriente A, 4th
Home colours	Away colours

Asociación Deportiva Batanecos is a Salvadoran professional football club based in San Sebastan, San Vicente, El Salvador.

The club currently plays in the Tercera Division de Fútbol Salvadoreño.

== Honours ==
=== Domestic honours ===
==== Leagues ====
- Tercera División de Fútbol Salvadoreño and predecessors
  - Champions (2) : N/A
  - Play-off winner (2):
- La Asociación Departamental de Fútbol Aficionado' and predecessors (4th tier)
  - Champions (1):
  - Play-off winner (2):

== Colours, kits and sponsorship ==
=== Uniform evolution ===
- Primary

2024–	2025 -Present

- Alternate

2024-2025	2025–

=== Sponsorship ===
Companies that Batanecos currently has sponsorship deals with for 2025-2026 include:

- (El Salvador) Galaxia – official kit suppliers
- (Mexico) Electroli – official sponsors
- (United States) Guiliane Construction LLC – official sponsors
- (El Salvador) Acodjar – official sponsors

=== Kit makers ===
Years	Kit manufacturers
2023–2024	(El Salvador) PS Sports
2025–Present	(El Salvador) Galaxia

== Current squad ==
As of: June 2025 Note: Flags indicate national team as defined under FIFA eligibility rules; some limited exceptions apply. Players may hold more than one non-FIFA nationality.

No.	Pos.	Nation	Player
4	DF	COL	Victor Hinestroza
6	FW	SLV	Moises Rivas (Captain)
10	FW	SLV	Carlos Velasco
19	FW	SLV	Fernando Villalta
52	MF	SLV	Kevin Alvarenga

== List of coaches ==
- (El Salvador) Ricardo García (August 2023 - June 2024)
- (El Salvador) Édgar Flores (June 2024 - December 2024)
- (El Salvador) Roberto Antonio Hernández (December 2024 - February 2026)
- (El Salvador) Miguel Soriano (February 2026 - Present)
