= 2022–23 Segunda División de Fútbol Salvadoreño =

Segunda División de Fútbol Salvadoreño
- Season: 2022-23
- Champions: Apertura 2022: Fuerte San Francisco, Clausura 2023: Titán
- Promoted: Fuerte San Francisco
- Relegated: A.D. Masahuat and Gerardo Barrios
- Matches: 56
- Goals: 129 (2.3 per match)
- Top goalscorer: Apertura 2022: Jonathan Nolasco (Destroyer) (18 goals); Clausura 2023: Yerson Tobar (Cacahuatique) (12 goals)
- Biggest home win: Apertura 2022: Once Lobos 8–0 AD Masahuat (20 October 2022); Clausura 2023: Cacahuatique 8–0 El Vencedor (3 April 2022); Clausura 2023:
- Biggest away win: Apertura 2022: Gerardo Barrios 1-6 Ilopango FC (20 November 2022); Clausura 2023: AD Masahuat 2-6 Titan (1 May 2023)
- Highest scoring: Apertura 2022: Dragon 7-3 C.D. Gerardo Barrios (26 September 2021); Clausura 2023: Inter Sivar 5-5 C.D. Rácing Jr (4 May 2023)
- Longest winning run: Apertura 2022: 4 matches TBD
- Longest unbeaten run: Apertura 2022: 7 matches TBD
- Longest winless run: Apertura 2022: 7 matches TBD
- Longest losing run: Apertura 2022: 4 matches TBD
- Highest attendance: Apertura 2022: 3,465; TBD 3–0 TBD (1 August 2021)
- Lowest attendance: Apertura 2022: 189; TBD vs TBD (19 August 2021)
- Total attendance: Apertura 2022: TBD
- Average attendance: Apertura 2022: TBD
- Stats are from the regular season only

The 2022–23 season (officially known as Liga de Plata and also as Torneo Luis Baltazar Ramírez) was El Salvador's Segunda División de Fútbol Salvadoreño. The season was split into two championships: Apertura 2022 and Clausura 2023. The champions of the Apertura and Clausura play the direct promotion playoff every year. The winner of that series ascends to Primera División de Fútbol de El Salvador.

== Changes to the 2022–23 seasons ==
Teams promoted to 2022–23 Primera División de El Salvador

- Dragon

Teams relegated to Segunda División de Fútbol Salvadoreño - Apertura 2022

- Municipal Limeno.

Teams relegated to Tercera Division de Fútbol Salvadoreño - Apertura 2022

- AD Santa Rosa
- El Vencedor

Teams promoted from Tercera Division de Fútbol Salvadoreño - Apertura 2022

- A.D. Masahuat
- Club Deportivo Pipil

New teams or teams that purchased a spot in the Segunda division

- Atletico Balboa (purchased spot of Aspirante)

Teams that failed to register for the Apertura 2022

- Aspirante (sold spot to Atlético Balboa)

== Notable events ==
=== FESFUT removal and games suspensions ===
On the 20th of July, the Governmental National Sports Institute (INDES) in association with the attorney general raided the Salvadoran Football Federation (FESFUT) in relation to money laundering and fraudulent administration. INDES issued an administrative resolution ordering the dismissal of FESFUT directors and the creation of a Normalizing Commission.

As a result of this internal crisis, all three main divisions games from round 2 to 4 were suspended due to referees not showing up.

FIFA could suspend El Salvador if its state-led sports institute removes the heads of the Salvadoran Football Federation (FESFUT) in favor of hand-picked officials, according to a letter shared by the federation online.

After a month and a half and with the imposition of a FIFA Regulation Committee in the FESFUT, plus the delivery of credentials by INDES, the second division obtained the green light to be able to resume their tournament, which was interrupted after a disputed date.

The Segunda Division announced on September 1, 2022 that the season would resume the Apertura 2022 tournament on September 17, 2022. The final would be played on 14 January.

=== AD Juyua-Municipal ===
It was announced by the club president that due to high cost, minimal support and lack of sponsorship, the club would sell their spot in Segunda division. In January 2023 it was announced that Nuevo Cuscatlán FC had purchased the spot and would participate in 2023 Clausura season. The club was to move to Nuevo Cuscatlán and play at Estadio Municipal Florencia.

=== Clubs' failure to register for 2023 Clausura ===
Ilopango FC, Marte Soyapango and Real Atlético Sonsonate failed to register for the 2023 Clausura season as all three owed unpaid salaries to players, coaching staff and the league.

== Managerial changes ==
=== Before the start of the season ===
Team	Outgoing manager	Manner of departure	Date of vacancy	Replaced by	Date of appointment	Position in table
C.D. Topiltzin	(El Salvador) Sebastian Hernandez	Mutual agreement	2022	(El Salvador) Ervin Loza	June 2022	th (2022 Clausura)
Real Atletico Sonsonate	(El Salvador) TBD	Mutual agreement	2022	(El Salvador) Nelson Mauricio Ancheta	June 2022	th (2022 Clausura)
Ilopango FC	(El Salvador) Fredy Santos	Mutual agreement	2022	(El Salvador) Rudy Cedillos	2022	th (2022 Clausura)
Gerardo Barrios	(Honduras) Efrain Nunez	Mutual agreement	2022	(Brazil) Eraldo Correia	2022	th (2022 Clausura)
El Vencedor	(El Salvador) Erasmo Lazo	Mutual agreement	2022	(Argentina) Juan Oficialdeg	2022	th (2022 Clausura)
C.D. Cacahuatique	(El Salvador) Omar Sevilla	Mutual agreement	2022	(El Salvador) Jorge Abrego	June 2022	th (2022 Clausura)
Corinto FC	(El Salvador) Rolando Perez	Mutual agreement	2022	(El Salvador) Victor Coreas	June 2022	th (2022 Clausura)
C.D. Titán	(El Salvador) Jorge Abrego	Mutual agreement	2022	(El Salvador) Juan Ramón Sánchez	June 2022	th (2022 Clausura)
Marte Soyapango	(El Salvador) Mauricio Alfaro	Mutual agreement	2022	(El Salvador) Ernesto Gochez	2022	th (2022 Clausura)
AD Destroyer	(El Salvador) Rodolfo Gochez	Resigned due to contract dispute	2022	(El Salvador) Miguel Soriano	2022	th (2022 Clausura)
C.D. Rácing Jr	(El Salvador) Angel Orellana	Mutual agreement	2022	(El Salvador) William Osorio	2022	th (2022 Clausura)
Atletico Balboa	(Argentina) Roberto Gamarra	Mutual agreement	2022	(El Salvador) Omar Sevilla	2022	th (2022 Clausura)
AD Municipal	(El Salvador) Edgar Batres	Mutual agreement	2022	(El Salvador) Ennio Mendoza	2022	th (2022 Clausura)
San Pablo	(Honduras)	Sacked	September 2022	(El Salvador) Luis Saravia	September, 2022	8th Grupo Oriente (2023 Clausura)
Vendaval	(El Salvador)	Mutual agreement	2022	(El Salvador) Jorge Molina	June 2022	th (2022 Clausura)

=== During the Apertura season ===
Team	Outgoing manager	Manner of departure	Date of vacancy	Replaced by	Date of appointment	Position in table
CD Masahuat	(El Salvador) Ramon Sugar Aviles	Sacked	7 September 2022	(El Salvador) Carlos Mauricio Rodriguez	10 September 2022	7th (2022 Apertura)
Vendaval	(El Salvador) Jorge Molina	Resigned due to contract dispute	October 1, 2022	(El Salvador) Francisco Hernandez	October 1, 2022	10th Grupo Occidente (2023 Clausura)
Limeno	(Honduras) German Rodriguez	Sacked	October 30, 2022	(El Salvador) Saul Prudenció	October 1, 2022	8th Grupo Oriente (2023 Clausura)
Atletico Balboa	(El Salvador) Omar Sevilla	Sacked	November 14, 2022	(Colombia) Luis Carlos Asprilla	November, 2022	2nd Grupo Oriente (2023 Clausura)

=== Between the Apertura and Clausura season ===
Team	Outgoing manager	Manner of departure	Date of vacancy	Replaced by	Date of appointment	Position in table
Racing Jr	(El Salvador) William Osorio	Sacked	November, 2022	(El Salvador) Enzo Artiga	November 25, 2022	th (2023 Clausura)
Atletico Balboa	(Colombia) Luis Carlos Asprilla	Ended interimship	December 12, 2022	(El Salvador) Misael Alfaro	December 13, 2022	th (2023 Clausura)
Real Atletico Sonsonate	(El Salvador) Nelson Ancheta	Contract finished	December 2022	(El Salvador) TBD	2022	th (2023 Clausura)
Gerardo Barrios	(Brazil) Eraldo Coreira	Contract not renewed	December 2022	(El Salvador) Omar Sevilla	December 2022	th (2023 Clausura)
Once Lobos	(Argentina) Enzo Enriquez	Mutual consent	December 19, 2022	(El Salvador) Nelson Ancheta	December 2022	th (2023 Clausura)
Municipal Limeno	(El Salvador) Saul Prudenció	Mutual consent	December 2022	(El Salvador) Jose Romero	December 2022	th (2023 Clausura)
San Pablo Tacachico	(El Salvador) Luis Saravia	Mutual consent	December 2022	(El Salvador) Jose Angel Reyes	January 2023	th (2023 Clausura)
Cacahuatique	(El Salvador) Jorge Abrego	Mutual consent	December 2022	(El Salvador) Carlos Romero	January, 2023	th (2023 Clausura)
AD Inter Sivar	(El Salvador) Juan Carlos Melgar	Resigned due to contract dispute	2022	(El Salvador) Mario Villatoro	December 31, 2022	th (2023 Clausura)
Topiltzin	(El Salvador) Ervin Loza	Sacked	December 2022	(El Salvador) Geovany Trigueros	January 7, 2022	th (2023 Clausura)

=== Clausura seasons ===
Team	Outgoing manager	Manner of departure	Date of vacancy	Replaced by	Date of appointment	Position in table
Corinto	(El Salvador) Victor Coreas	Mutual consent (became coach to Jocoro)	March 1, 2023	(El Salvador) Amilcar Alfonso Guzman	March 3, 2023	th (2023 Clausura)
Gerardo Barrios	(El Salvador) Omar Sevilla	Mutual consent (became coach to Atletico Marte)	March 4, 2023	(El Salvador) Luis Ramírez Zapata	March, 2023	th (2023 Clausura)
AD Destroyer	(El Salvador) Miguel Soriano	Sacked	March 14, 2023	(El Salvador) Cristian Lopez	March 18, 2023	th (2023 Clausura)
TBD	(El Salvador) TBD	Resigned due to contract dispute	May 2019	(El Salvador) TBD	July 2019	th (2023 Clausura)

== Apertura 2022 ==
=== Teams ===
Only 20 teams chose to participate in this season championship.

Team	City	Stadium	Head coach	Captain	Foreign players
Atletico Balboa	La Union	Estadio Marcelino Imbers	(El Salvador) Omar Sevilla	(El Salvador) Blas Lizama	(Colombia) Andres Vallecilla * (Brazil) Jackson de Oliveira *
Atletico Real Sonsonate	Sonsonate	Estadio Ana Mercedes Campos	(El Salvador) Nelson Mauricio Ancheta	(El Salvador) N/A	(Colombia) Daley Mena * (Colombia) TBD
AD Destroyer	Puerto de La Libertad	Cancha Chilama	(El Salvador) Miguel Soriano	(El Salvador) Michael Lopez *	(Colombia) Adrian Ararat * (Uruguay) Brayan Obregón
Cacahuatique	Ciudad Barrios, San Miguel	Complejo Deportivo Chapeltique	(El Salvador) Jorge Abrego	(El Salvador) Cristian Portillo *	(Colombia) Luis Aroleda Murillo * (Colombia) Yerson Javier Tobar *
Corinto FC	Corinto, Morazan	Estadio Municipal Corinto	(El Salvador) Victor Coreas	(El Salvador) N/A	
Fuerte San Francisco	San Francisco Gotera, Morazan	Estadio Correcaminos	(Uruguay) Pablo Quinones	(El Salvador) Daniel Marquez *	(Uruguay) Stivens Maciel * (Paraguay) Javier Lezcano *
CD Gerardo Barrios		Cancha Municipal de San Rafael Oriente	(Brazil) Eraldo Correia	(El Salvador) N/A	(Colombia) Fary Mancilla (Brazil) Josielson Moraes
Ilopango FC	TBD	Estadio Joaquin Gutierrez Apopa	(El Salvador) Rudy Cedillos	(El Salvador) N/A	(Colombia) Luis Felipe Ruiz Tapia * (Colombia) Bryan Zuluga
Inter San Salvador	Santa Tecla	Estadio las Delicias	(El Salvador) TBD	(El Salvador) N/A	(Colombia) Miguel Murillo *
Masahuat		Estadio Municipal Masahuat	(El Salvador) Ramon Aviles	(El Salvador) Geovany Ulloa	No foreign players
Municipal Juayua FC		Estadio Jose Milan Morales	(El Salvador) Enio Mendoza	(El Salvador) Eder Polanco	(Colombia) TBD (Colombia) TBD
Marte Soyapango	Soyapango	Cancha Jorgito Melendez	(El Salvador) Ernesto Gochez	(El Salvador) Erick Molina	(Colombia) Jose Medrano * (Colombia) Argenis Alba
Municipal Limeno	Santa Rosa	Estadio Flores Berrios	(Honduras) German Rodriguez	(El Salvador) Felix Sanchez	(Brazil) Leandro Soares * (Honduras) Elix Coello *
Once Lobos	Santa Ana	Estadio 11 Lobos	(Argentina) Enzo Enriquez	(El Salvador) N/A	(Colombia) Yefersson Palacios * (Colombia) Alvaro Moreno *
Pipil	Cacaopera, Morazon	Estadio Paul Fuentes	(El Salvador) Oscar Amaya	(El Salvador)	(Colombia) Hector Lemos * (Colombia) Yeferson Palacios
Rácing Jr	Armenia, Sonsonate	Estadio 21 de Noviembre Armenia	(El Salvador) William Osorio	(El Salvador) Freddy Portillo	(Brazil) Joseilson Moraes * (Colombia) Brayan Obregón *
San Pablo Municipal		Cancha de Valle Mezas	(El Salvador) Edgardo Batres	(El Salvador)	(Colombia) Ronaldinho Caicedo Solis *
Titan	Texistepeque, Santa Ana	Cancha de futbol CD Titan	(El Salvador) Juan Ramon Sanchez	(El Salvador) Rosemberg Cueva *	(Colombia) Manuel Murillo * (Colombia) Devier Chaverra *
C.D. Topiltzín	Jisquilisco	Estadio Topiltzin de Jiquilisco	(El Salvador) Ervin Loza	(El Salvador) Ever Corto	(Colombia) William Guerrero (Colombia) Jose Miguel Medrano
Vendaval	Apopa	Estadio Joaquin Gutierrez	(El Salvador) Jorge Molina	(El Salvador) Alan Gonzalez	(Colombia) Boris Polo (Colombia) Alvaro Moreno

=== Regular seasons ===
==== Centro Oriente ====
Pos	Team	Pld	W	D	L	GF	GA	GD	Pts	Qualification or relegation
1	Real Destroyer	18	15	2	1	54	18	+36	47	Advance to Playoffs
2	Titan	18	13	3	2	50	27	+23	42	Advance to Playoffs
3	Inter Silver Sivar	18	11	3	4	41	19	+22	36	Advance to Playoffs
4	Municipal F.C.	18	9	3	6	29	18	+11	30	Advance to Playoffs
5	San Pablo Tacachico	18	9	2	7	29	23	+6	29	
6	Once Lobos	18	6	2	10	28	39	−11	20	
7	Real Atletico Sonsonate	18	4	6	8	26	37	−11	18	
8	Rácing Jr	18	5	2	11	28	45	−17	17	
9	Vendaval	16	3	0	13	17	38	−21	9	
10	AD Masahuat	18	2	2	14	19	54	−35	8	

Rules for classification: 1) points; 2) goal difference; 3) number of goals scored.

==== Centro Occidente ====
Pos	Team	Pld	W	D	L	GF	GA	GD	Pts	Qualification or relegation
1	Cacahuatique	18	12	3	3	29	15	+14	39	Advance to Playoffs
2	Balboa	18	9	6	3	24	14	+10	33	Advance to Playoffs
3	Fuerte San Francisco	18	8	6	4	20	19	+1	30	Advance to Playoffs
4	Marte Soyapango	18	8	5	5	25	17	+8	29	Advance to Playoffs
5	Ilopango FC	18	8	3	7	24	22	+2	27	
6	Corinto FC	18	5	8	5	20	22	−2	23	
7	Municipal Limeno	18	7	3	8	26	19	+7	24	
8	CD Pipil	18	5	4	9	30	27	+3	19	
9	Gerardo Barrios	18	3	2	13	14	47	−33	11	
10	Topiltzin	18	3	4	11	20	30	−10	13	

Rules for classification: 1) points; 2) goal difference; 3) number of goals scored.

==== Centro Oriente ====
Rank	Player	Club	Goals
1	(El Salvador) Jonathan Nolasco	Real Destroyer	18
2	(Colombia) Diego Chaverra	Titan	15
3	(Colombia) R Caicedo	San Pablo	13
4	(Colombia) R Caicedo	San Pablo	12
5	(Colombia) Daley Mena	RA Sonsonate	12

==== Centro Occidente ====
Rank	Player	Club	Goals
1	(Colombia) Hector Lemos	Pipil	15
2	(El Salvador) TBD	Fuerte San Francisco	12
3	(Colombia) TBD	Cachuatique	10
4	(El Salvador) TBD	Marte Soyapango	10
5	(El Salvador) TBD	Topiltzin	9

== Finals ==
=== Centro Oriente Conference ===
November 27, 2022
15:00

AD Municipal Juayua	0-2	A.D. Destroyer
nil		Cristian Caicedo; Jonathan Nolasco

Cancha Milan Morales, Juayua

December 4, 2022

A.D. Destroyer	1-1	AD Municipal Juayua
Cristian Caicedo 30'		Jonathan Urrutia 23'

Real Destroyer won 3–1 on aggregate.

November 25, 2022
15:00

Inter Silva	1-0	Titan
Diego Bigueur		nil

Cancha Tito Varela, San Luis Talpa

December 4, 2022

Titan	6-0	Inter Siva
Diego Chaverra; Reynaldo Carpio; Felix Sanchez; Felipe Flores		Nil

Titan won 6–1 on aggregate.

=== Centro Occidente Conference ===
November 26, 2022
15:00

Marte Soyapango	0-1	Cacahuatique
nil		Cristian Portillo

Cancha Jorgito Melendez, Soyapango

December 4, 2022

Cacahuatique	4-0	Marte Soyapango
Cristian Portillo; Antonio Tony Maravilla; Wilber Chicas		Nil

Cacahuatique won 4–0 on aggregate.

November 27, 2022
15:00

Fuerte San Francisco	3-1	Atletico Balboa
Alexander Marquez; Axer Lopez		Jackson de Oliveira

Estadio Correcaminos, San Francisco Gotera

December 4, 2022

Atletico Balboa	0-0	Fuerte San Francisco
Nil		Nil

Fuerte San Francisco won 3–1 on aggregate.

=== Centro Oriente Conference ===
December 11, 2022
15:00

Titan	1-0	AD Destroyer
Rosemberg Cueva 41'		nil

Cancha Titan

December 18, 2022
14:00

AD Destroyer	4-1	Titan
Jonathon Nolasco 58'; Eduardo Merino 69'; Ernesto Crespin; Cristian Caicedo		Devier Chaverra 38'

Cancha Chilama

AD Destroyer won 4–2 on aggregate.

=== Centro Occidente Conference ===
December 11, 2022
15:00

Fuerte San Francisco	2-0	Cacahuatique
Alexander Marquez		nil

Estadio Correcaminos, Morazon

December 18, 2022
15:30

Cacahuatique	3-2	Fuerte San Francisco
Yerson Tobar; Roberto Carlos Sol		Alexander Márquez

Centro Ecologico El Amaton, Ciudad Barrios, San Miguel

Fuerte San Francisco won 4–3 on aggregate.

=== Grand final ===
December 24, 2022
11:00 am

AD Destroyer	0-2	Fuerte San Francisco
Nil	[]	Diego Ortez 7'; Javier Luna 58'

Estadio Antonio Toledo Valle, Zacatecoluca

AD destroyer
GK	(El Salvador) Christopher Rauda
DF	(El Salvador) Ernesto Crespin
DF	(El Salvador) Marvin Molina
DF	(El Salvador) Alejandro Serrano
DF	(El Salvador) Cristian Burgos
MF	(El Salvador) Michael Lopez	Substituted off
MF	(El Salvador) Will Castillo
MF	(El Salvador) Alexis Ramos	Substituted off
FW	(El Salvador) Eduardo Merino
FW	(Colombia) Cristian Caicedo
FW	(El Salvador) Jonathon Nolasco	Substituted off
Substitutes:
FW	(El Salvador) TBD	Substituted in
MF	(El Salvador) TBD	Substituted in
MF	(El Salvador) TBD	Substituted in
Manager:
(El Salvador) Miguel Sorianp

Fuerte San Francisco:
GK	(El Salvador) Carlos Jose Melendez
DF	(El Salvador) Giuviny Esquivel
DF	(El Salvador) Francisco Carballo
DF	(El Salvador) Ronald Torres
DF	(El Salvador) Javier Luna
DF	(El Salvador) Alexander Marquez (substituted off)
MF	(El Salvador) Carlos Marquez
MF	(Uruguay) Cristhian Stivens Maciel
MF	(El Salvador) Diego Ortez
FW	(El Salvador) Kevin Cruz
FW	(El Salvador) Alexander Rodriguez	Substituted off
Substitutes:
FW	(El Salvador) TBD	Substituted in
FW	(El Salvador) TBD	Substituted in
Manager:
(Uruguay) Pablo Quinones

Apertura 2022 champions
Fuerte San Francisco
2nd title

=== Individual awards ===
Hombre GOL	Best Goalkeeper Award
(El Salvador) Johnathan Nolasco; AD Destroyer	(El Salvador) Josue Funes; Cacahuatique

== Clausura 2023 ==
=== Teams ===
Only 17 teams registered for the 2023 Clausura. Three clubs (Ilopango FC, Marte Soyapango and Real Atlético Sonsonate) failed to register due lack of payments. AD Juayua sold their spot to Atlético Nacional Cuscatleco.

Team	City	Stadium	Head coach	Captain	Foreign players
Atletico Balboa	La Union	Estadio Marcelino Imbers	(El Salvador) Misael Alfaro *	(El Salvador) Jefrey Cruz	(Paraguay) Javier Lezcano * TBD *
AD Destroyer	Puerto de La Libertad	Cancha Chilama	(El Salvador) Miguel Soriano	(El Salvador)	(Colombia) Jeison Estupian * (Colombia) Cristian Caicedo *
Cacahuatique	Ciudad Barrios, San Miguel	Complejo Deportivo Chapeltique	(El Salvador) Carlos Romero *	(El Salvador) N/A	(Colombia) Jerson Torvar * (Colombia) Julian Grueso *
Corinto	Corinto, Morazan	Estadio Municipal Corinto	(El Salvador) Victor Coreas *	(El Salvador) N/A	(Colombia) Argenis Alba * (Colombia) Jose Medrano *
Fuerte San Francisco	San Francisco Gotera, Morazan	Estadio Correcaminos	(Uruguay) Pablo Quinones *	(El Salvador) N/A	(Uruguay) Cristhian Stivens Maciel * (Colombia) Cristian Vaquero *
Gerardo Barrios	San Rafael Oriente, El Salvador.	Cancha Municipal de San Rafael Oriente	(El Salvador) Omar Sevilla *	(El Salvador) N/A	(Colombia) Fernando Cortez * (Colombia) Camilo Quinores Caicedo *
Inter San Salvador	Santa Tecla	Estadio las Delicias	(El Salvador) Mario Villatoro *	(El Salvador) Miguel Murillo *	(Colombia) Luis Alberto Perea * TBD *
Masahuat	Masahuat, Santa Ana department	Estadio Municipal Masahuat	(El Salvador) Ramon Aviles	(El Salvador) Geovany Ulloa	No foreign players
Atletico Nacional Cuscatleco - Juyua	Nuevo Cuscatlan	Estadio Municipal Florencia	(El Salvador) Ernesto Gochez	(El Salvador) TBD	TBD * TBD *
Municipal Limeno	Santa Rosa	Estadio Flores Berrios	(El Salvador) Jose Romero *	(El Salvador) Felix Sanchez	(Colombia) William Palacios * (Colombia) Brayan Díaz *
Once Lobos	Santa Ana	Estadio 11 Lobos	(El Salvador) Nelson Mauricio Ancheta *	(El Salvador) Luis Castro *	(Argentina) Gustavo Machado * (Colombia) David Quinonez *
Pipil	Cacaopera, Morazon	Estadio Paul Fuentes	(El Salvador) Oscar Amaya	(El Salvador)	(Colombia) Duvan Mosquera * TBD *
Rácing Jr	Armenia, Sonsonate	Estadio 21 de Noviembre Armenia	(El Salvador) Enzo Artiga *	(El Salvador) Manuel Alvarado *	(Colombia) Brayan Obregon * (Brazil) Josielson Moraes *
San Pablo Municipal	San Pablo Tacachico, La Libertad	Cancha de Valle Mezas	(El Salvador) Jose Angel Reyes	(El Salvador) Amilcar Flores *	(Colombia) Ronaldinho Caicedo Solis * (Colombia) Fabricio Moreno *
Titan	Texistepeque, Santa Ana	Cancha de futbol CD Titan	(El Salvador) Juan Ramón Sánchez *	(El Salvador) Bryan Ortega	(Colombia) Devier Chaverra * (Colombia) Manuel Murillo *
C.D. Topiltzín	Jisquilisco	Estadio Topiltzin de Jiquilisco	(El Salvador) Geovani Trigueros *	(El Salvador) Ever Corto	(Colombia) Walter Gomez * (Colombia) Leider Palmera *
Vendaval	Apopa	Estadio Joaquin Gutierrez	(El Salvador) Francisco Hernandez *	(El Salvador) Alan Gonzalez	TBD * TBD *

=== Regular seasons ===
==== Centro Oriente ====
Pos	Team	Pld	W	D	L	GF	GA	GD	Pts	Qualification or relegation
1	Rácing Jr	16	6	7	3	23	21	+2	25	Advance to Playoffs
2	San Pablo Tacachico	16	6	7	3	25	18	+7	25	Advance to Playoffs
3	Titan	16	6	6	4	27	19	+8	24	Advance to Playoffs
4	AD Destroyer	16	7	3	6	30	24	+6	24	Advance to Playoffs
5	Municipal/Atletico Nacional	16	7	3	6	28	25	+3	24	
6	Vendaval	16	4	6	6	22	25	−3	18	
7	Inter Silver Sivar	16	3	9	4	20	25	−5	18	
8	Once Lobos	16	4	6	6	19	24	−5	18	
9	AD Masahuat	16	4	3	9	21	34	−13	15	

Rules for classification: 1) points; 2) goal difference; 3) number of goals scored.

==== Centro Occidente ====
Pos	Team	Pld	W	D	L	GF	GA	GD	Pts	Qualification or relegation
1	Fuerte San Francisco	14	7	4	3	23	16	+7	25	Advance to Playoffs
2	Cacahuatique	14	8	1	5	20	14	+6	25	Advance to Playoffs
3	CD Pipil	14	6	5	3	23	17	+6	23	Advance to Playoffs
4	Balboa	14	6	4	4	20	14	+6	22	Advance to Playoffs
5	Municipal Limeno	14	4	5	5	19	18	+1	17	
6	Gerardo Barrios	14	4	3	7	16	26	−10	15	
7	Topiltzin	14	4	2	8	11	21	−10	14	
8	Corinto FC	14	2	6	6	20	26	−6	12	

Rules for classification: 1) points; 2) goal difference; 3) number of goals scored.

==== Centro Oriente ====
Rank	Player	Club	Goals
1	(Colombia) Yerson Tobar	Cacahuatique	12
2	(Colombia) TBD	TBD	00
3	(Colombia) TBD	TBD	00
4	(Colombia) TBD	TBD	00
5	(Colombia) TBD	TBD	00

==== Centro Occidente ====
Rank	Player	Club	Goals
1	(El Salvador) TBD	TBD	00
2	(El Salvador) TBD	TBD	00
3	(El Salvador) TBD	TBD	00
4	(El Salvador) TBD	TBD	00
5	(El Salvador) TBD	TBD	00

== Finals ==
=== Centro Oriente Conference ===
May 13, 2023
14:30

Atletico Balboa	0-1	Fuerte San Francisco
Nil		Harold Alas

Estadio Marcelino Imbers, La Union

May 20, 2023

Fuerte San Francisco	0-1	Atletico Balboa
Nil		Cristian Reyes

Estadio Correcaminos, San Francisco Gotera, Morazon

1-1 on aggregate. Atletico Balboa won 6–5 on penalties.

May 13, 2023
14:30 pm

CD Pipil	2-2	Cacahuatique
Antonio Ramos 71' 94'		Yerson Tobar 42'; Roberto Sol 54'

Cancha Paul Fuentes, Cacaopera

May 21, 2023

Cacahuatique	1-1	CD Pipil
Yerson Tobar		TBD number 26 own goal

Cancha El Amaton, Ciudad Barrios, San Miguel

3-3 on aggregate. Pipil won 4–2 on penalties.

=== Centro Occidente Conference ===
May 14, 2023
15:00

AD Destroyer	1-0	San Pablo Tacachico
Cristian Caicedo		nil

Estadio Chilama, Puerte de La Libertad

May 28, 2023

San Pablo Tacachico	0-0	AD Destroyer
Nil		Nil

Cancha Valle Meza, San Pablo Tacachico

AD Destroyer won 1–0 on aggregate.

May 14, 2023
15:00

Titan	1-0	C.D. Rácing Jr
Reinaldo Carpio 32'		Nil

Cancha Titan, Texistepeque

May 28, 2023

C.D. Rácing Jr	0-2	Titan
Nil		Reinaldo Carpio

Cancha de Armenia, Armenia, Sonsonate

Titan won 3–0 on aggregate.

=== Centro Oriente Conference ===
June 4, 2023
14:30

Atletico Balboa	1-1	CD Pipil
Cristian Reyes 41'		Hector Lemus 51'

Estadio Marcelino Imbers, La Union

June 11, 2023
14:00

CD Pipil	1-2	Atletico Balboa
Emir Gonzalez		Cristian Reyes

Cancha El Amaton, Ciudad Barrios, San Miguel

Atletico Balboa won 3–2 on aggregate.

=== Centro Occidente Conference ===
June 4, 2023
14:30

AD Destroyer	0-1	Titan
Nil		David Diaz 84'

Estadio Chilama, Puerte de La Libertad

June 11, 2023

Titan	4-0	AD Destroyer
Devier Chaverra; Denis García; Manuel Murillo y Jesús Ochoa		Nil

Cancha Titan, Texistepeque

Titan won 5–0 on aggregate.

=== Grand final ===
June 18, 2023
14:30 pm

Titan	2(4)-2(3)	Atletico Balboa
Devier Chaverra 17'; Manuel Murillo 28'		Cristian Huezo 23'; Eldin Aparicio 69'

Estadio Antonio Toledo Valle, Zacatecoluca

Titan
GK	1	(El Salvador) Ernesto Paz
DF	15	(El Salvador) Jose Orellana
DF	6	(El Salvador) Julio Cerritos
DF	4	(El Salvador) Rosemberg Cueva
DF	3	(El Salvador) Felix Sanchez
MF	32	(El Salvador) Kevin Hernandez
MF	19	(El Salvador) Mario Gutierrez
MF	27	(El Salvador) Diego Cartagena
MF	11	(El Salvador) Dennis Garcia
FW		(Colombia) Manuel Murillo
FW		(Colombia) Devier Chaverra	Substituted off
Substitutes:
FW		(El Salvador) TBD	Substituted in
MF		(El Salvador) TBD	Substituted in
MF		(El Salvador) TBD	Substituted in
Manager:
(El Salvador) Juan Ramón Sánchez

Atletico Balboa:
GK	25	(El Salvador) Carlos Aleman
DF	23	(El Salvador) Christian Reyes
DF	20	(El Salvador) Francisco Valladarez
DF	5	(El Salvador) Juna Hernandez
DF	4	(El Salvador) Javier Fuentes
DF	7	(El Salvador) Dannis Cerros
MF	32	(El Salvador) Florentin Alvarez
MF	15	(El Salvador) Heriberto Velasquez
MF	14	(El Salvador) Eldin Aparicio
FW	17	(El Salvador) Gabriel Alvarez
FW	9	(Paraguay) Javier Lezcano
Substitutes:
FW		(El Salvador) Cristian Huezo	Substituted in
FW		(El Salvador) TBD	Substituted in
Manager:
(El Salvador) Misael Alfaro

Clausura 2023 champions
Titán
3rd title

=== Individual awards ===
Hombre GOL	Best Goalkeeper Award
(Colombia) Yerson Tobar; Cacahuatique	(El Salvador) Ever Coto; Cacahuatique
