= 2018–19 Segunda División de Fútbol Salvadoreño =

Segunda División de Fútbol Salvadoreño
- Season: 2018–19
- Champions: Apertura: El Vencedor, Clausura: San Pablo
- Promoted: El Vencedor
- Relegated: None

The 2018–19 season (officially known as Liga de Plata and also as Torneo Luis Baltazar Ramírez) will be El Salvador's Segunda División de Fútbol Salvadoreño. The season will be split into two championships, Apertura 2018 and Clausura 2019. The champions of the Apertura and Clausura play the direct promotion playoff every year. The winner of that series ascends to Primera División de Fútbol de El Salvador.

== Changes from the 2017–18 seasons ==
Teams promoted to 2018–19 Primera División de Fútbol Profesional season

- Jocoro F.C.

Teams relegated to Segunda División de Fútbol Salvadoreño - Apertura 2018

- C.D. Dragon

Teams relegated to Tercera Division de Fútbol Salvadoreño - Apertura 2018

- UDET
- San Rafael Cedros

Teams promoted from Tercera Division De Fútbol Profesional - Apertura 2018

- C.D. Liberal
- A.D. Santa Rosa Guachipilin

New Teams or teams that purchased a spot in the Segunda division

- UDET (originally relegated but bought the spot of La Asuncion for $12,000)
- Chalatenango (bought the spot of Atletico Comalapa for $TBD)

Teams that failed to register for the Apertura 2018

- El Roble (Team de-registered due to financial trouble)
- La Asuncion (sold their spot to UDET)
- Atlético Comalapa (sold their spot to Chalatenango)

== Stadiums and locations ==
Club	City	Stadium	Capacity
Atletico Apopa	Apopa, San Salvador	Estadio Joaquín Gutiérrez	
Atletico Marte	San Salvador, San Salvador	Estadio	
Aspirante	Jucuapa, Usulután	Estadio Municipal Jucuapa	
Brujos de Izalco	Izalco, Sonsonate	Estadio Salvador Mariona	
Chagüite	Lolotiquillo, Morazán	Estadio Correcaminos	
Chalatenango	Chalatenango, Chalatenango	Complejo deportivo Mario Jovel, en Aguilares	
Dragon	San Miguel, San Miguel	Estadio Juan Francisco Barraza	
El Vencedor	Santa Elena, Usulután	Estadio German Rivas Lozano	
Fuerte San Francisco	San Francisco Gotera, Morazán	Estadio Correcaminos	
Independiente	San Vicente, San Vicente	Estadio Vicentino	
Ilopaneco	Ilopango, San Salvador	Estadio Azteca	
Liberal	Quelepa, San Miguel	Estadio Municipal de Quelepa	
Once Lobos	Chalchuapa, Santa Ana	Estadio Once Lobos	
Platense	Zacatecoluca, La Paz	Estadio Panoramico Antonio Toledo Valle	10,000
Rácing Jr	Armenia, Sonsonate	Estadio 21 de Noviembre	
San Pablo Tacachico	San Pablo Tacachico, La Libertad	Estadio de Valle Mesa	
Santa Rosa Guachipilin	Santa Rosa Guachipilín, Santa Ana	Estadio José Hernández	
Topiltzin	Jiquilisco, Usulután	Estadio Topiltzin	
UDET	El Tránsito, San Miguel	Estadio Cesar Antonio Angulo	
Vendaval	Apopa, San Salvador	Estadio Joaquín Gutiérrez.	

=== Personnel and kits ===
Team	Chairman	Head coach	Captain	Kit manufacturer	Shirt sponsor(s)
Atletico Apopa	(El Salvador) Carlos Turcios	(El Salvador) Marco Antonio Portillo	(El Salvador) TBD	Milan	Nil
Atletico Marte	(El Salvador) Hugo Carrillo	(Argentina) Gabriel Alvarez	(El Salvador) Diego Hunter	Nil	Tony Sports, Sevisal
Aspirante	TBD	(El Salvador) Oscar David Ramirez	(El Salvador) TBD	Nil	Caja de Credito Jucuapa, Aqua Zen, Alcadia Municipal de Jucuapa
Brujos de Izalco	TBD	(Uruguay) Ruben Alonso	(El Salvador) Carlos Rodrigo Martinez Mejia	None	Alfonso Guevara, Gallo Pizza, Alcadia Municipal de Izalco
Chagüite	TBD	(Colombia) Carlos Asprilla	(El Salvador) TBD	Innova Sport	Mariano Blanco, Pereiras, Apalipul, Construtora Benítez, Elmer Ramos
Chalatenango	TBD	(El Salvador) Ricardo Serrano	(El Salvador) TBD	TBD	TBD
Dragon	TBD	(Uruguay) Rubén da Silva	(El Salvador) TBD	Rush	Bufete, Credicampo, Sistema Fedicredito
El Vencedor	(El Salvador) Raul Galo	(El Salvador) Giovanni Trigueros	(El Salvador) Alexis Maravilla	Innova Sport	Astroton, Tipografico Ceren, Roxy
Fuerte San Francisco	TBD	(El Salvador) Marvin Javier Hernández	(El Salvador) TBD	Innova Sport	Caja de Credito de San Francisco Gotera, Gotus, Las Perlitas, Electrolit, Prosergon, Alcadia Municipal Gotera
Independiente	TBD	(El Salvador) Wilson Angulo	(El Salvador) Erasmo Henriquez	PS	TBD
Ilopaneco	(El Salvador) Adán Perdomo	(El Salvador) Guillermo Rivera	(El Salvador) TBD	Galaxia	Emilio Corea, Dandao, la Dinaca, Gold
Liberal	TBD	(El Salvador) Omar Sevilla	(El Salvador) David Hernández	TBD	Alcadia Municipal de Quelepa, Nevada, Hobby, Univo
Once Lobos	TBD	(El Salvador) Cesar Acevedo	(El Salvador) Carlos Portillo	None	Zona Franca 10 Chalchuapa, Alcadia Municipal de Chalchuapa, Fundecredito de R.L.
Platense	(El Salvador) Carlos Rene Burgos Alvarado	(El Salvador) Jorge Abrego	(El Salvador) Edgar Valladares	Nil	Comercial Deras, Caja de Credito Zacatecoluca, Comite Los Angeles, Rosy Romero, D'Kche, central dental rivera Guidos
Rácing Jr	(El Salvador) Douglas Ramirez	(El Salvador) Fausto Omar Vásquez el Bocho	(El Salvador) Luis García	TBD	Alcadia Municipal de Armenia, Caja de Credito Armenia
San Pablo Tacachico	(El Salvador) Mario Alberto Castillo	(El Salvador) Juan Ramón Sánchez	(El Salvador) Ever Bladimir Avila	Galaxia	Pepe, Construction Lingo, Funerales Celesti
Santa Rosa Guachipilin	(El Salvador) Carlos Enrique Calderon	(El Salvador) Samuel Maldonaldo	(El Salvador) Sergio Armando Mendez Arriola	Matute Sport	Omnivision Canal 29, Ferreteria Difersa
Topiltzin	(El Salvador) Herbert Mauricio Zavala	(El Salvador) Manuel Carranza Murillo	(El Salvador) TBD	TBD	TBD
UDET	TBD	(El Salvador) Miguel Aguilar Obando	(El Salvador) Enrique Kikin Quintanilla	Kelme	Ginerra
Vendaval	(El Salvador) Juan Paredes Marín	(Uruguay) Pablo Quiñones	(Colombia) Cristian Gonzalez Grueso	Kelme	TBD

== Notable events ==
=== Teams failure to register ===
Topiltzin, Alacranes 33, Independiente FC and Dragon failed to register for Clausura 2019 season, due to outstanding debt owed to players and staff .

=== Notable death from Apertura 2018 season and 2019 Clausura season ===
The following people associated with the Primera Division have died in end of 2018 and mid 2019.

- Erasmo Henríquez (Independiente captain)
- Jacinto Roque Gutiérrez (ex El Vencedor player)

== Managerial changes ==
Team	Outgoing manager	Manner of departure	Date of vacancy	Replaced by	Date of appointment	Position in table
Pre-Apertura changes
Vendaval	(Chile) Hector Jara	End of contract	May 2018	(El Salvador) Edgar Henríquez	May 2018	Preseason
Topiltzin	(El Salvador) Jorge Abrego	End of contract	May 2018	(El Salvador) Manuel Carranza Murillo	July 2018	Preseason
Independiente	(El Salvador) Ivan Ruiz	End of contract, went on to become assistant manager of Audaz	May 2018	(El Salvador) Wilson Angulo	July 2018	Preseason
Once Lobos	(El Salvador) Jorge Molina	End of contract	May 2018	(El Salvador) Cesar Acevedo	May 2018	Preseason
Platense	(Brazil) Eraldo Correia	End of contract	May 2018	(El Salvador) Jorge Abrego	May 2018	Preseason
Chagüite	(El Salvador) Nelson Ancheta	End of contract, moved to become coach of Jocoro	June 2018	(Colombia) Carlos Asprilla	June 2018	Preseason
Brujos de Izalco	(El Salvador) Juan Ramon Paredes	End of contract, moved to become coach of Sonsonate	June 2018	(Uruguay) Ruben Alonso	June 2018	Preseason
Rácing Jr	(El Salvador) Enzo Artiga	Sacked	June 2018	(El Salvador) Fausto Omar el Bocho Vasquez	June 2018	Preseason
El Vencedor	(El Salvador) Omar Sevilla	End of contract	June 2018	(El Salvador) Giovanni Trigueros	June 2018	Preseason
Liberal	(El Salvador)	End of contract	June 2018	(El Salvador) Omar Sevilla	June 2018	Preseason
Dragon	(El Salvador) Abel Blanco	moved back to assistant manager	June 2018	(Uruguay) Rubén da Silva	June 2018	Preseason
San Pablo Tacachico	(Uruguay) Pablo Quiñones	End of contract	June 2018	(El Salvador) Juan Ramon Sanchez	June 2018	Preseason
Aspirante	(El Salvador) TBD	End of contract	June 2018	(El Salvador) Oscar David Ramirez	July 2018	Preseason
Alacranes 33 Chalatenango	None	New club	June 2018	(El Salvador) Ricardo Serrano	July 2018	Preseason
Vendaval	(El Salvador) Edgar Henríquez	Left his contract	July 2018	(Uruguay) Pablo Quiñones	July 2018	Preseason
Apertura changes
Aspirante	(El Salvador) Oscar David Ramirez	Sacked	September 2018	(El Salvador) José Mario Martínez	September 2018	Group B. 10th
Vendaval	(Uruguay) Pablo Quiñones	Sacked	September 2018	(El Salvador) Bairon Alvarez	September 2018	Group A, 8th
Ilopaneco	(El Salvador) Guillermo Rivera	Sacked	September 2018	(El Salvador) Salvador Vasquez	September 2018	Group A, 10th
Independiente	(El Salvador) Wilson Angulo	Resigned	September 2018	(El Salvador) Ivan Ruiz	September 2018	Group B, 5th
Chagüite	(Colombia) Luis Asprilla	Sacked	September 2018	(El Salvador) Fidel Lazo	September 2018	Group B, 5th
Atletico Marte	(Argentina) Gabriel Alvarez	Sacked	September 2018	(El Salvador) Ricardo Garcia	September 2018	Group B, 5th
C.D. Dragon	(Uruguay) Rubén da Silva	Resigned	October 2018	(El Salvador) Santos Rivera	October 2018	Group B, 5th
Chagüite	(El Salvador) Fidel Lazo	Moved back to assistant manager	October 2018	(El Salvador) Jorge Calles	October 2018	Group B, th
Liberal	(El Salvador) Omar Sevilla	Resigned, became head coach of Municipal Limeno	October 2018	(El Salvador) Ervin Loza	October 2018	Group B, th
Independiente	(El Salvador) Ivan Ruiz	Resigned	November 2018	(El Salvador) Orlando Hernandez Torres	November 2018	Group B, 5th
Pre-Clausura changes
A.D. Santa Rosa Guachipilin	(El Salvador) Samuel Maldonado	End of contract, went on to become assistant manager of Metapan	December 2018	(Argentina) Carlos Martínez Che	December 2018	Preseason
Liberal	(El Salvador) Ervin Loza	End of contract	December 2018	(El Salvador) Salomón Quintanilla	December 2018	Preseason
Topiltzin	(El Salvador) Manuel Carranza Murillo	End of contract	December 2018	(El Salvador) Salomón Montoya	December 2018	Preseason
UDET	(El Salvador) Miguel Aguilar Obando	End of contract	December 2018	(El Salvador) Omar Sevilla	December 2018	Preseason
Chagüite	(El Salvador) Jorge Calles	End of contract	December 2018	(El Salvador) Victor Coreas	2019	Preseason
Vendaval	(El Salvador) Bairon Alvarez	End of contract	2019	(El Salvador) Jorge Calles	January 2019	Preseason
Clausura changes
Ilopaneco	(El Salvador) Salvador Vasquez	Mutual agreement	February 2019	(El Salvador) Victor Manuel Pacheco	2019	th
Liberal	(El Salvador) Salomón Quintanilla	Mutual agreement	February 2019	(El Salvador) Abel Blanco	February 2019	th
El Vencedor	(El Salvador) Giovanni Trigueros	Mutual agreement	February, 2019	(El Salvador) Miguel Aguilar Obando	February, 2019	th
Chagüite	(El Salvador) Victor Coreas	Sacked	February, 2019	(El Salvador) Nelson Ancheta	February, 2019	th
El Vencedor	(El Salvador) Miguel Aguilar Obando	Contract was denied by Segunda division	March, 2019	(El Salvador) Giovanni Trigueros	March, 2019	th
Rácing Jr	(El Salvador) Fausto Omar el Bocho Vasquez	Sacked	March, 2019	(El Salvador) Efren Marenco	March, 2019	th
Vendaval	(El Salvador) Jorge Calles	Sacked	March, 2019	(El Salvador) Osmin Orellana	March, 2019	th

== Apertura 2018 ==
=== Foreign players ===
Club	Foreign Player 1	Foreign Player 2
Atletico Apopa	(Colombia) Hector Valencia	
Atletico Marte	(Argentina) Cristobal Post	(Colombia) Nicolás Claros
Aspirante	(Colombia) Andrés Vallecilla	(Brazil) Luis Felipe Ruis Tapias
Brujos de Izalco	(Colombia) Brian Gil	(Colombia) Cristian Gil
Chagüite	(Honduras) Benjamin Chamorro / (Colombia) Keiner Rentería	(Uruguay) Jonathan Piñeiro
Chalatenango	(Colombia) Fredy Gonzales	(Colombia) Amaranto Sanchez
Dragon	(Colombia) Carlos Urrego	(Brazil) (Honduras) Erick Aziel Hernandez Berrios
El Vencedor	(Colombia) Jhon Machado	(Colombia) Diomer Hineztrosa
Fuerte San Francisco	(Brazil) Josielson Moraes Silva	(Colombia) Yohanny Mancilla Boya
Independiente	(Colombia) Nildeson Gonzales (Brazil) Junior Dos Santos	(Brazil) Igor Dos Santos
Ilopaneco	(Colombia) Christian Camilo Santanna	(Brazil) Eriko
Liberal	(Honduras) Gregory Costly	
Once Lobos	(Colombia) Alexis Mosquera	(Brazil) Evandro dos Santos
Platense	(Colombia) Wilber Arizala	(Colombia) Wilian Guerrero
Rácing Jr	(Brazil) Jackson de Oliveira	
San Pablo Tacachico	(Colombia) Roger Albeiro Rico	(Colombia) Juan Camilo Delgado
Santa Rosa Guachipilin	Nil	Nil
Topiltzin	(Colombia) TBD	
UDET	(Colombia) TBD	
Vendaval	(Colombia) Cristian Gonzalez Grueso	

=== Conference standings ===
==== Group A ====
Pos	Team	Pld	W	D	L	GF	GA	GD	Pts	Qualification
1	Brujos de Izalco	18	9	5	4	30	25	+5	32	Qualified to the Final Round
2	Rácing Jr	18	8	7	3	37	27	+10	31	Qualified to the Final Round
3	San Pablo Tacachico	18	8	6	4	34	24	+10	30	Qualified to the Final Round
4	A.D. Santa Rosa Guachipilin	18	8	5	5	42	36	+6	29	Qualified to the Final Round
5	Once Lobos	18	7	6	5	30	26	+4	27	
6	Vendaval	18	5	7	6	22	24	−2	22	
7	Ilopaneco	18	5	5	8	30	38	−8	20	
8	Atletico Marte	18	5	4	9	27	34	−7	19	
9	Atletico Apopa	18	4	5	9	29	36	−7	17	
10	Alacranes 33	18	4	4	10	21	32	−11	16	

Updated to match(es) played on 2018. Source:
Rules for classification: 1) points; 2) goal difference; 3) number of goals scored.

==== Group B ====
Pos	Team	Pld	W	D	L	GF	GA	GD	Pts	Qualification
1	Platense	18	11	7	0	28	10	+18	40	Qualified to the Final Round
2	El Vencedor	18	11	7	0	27	9	+18	40	Qualified to the Final Round
3	Dragon	18	8	5	5	27	17	+10	29	Qualified to the Final Round
4	Fuerte San Francisco	18	7	4	7	30	31	−1	25	Qualified to the Final Round
5	Liberal	18	5	7	6	32	33	−1	22	
6	Chagüite	18	5	5	8	26	31	−5	20	
7	Independiente	18	4	7	7	19	25	−6	19	
8	Aspirante	18	4	4	10	24	35	−11	16	
9	UDET	18	2	9	7	23	33	−10	15	
10	Topiltzin	18	2	7	9	26	38	−12	13	

Updated to match(es) played on 2018. Source:
Rules for classification: 1) points; 2) goal difference; 3) number of goals scored.

=== Final series ===
==== Quarterfinals ====
November 17, 2018

Fuerte San Francisco	1-1	Brujos de Izalco
Josielson Moraes 12'		Cristian Gil Hurtado 39'

Estadio Correcaminos
November 25, 2018
3:00 pm

Brujos de Izalco	1-2	Fuerte San Francisco
Josielson Moraes; Moisés Chicas	[ ]	TBD 54'

Estadio Salvador Mariona

Fuerte San Francisco won 3-2 on aggregate.

November 18, 2018
3:00 pm

San Pablo Tacachico	0-1	El Vencedor
Nil		John Machado 60'

Cancha Municipal Valle Meza
November 25, 2018
3:00 pm

El Vencedor	3-2	San Pablo Tacachico
Diomer Hinestroza 32'; Elmer Araniva 73'; Ronald Padilla 89'	[ ]	28'; Jonathan Palma 65'

Estadio German Rivas Lozano

El Vencedor won 4-2 on aggregate.

November 18, 2018
3:00pm

Dragón	2-3	Rácing Jr
Derek Sánchez 40'; Arsenio Rodríguez 75'		Aquiles Méndez 27'; Jackson de Oliveira 47'; Luis Najarro 58'

Estadio Juan Francisco Barraza
November 24, 2018
3:00 pm

Rácing Jr	4-2 (a.e.t.)	Dragón
Jorge Arévalo 37'; David Gómez 96' 115'; Elíseo Fernández 120'		Carlos Orrego 17'; Arsenio Rodríguez 88'

Estadio “21 de Noviembre” de Armenia

Rácing Jr won 7-4 on aggregate.

November 18, 2018
3:00 pm

Santa Rosa Guachipilin	3-2	Platense
Ricardo Ulloa 10'; Óscar Ulloa 38'; Salvador Salguero 63'		Edgar Valladares 75'; José Amaya 87'

Estadio
November 25, 2018
3:30 pm

Platense	3-1	Santa Rosa Guachipilin
William Guerrero 43'; Rosemberg Cueva 62'; Wilber Novoa 65'		TBD 11'

Estadio Antonio Toledo Valle

Platense won 5-4 on aggregate.

==== Semifinals ====
December 2, 2018
3:00pm

Fuerte San Francisco	1-2	El Vencedor
Josielson Moraes 85'		Diomer Hinestroza 27' 43'

Estadio Correcaminos, San Francisco Gotera
December 2, 2018
3:00pm

Rácing Jr	2-1	Platense
Jackson de Oliveira 3'; David Gómez 88'		Rosemberg Cueva 61'

Estadio 21 de Noviembre, Armenia, Sonsonate

December 9, 2018
3:00pm

El Vencedor	2-0	Fuerte San Francisco
Jhon Machado 69' 72'		Nil

Estadio German Rivas, Usulután.

El Vencedor won 4-1 on aggregate.

December 9, 2018

Platense	2-0	Rácing Jr
Edgar Valladares 11'; William Guerrero 56'		Nil

Estadio Antonio Toledo Valle, Zacatecoluca

Platense won 4-3 on aggregate.

==== Final ====
===== First leg =====
16 December 2018
1:55

Platense	1-0	El Vencedor
Cristian Merino 38'		Nil

Estadio Antonio Toledo Valle
Referee: German Stanely Martinez

===== Second leg =====
24 December 2018
3:00

El Vencedor	1-0	Platense
Jhon Machado 64'		Nil

Estadio German Lorenzo Rivas
Attendance: 2,000

1-1, El Vencedor won 4-2 on penalties.

Apertura 2018 champions

1st title

== Clausura 2019 ==
=== Conference standings ===
==== Group A ====
Pos	Team	Pld	W	D	L	GF	GA	GD	Pts	Qualification
1	Atletico Marte	14	9	1	4	30	17	+13	28	Qualified to the Final Round
2	San Pablo	14	8	4	2	32	23	+9	28	Qualified to the Final Round
3	Brujos de Izalco	14	7	3	4	34	19	+15	24	Qualified to the Final Round
4	Racing Jr	14	7	1	6	20	19	+1	22	Qualified to the Final Round
5	Vendaval	13	5	2	6	19	22	−3	17	
6	Ilopaneco	13	4	3	6	17	24	−7	15	
7	Santa Rosa Guachipilin	13	3	4	6	26	30	−4	13	
8	Once Lobos	13	2	4	7	14	36	−22	10	

Updated to match(es) played on 2018. Source:
Rules for classification: 1) points; 2) goal difference; 3) number of goals scored.

==== Group B ====
Pos	Team	Pld	W	D	L	GF	GA	GD	Pts	Qualification
1	Aspirante	14	8	4	2	23	12	+11	28	Qualified to the Final Round
2	Platense	14	6	7	1	19	7	+12	25	Qualified to the Final Round
3	Fuerte San Francisco	14	6	5	3	12	10	+2	23	Qualified to the Final Round
4	El Vencedor	14	5	6	3	17	14	+3	21	Qualified to the Final Round
5	Chaguite	14	4	7	3	27	20	+7	19	
6	Atletico Apopa	14	2	5	7	11	20	−9	11	
7	Liberal	14	1	6	7	16	19	−3	9	
8	UDET	14	1	6	7	11	29	−18	9	

Updated to match(es) played on 2018. Source:
Rules for classification: 1) points; 2) goal difference; 3) number of goals scored.

=== Foreign players ===
Club	Foreign Player 1	Foreign Player 2
Atletico Apopa	(Colombia) Hector Valencia	
Atletico Marte	(Argentina) Matías Coloca	(Colombia) Johalim Palacios
Aspirante	(Colombia) Daymer Cañate	(Colombia) Andres Vallecilla
Brujos de Izalco	(Colombia) Luis Palacios	(Colombia) Brian Gil
Chagüite	(Colombia) TBD	
Chalatenango	De-Registered	De-Registered
Dragon	De-Registered	De-Registered
El Vencedor	(Colombia) Diomer Hineztrosa	(Colombia) Jhon Machado
Fuerte San Francisco	(Honduras) Gustavo Gómez Funes	(Brazil) Josielson Moraes Silva
Independiente	De-Registered	De-Registered
Ilopaneco	(Colombia) Christian Camilo Santanna	
Liberal	(Brazil) Philipinho Pedorrinho	(Brazil) Igor Dos Santos Da Silva
Once Lobos	(Colombia) Alexis Mosquera	(Colombia) Alexander Tejada Molano
Platense	(Colombia) Wilber Arizala	
Rácing Jr	(Colombia) TBD	
San Pablo Tacachico	(Colombia) Juan Camilo Delgado	
Santa Rosa Guachipilin	(Colombia) Yohalin Placios	(Colombia) Amaranto Sanchez Mosquera
Topiltzin	De-Registered	De-Registered
UDET	(Colombia) TBD	
Vendaval	(Colombia) Camilo Rivas	(Colombia) Teodulo Bonilla / (Panama) Victor Barrera

=== Final series ===
==== Quarterfinals ====
May 5, 2019
10:30 am

El Vencedor	4-0	Atletico Marte
Jhon Machado 35'; Rusvel Saravia 57' 70'; Arsenio Rodriguez 78'		None

Estadio German Rivas Lozano. Santa Elena
May 22, 2019
3:00 pm

Atletico Marte	1-2	El Vencedor
Luis Canales 54'	[ ]	Arsenio Rodríguez 76'; Ever Rodriguez 82'

Estadio Cuscatlan

El Vencedor won 6-1 on aggregate.

May 4, 2019
3:00 pm

Fuerte San Francisco	1-0	San Pablo
Elvis Claros 70'		Nil

Estadio Correcaminos
May 13, 2019
3:00 pm

San Pablo	6-3	Fuerte San Francisco
Camilo Delgado 2' 10' 97'; Irvin Valdés 45'; Isaí Aguilar; Rodrigo Herrera 119'	[ ]	Bryan Zúniga; Francisco Carballo

Estadio

San Pablo won 6-4 on aggregate.

May 22, 2019
3:00pm

Racing Jr	4-1 (results changed to 0-2 as Racing coach was not registered)	Aspirante
Eliseo Fernández 45' 62' 85' 90'		47'

Estadio
May 16, 2019
3:00 pm

Aspirante	2-1	Racing Jr
Andrés Vallecillas 54'; Rommel Mejía 75'		Moisés Carranza 70'

Estadio

Aspirantes won 4-1 on aggregate.

May 5, 2019
3:00 pm

Brujos de Izalco	1-3	Platense
Bryan Gil 10'		Tony Maravilla 6'; José Amaya 47'; Mario Martínez. 77'

Estadio Salvador Mariona, de Izalco.
May 13, 2019
3:30 pm

Platense	4-0	Brujos de Izalco
Wilber Novoa 19'; Edgar Valladares 22'; William Guerrero 44'; Nelson Alfaro 88'		None

Polideportivo de Tecoluca

Platense won 7-1 on aggregate.

==== Semifinals ====
May 20, 2019
3:00pm

El Vencedor	1-1	Platense
Alexis Maravilla 91'		Rosemberg Cuevas 33'

Estadio
May 26, 2019
3:00pm

Platense	3-1	El Vencedor
Aristides Mendoza 7'; Manuel Otero 70'; Óscar Marroquín 86'		Jhon Machado 30'

Polideportivo de Tecoluca

Platense won 4-2 on aggregate.

May 20, 2019
3:00pm

San Pablo	5-1	Aspirante
Rodrigo Herrera 7'; Camilo Delgado 13' 48'; Irvin Valdés 32' 40'		Rommel Mejía 92'

Estadio
May 26, 2019

Aspirante	1-0	San Pablo
Romel Mejía 88'		None

Complejo

San Pablo won 5-2 on aggregate.

==== Final ====
===== First leg =====
June 3, 2019

San Pablo	1-0	Platense
Ricardo Herrera 75'		Nil

Cancha Municipal Valle Meza
Attendance: 2,415

===== Second leg =====
June 9, 2019

Platense	3-2	San Pablo
Edgar Valladares 47' 54'; Levi Martínez 78'		Camilo Guardado 59'; Irving Valdez 38'

Polideportivo Tecoluca, San Vicente
Attendance: 4,288
Referee: TBD

3-3, San Pablo won 4-1 on penalties.

Clausura champions

1st title

=== Individual awards ===
Hombre GOL	Best Goalkeeper Award
(Colombia) Bryan Gil; Brujos	(El Salvador) German Martinez; Platense
