= List of Chalatenango managers =

C.D. Chalatenango has had many coaches in its history.

The majority of coaches Chalatenango have had have been Salvadorians. Of the coaches to have managed Chalatenango, TBD have been Salvadorians and TBD foreigners. In some cases, the Salvadorian coaches have been former players of the club that agreed to take charge after the sacking of the regular coach that season.

The main nationalities of the coaches of Chalatenango barring Salvadorians; have been Argentina (2 coaches) and Uruguayan (2). The club has also had a Serbian, a Guatemalan and a Honduran.

== C.D. Chalatenango's coaches ==
Information correct as of match played March 3, 2017. Only competitive matches are counted.

Name	Nationality	From	To	Honours
Oscar Rene Serrano	El Salvador	1960s	TBD	
Ricardo Tomasino	El Salvador	1970s	TBD	
Orlando Cotto	El Salvador	1970s	TBD	
Isaías Choto	El Salvador	1970s	TBD	
Mauricio "Pipo" Rodríguez	El Salvador	1980	1980	
Ricardo Tomasino	El Salvador	1981	1981	
Conrado Miranda	El Salvador	1982	1982	
Raúl Magaña	El Salvador	1984	1985	
Raúl Magaña	El Salvador	1988	TBD	
Guillermo "Loro" Castro	El Salvador	1980s	TBD	
Armando Contreras Palma	El Salvador	1986	1987	
Armando Contreras Palma	El Salvador	1990	1991	
Raúl Magaña	El Salvador	1998	TBD	
Jose Ramon Aviles	El Salvador	TBD	TBD	
Luis Angel León	El Salvador	2001	2002	
Raúl Héctor Cocherari	Argentina	2003	2003	Segunda Division 2003 campeon
Luis Roberto Hernández	El Salvador	August 2003	September 2003	
Juan Quarterone	Argentina	October 2003	December 2003	
Raúl Héctor Cocherari	Argentina	December 2003	April 2004	
Kelvyn de Jesus Hernandez	El Salvador	2004	2004	
Carlos Alberto Mijangos	Guatemala	2004	September 2005	
Agustín Castillo	Peru	September 2005	March 2007	
Vladan Vićević	Serbia El Salvador	April 2007	February 2008	
Juan Ramón Sánchez	El Salvador	March 2008	June 2008	
Carlos Antonio Meléndez	El Salvador	July 2008	2009	
Milton "El Tigana" Meléndez	El Salvador	2009	2009	
Alexsander Rodriguez	El Salvador	2010	2010	
Ricardo Serrano	El Salvador	2011	2011	
Marcos Portillo	El Salvador	2012	2012	
German Pérez	Honduras	2013	March 2014	Torneo Clausura 2013 de la Tercera División Profesional
Angel Orellana	El Salvador	March 2014	December 2014	
Ricardo Serrano	El Salvador	January 2015	June 2015	
Juan Andrés Sarulyte	Argentina	June 2015	August 2015	
Ricardo Serrano	El Salvador	August 2015	December 2015	
Nelson Mauricio Ancheta	El Salvador	December 2015	January 2016	
Ricardo Serrano	El Salvador	January 2016	May 2016	
Ruben Alonso	Uruguay	June 2016	October 2016	
Geovanni Portillo	El Salvador	October 2016	December 2016	
Carlos Alberto Mijangos	Guatemala	December 2016	February 2017	
William Renderos Iraheta	El Salvador	February 2017	March 2017	
Carlos Alberto Mijangos	Guatemala	March 2017	May 2017	

== A.D. Chalatenango's coaches ==
Information correct as of match played January 2024, 2024. Only competitive matches are counted.

Name	Nationality	From	To	Honours
Ricardo Serrano	El Salvador	May 2017	September 2017	
William Renderos Iraheta	El Salvador	September 2017	February 2018	
Geovanni Portillo (Interim)	El Salvador	February 2018	June 2018	
Angel Piazzi	Argentina	June 2018	October 2018	
Geovanni Portillo (Interim)	El Salvador	October 2018	October 2018	
Álvaro Misael Alfaro	El Salvador	October 2018	May 2019	
Juan Ramón Sánchez	El Salvador	July 2019	December 2020	
Ricardo Serrano (Interim)	El Salvador	December 2020	December 2020	
Ricardo Montoya	Costa Rica	December 2020	September 15, 2021	
Erick Dowson Prado	El Salvador	September 17, 2021	June 2022	
Edgar Henriquez	El Salvador	June 2022	December 31, 2022	
Ricardo Serrano	El Salvador	January 2023	May 2023	
Hiatus	El Salvador	July 2023	(Present)	
