= 2021–22 Segunda División de Fútbol Salvadoreño =

Segunda División de Fútbol Salvadoreño
- Season: 2021-22
- Champions: Apertura: Municipal FC, Clausura: Dragon
- Promoted: TBD
- Relegated: El Vencedor and AD Santa Rosa
- Matches: 56
- Goals: 129 (2.3 per match)
- Top goalscorer: Apertura 2021: Raul Quijada (15 goals); Clausura 2022: Jhony Moran (17 goals)
- Biggest home win: Apertura 2021: San Pablo Municipal 7–0 Once Lobos (1 August 2021); Clausura 2022: Cacahuatique 8–0 El Vencedor (3 April 2022)
- Biggest away win: Apertura 2021: TBD 0–3 TBD (19 August 2021)
- Highest scoring: Apertura 2021: Dragon 7-3 C.D. Gerardo Barrios (26 September 2021)
- Longest winning run: Apertura 2021: 4 matches TBD
- Longest unbeaten run: Apertura 2021: 7 matches TBD
- Longest winless run: Apertura 2021: 7 matches TBD
- Longest losing run: Apertura 2021: 4 matches TBD
- Highest attendance: Apertura 2021: 3,465; TBD 3–0 TBD (1 August 2021)
- Lowest attendance: Apertura 2021: 189; TBD vs TBD (19 August 2021)
- Total attendance: Apertura 2021: TBD
- Average attendance: Apertura 2021: TBD
- Stats are from the regular season only

The 2021–22 season (officially known as Liga de Plata and also as Torneo Luis Baltazar Ramírez) will be El Salvador's Segunda División de Fútbol Salvadoreño. The season will be split into two championships Apertura 2021 and Clausura 2022. The champions of the Apertura and Clausura play the direct promotion playoff every year. The winner of that series ascends to Primera División de Fútbol de El Salvador.

== Changes to the 2021–22 seasons ==
Teams promoted to 2021–22 Primera División de El Salvador

- Platense

Teams relegated to Segunda División de Fútbol Salvadoreño - Apertura 2021

- Atlético Sonsonate (Originally C.D. Sonsonate were relegated, however the club disbanded due to non payments).

Teams relegated to Tercera Division de Fútbol Salvadoreño - Apertura 2021

- None

Teams promoted from Tercera Division De Fútbol Profesional - Apertura 2021

- Inter San Salvador
- Corinto FC

New Teams or teams that purchased a spot in the Segunda division

- Ilopango FC (Purchased spot of C.D. Liberal)
- Atletico Sonsonate (Purchased spot of Ilopaneco)
- Once Lobos (Returned after a hiatus)
- Racing Jnr (Returned after a hiatus)
- Topiltzin (Returned after a hiatus)
- Gerardo Barrios (Returned after a hiatus)
- El Vencedor (Returned after a hiatus)

Teams that failed to register for the Apertura 2021

- C.D. Liberal (Sold spot to Ilopango FC)
- Ilopaneco (Sold spot to Atletico Sonsonate)

== Notable events ==
=== Change of name and ownership ===
On July 11, 2021 after gaining promotion to the segunda división the team Inter Salvador Silvar changed ownership and the club was relocated to Santa Tecla, the club rebranded itself as Inter Tecla.

=== New team ===
After the Apertura 2021 season, Real Atletico Sonsonate sold their spot to Fenix F.C. who were previously playing in ADFAS Sonsonate, equivalent to the fourth division.

== Managerial changes ==
Team	Outgoing manager	Manner of departure	Date of vacancy	Replaced by	Date of appointment	Position in table
Pre-Apertura changes
CD Vendaval	(El Salvador) Angel Hernandez	Resigned	May 2021	(El Salvador) Luis Landos	June 2021	Preseason
El Vencedor	(El Salvador) None	On hiatus	2021	(El Salvador) Ricardo Funes	June 2021	Preseason
Fuerte San Francisco	(El Salvador) Omar Sevilla	Mutual Consent	June 2021	(El Salvador) Marvin Garcia	June 2021	Preseason
Cacahuatique	(Colombia) Efrain Solano	Mutual Consent	2021	(El Salvador) Omar Sevilla	June 2021	Preseason
Once Lobos	(El Salvador) None	On hiatus	2021	(Argentina) Carlos Che Martinez	June 2021	Preseason
AD Santa Rosa Guachipilín	(El Salvador) TBD	Mutual Consent	2021	(El Salvador) petro Portillo	June 2021	Preseason
Atletico Sonsonate	(El Salvador) None	New club	2021	(El Salvador) Angel Orellana	July 2021	Preseason
AD Destroyer	(El Salvador) Juan Ramon Paredes	Mutual Consent	June 2021	(El Salvador) Jorge Abrego	June 2021	Preseason
Marte Soyapango	(El Salvador) Edson Flores	Resigned	July 2021	(El Salvador) Mauricio Alfaro	July 2021	Preseason
CD Vendaval	(El Salvador) Luis Landos	Resigned	July 2021	(El Salvador) Ramirez Moisa	July 2021	Preseason
Inter Tecla	(El Salvador) William Renderos Iraheta	Mutual Consent	July 2021	(El Salvador) Juan Ramón Sánchez	July 2021	Preseason
Aspirante	(Argentina) Carlos Che Martinez	Mutual Consent	June 2021	(El Salvador) Samael Virgil	August 2021	Preseason
Apertura changes
El Vencedor	(El Salvador) Ricardo Funes	Mutual Consent	August 2021	(Uruguay) Ruben Alonso	August 2021	Group th
C.D. Dragon	(El Salvador) Jose Mario Martinez	Sacked	September 9, 2021	(El Salvador) Oswaldo Franco (Interim)	September 2021	Group Centro Oriente 9th
CD Vendaval	(El Salvador) Ramirez Moisa	Sacked	September 11, 2021	(El Salvador) Jorge Calles	September 15, 2021	Group Centro Occidente, 10th
AD Santa Rosa Guachipilín	(El Salvador)	Sacked	September, 2021	(El Salvador) Marvin Linares	September, 2021	Group Centro, th
Fuerte San Francisco	(El Salvador) Marvin García	Sacked	September 21, 2021	(El Salvador) Luis Ramírez Zapata	September 22, 2021	Group Centro Occidente, 10th
Topiltzin	(El Salvador) Geovanni Trigueros	Resigned to be Municipal Limeño	September 11, 2021	(El Salvador) Sebastian Hernandez	September 15, 2021	Group Centro Occidente, 10th
CD Gerardo Barrios	(El Salvador) Ervin Soza	Sacked	September 30, 2021	(El Salvador) Miguel Aguilar Obando	September 30, 2021	Group Centro Occidente, 10th
Inter Sivar	(El Salvador) Juan Ramon Sanchez	Sacked	November, 2021	(El Salvador) Juan Carlos Melgar “Interim”	November, 2021	Group Centro Occidente, 10th
AD Destroyer	(El Salvador) Jorge Abrego	Sacked	November 17, 2021	(El Salvador) Juan Ramon Paredes	November 18, 2021	Group Centro Occidente, 1st
Pre-Clausura changes
Fuerte San Francisco	(El Salvador) Marvin Garcia	End of contract	November 24, 2021	(Uruguay) Pablo Quinonez	December 2021	Preseason
Aspirante	(El Salvador) Samuel Vigil	End of contract	2022	(El Salvador) Geovanni Trigueros	December 2021	Preseason
C.D. Titan	(El Salvador) Edgar Batres	End of contract	11 December 2022	(El Salvador) Jorge Abrego	2022	Preseason
CD Gerardo Barrios	(El Salvador) Miguel Aguilar Obando	End of contract	December 2021	(El Salvador) Sergio Ivan Munoz	December 15, 2021	Preseason
Atletico Sonsonate	(El Salvador) Angel Orellana	End of contract	December 14, 2021	(El Salvador) William Lopez	2022	Preseason
Rácing Jr	(El Salvador) Jaime Medina	End of contract	December 2021	(El Salvador) Angel Orellana	29 December 2021	Preseason
C.D. Dragon	(El Salvador) Oswaldo Franco	End of interimship, returns to being assistant coach	December 2021	(El Salvador) Marvin Benitez	January 2022	Preseason
Municipal FC	(El Salvador) Ennio Mendoza	Mutual Consent	January 2022	(El Salvador) Marvin Zepeda	January 2022	Preseason
CD Gerardo Barrios	(El Salvador) Sergio Ivan Munoz	End of contract	January 2022	(Brazil) Eraldo Correira	January, 2022	Preseason
Clausura changes
CD Gerardo Barrios	(Brazil) Eraldo Correira	Mutual Consent	February 2022	(Honduras) Efrain Nunez	February 17, 2022	1st
Municipal FC	(El Salvador) Marvin Zepeda	Sacked	February 2022	(El Salvador) Edgar Batres	February 2022	1st
El Vencedor	(Uruguay) Ruben Alonso	Mutual Consent	February 2022	(El Salvador) Erasmo Lazo El Raton	February 2022	1st
Once Lobos	(Argentina) Carlos Che Martinez	Sacked	March 2022	(El Salvador) Enzo Henriquez	March 2022	8th
Aspirante	(El Salvador) Geovanni Trigueros	Mutual consent, Moved to be assistant coach LA Firpo	April 2022	(Argentina) Carlos Che Martinez	April 2022	1st

== Apertura ==
=== Teams ===
Only 20 teams chose to participate in this season Competition

Team	City	Stadium	Head coach	Captain	Foreign Players
Atletico Sonsonate	Sonsonate	Estadio Municipal de Quelapa	(El Salvador) Angel Orellana *	(El Salvador) N/A	(Honduras) Gregory Costly (Colombia) Ronald Benavides
Aspirante	Jucuapa	Estadio Municipal de Jucuapa	(El Salvador) Samael Vigil	(El Salvador) Williams Reyes	(Colombia) Jefferson Viveros
AD Destroyer	Puerto de La Libertad	Cancha Chilama	(El Salvador) Jorge Abrego *	(El Salvador) Rosemberg Cueva	(Colombia) Mayer Gil (Uruguay) Brayan Obregón
Cacahuatique	Ciudad Barrios, San Miguel	Complejo Deportivo Chapeltique	(El Salvador) Omar Sevilla *	(El Salvador) N/A	(Colombia) Luis Aroleda Murillo (Colombia) Luis Palacios *
Corinto FC	Corinto, Morazan	Estadio Municipal Corinto	(El Salvador) Rolando Perez	(El Salvador) N/A	
Dragón	San Miguel	Estadio Jose Eliseo Reyes	(El Salvador) Jose Mario Martínez	(El Salvador) Geovany Ulloa	(Argentina) Maxi Morales
El Vencedor		Estadio	(El Salvador) Ricardo Funes	(El Salvador) Javier Hernandez	(Colombia) Diomer Hinestroza
Fuerte San Francisco	San Francisco Gotera, Morazan	Estadio Joe Amilcar Moreno	(El Salvador) Marvin Garcia	(El Salvador) N/A	
CD Gerardo Barrios		Cancha Municipal de San Rafael Oriente	(El Salvador) Ervin Soza	(El Salvador) N/A	(Colombia) Fary Mancilla (Brazil) Josielson Moraes
Ilopango FC	TBD	Estadio Joaquin Gutierrez Apopa	(El Salvador) Fredy Santos	(El Salvador) N/A	(Colombia) Camilo Gomez (Colombia) Bryan Zuluga
Inter San Salvador	Santa Tecla	Estadio las Delicias	(El Salvador) Juan Ramón Sánchez	(El Salvador) N/A	(Colombia) Daley Mena
Municipal FC		Estadio Jose Milan Morales	(El Salvador) Enio Mendoza	(El Salvador) Eder Polanco	(Colombia) Hector Lemus (Colombia) Carlos Salazar
Marte Soyapango	Soyapango	Cancha Jorgito Melendez	(El Salvador) Mauricio Alfaro	(El Salvador) Erick Molina	(Colombia) Jhony Moran Chan (Colombia) Argenis Alba
Once Lobos	Santa Ana	Estadio	(Argentina) Carlos Che Martinez *	(El Salvador) N/A	(Colombia) Juan Camilo Delgado (Colombia) Duban Andrade
Rácing Jr	Armenia	Estadio 21 de Noviembre Armenia	(El Salvador) Jaime Medina *	(El Salvador) Freddy Portillo	(Brazil) Jadyr Da Sliva Santos
San Pablo Municipal	San Pabo Tacahico	Cancha Municipal Valle Meza	(El Salvador) Rafael Mariona *	(El Salvador) Felix Sanchez	(Colombia) Bryan Obregon (Colombia) Jeison Quinones
AD Santa Rosa Guachipilín	Santa Rosa Guachipilín, Santa Ana	Estadio Jose Hernandez	(El Salvador) Alfredo Portillo *	(El Salvador) Denis Monterrosa	(Colombia) Juna Chann (Colombia) Yeferson Palacios
Titan	Texistepeque, Santa Ana	Estadio Titan	(El Salvador) Edgar Batres *	(El Salvador) Bryan Ortega	(Colombia) Roger Guerrero (Argentina) Jonathan Cerrutti *
C.D. Topiltzín	Jisquilisco	Estadio Topiltzin de Jiquilisco	(El Salvador) Geovani Trigueros	(El Salvador) Ever Corto	(Colombia) William Guerrero (Colombia) Jose Miguel Medrano
Vendaval	Apopa	Estadio Joaquin Gutierrez	(El Salvador) Ramirez Moisa	(El Salvador) Alan Gonzalez	(Colombia) Boris Polo (Colombia) Alvaro Moreno

=== Regular seasons ===
==== Group Centro Occidente ====
Pos	Team	Pld	W	D	L	GF	GA	GD	Pts	Qualification or relegation
1	Real Destroyer	18	11	4	3	40	26	+14	37	Advance to Playoffs
2	San Pablo Tacachico	18	7	7	4	34	29	+5	28	Advance to Playoffs
3	Municipal F.C.	18	7	6	5	40	30	+10	27	Advance to Playoffs
4	Inter Silvar	18	7	6	5	32	35	−3	27	Advance to Playoffs
5	Titan	18	6	7	5	34	27	+7	25	
6	Racing Jnr	18	6	7	5	27	27	0	25	
7	Real Atletico Sonsonate	18	6	5	7	30	35	−5	23	
8	Vendaval	18	6	2	10	35	40	−5	20	
9	A.D. Santa Rosa	18	4	4	10	36	46	−10	16	
10	Once Lobos	18	2	8	8	24	37	−13	14	

Rules for classification: 1) points; 2) goal difference; 3) number of goals scored.

==== Centro-Oriente ====
Pos	Team	Pld	W	D	L	GF	GA	GD	Pts	Qualification or relegation
1	Cacahuatique	18	11	5	2	39	22	+17	38	Advance to Playoffs
2	Marte Soyapango	18	8	6	4	25	20	+5	30	Advance to Playoffs
3	Corinto	18	7	8	3	28	18	+10	29	Advance to Playoffs
4	Topiltzin	18	7	6	5	25	22	+3	27	Advance to Playoffs
5	Aspirante	18	7	5	6	25	19	+6	26	
6	Dragon	18	6	3	9	30	32	−2	21	
7	Fuerte San Francisco	18	5	6	7	18	21	−3	21	
8	Ilopango	18	5	4	9	22	27	−5	19	
9	El Vencedor	18	4	5	9	22	37	−15	17	
10	Gerardo Barrios	18	3	6	9	28	44	−16	15	

Rules for classification: 1) points; 2) goal difference; 3) number of goals scored.

==== Grupo A ====
Rank	Player	Club	Goals
1	(El Salvador) Raul Quijada	AD Santa Rosa Guachipilín	15
2	(Colombia) Carlos Salazar	Municipal	12
3	(El Salvador) Eduardo Aldair Merino	Vendaval	13
4	(El Salvador) Reynaldo Carpio	AD Destroyer	10
5	(El Salvador) Eder Polanco	Municipal	9

==== Grupo B ====
Rank	Player	Club	Goals
1	(El Salvador) Levi Martinez	Ilopago	13
2	(El Salvador) Javier Ferman	Dragon	12
3	(El Salvador) Rusvel Saravia	Gerardo	12
4	(El Salvador) Gerson Sanchez	Marte Soyapango	10
5	(El Salvador) Elias Gumero	Topiltzin	9

== Finals ==
=== Quarter finals ===
==== First leg ====
November 27, 2021
15:00

Inter Sivar	0-0	A.D. Destroyer
nil		nil

Estadio Las Delicias, Santa Tecla
Referee: Francisco Ernesto Calderon

November 27, 2021
15:00

Corinto FC	1-1	Marte Soyapango
Pedro Escobar		Argenis Alba

Estadio Gilberto Sorto
Referee: Miriam Patricia Leon

November 28, 2021
15:00

C.D. Topiltzin	0-1	Cacahuatique
nil		Cristian Portillo

Estadio Topiltzin
Referee: Sandra Lilian Benitez

November 28, 2021
15:00

Municipal FC	2-0	San Pablo Municipal
Carlos Salazar; Hector Lemus		nil

Estadio Jose Morales
Referee: Franklin Niguel Granados

==== Second leg ====
December 5, 2021

A.D. Destroyer	1-1	Inter Sivar
Cristian Martínez 30'		Julio Borjas 23'

Inter Sivar tied 3–3 on Aggregate, won 4-3 penalties.

December 5, 2021

San Pablo Municipal	1-1	Municipal FC
Brayan Erazo		Carlos Salazar

Municipal FC won 3–1 on Aggregate

5 December 2021

Cacahuatique	2-0	C.D. Topiltzin
Argueta Camililo (pen.); Axel Lopez 68'		‘’’Nil‘’’

Estadio Sergio Torrez, Usulutan

Cacahuatique won 3–0 on Aggregate.

December 5, 2021

Marte Soyapango	2-1	Corinto FC
Francisco Valladares; Juan Carlos Argueta		Francisco Valladares

Marte Soyapango won 3–1 on Aggregate.

=== Semi finals ===
==== First leg ====
December 12, 2021
17:00

Inter Sivar	2-3	Municipal FC
Saul Cabrera 33'; Jairo Martinez 41'		David Gomez 18' 28'; Hector Lemus 48'

Estadio, Santa Tecla

December 13, 2021
15:30

Marte Soyapango	0-0	Cacahuatique
nil		nil

Estadio Espana, Soyapango, San Salvador

==== Second leg ====
December 19, 2021
14:30

Municipal FC	2-1	Inter Sivar
Hector Lemus 78' 93'		TBD 23'

Estadio Municipal de Juayua "Jose Milan Morales", Sonsonate

Municipal FC won 5–3 on Aggregate.

December 19, 2021

Cacahuatique	1-0	Marte Soyapango
Argueta Camilio 15'		Nil

Centro Ecologico El Amaton, Ciduad Barrios, San Migiel

Cacahuatique won 1–0 on Aggregate

=== Grand final ===
December 26, 2021
14:30pm

Municipal FC	4-2	Cacahuatique
David Gomes 3'; Carlos Salazar 15' 38'; Hector Lemus 94'		Jose Luis Rodriguez 7'; Enrique Rivas 44'

Estadio Antonio Valle, Zacatecoluca, La Paz

Municipal FC
GK	(El Salvador) Ismael Valladares
DF	(El Salvador) Jose Vega
DF	(El Salvador) Ulises Miron
DF	(El Salvador) Noe Capacho
DF	(El Salvador) Miguel Perez
MF	(El Salvador) Cesar Aguilar	Substituted off
MF	(El Salvador) Marlon Colocho
MF	(El Salvador) Davod Gomez	Substituted off
MF	(Colombia) Carlos Salazar
FW	(Colombia) Hector Lemus
FW	(El Salvador) Eder Polanco	Substituted off
Substitutes:
FW	(El Salvador) TBD	Substituted on
MF	(El Salvador) TBD	Substituted on
MF	(El Salvador) TBD	Substituted on
Manager:
(El Salvador) Ennio Mendoza

Cacahuatique:
GK	(El Salvador) Jonathan Funes
DF	(El Salvador) Cristian Portillo
DF	(El Salvador) Aldair Reyes
DF	(El Salvador) Eldin Aparicio
DF	(El Salvador) Jose Hernandez
DF	(El Salvador) Jordy Bonilla (substituted off)
MF	(Colombia) Luis Arboleda
MF	(El Salvador) Rene Granados
MF	(El Salvador) Jose Luis Rodriguez
FW	(Colombia) Juan Carlos Argueta
FW	(El Salvador) Enrique Rivaz	Substituted off
Substitutes:
FW	(El Salvador) TBD	Substituted on
FW	(El Salvador) TBD	Substituted on
Manager:
(El Salvador) Omar Sevilla

Apertura 2021 champions

1st title

=== Individual awards ===
Hombre GOL	Best Goalkeeper Award
(El Salvador) Raul Quijada; A.D. Santa Rosa	(El Salvador) Daniel Guiterrez; Aspirante

== Clausura ==
=== Teams ===
Only 20 teams chose to Participate in this season Competition

Team	City	Stadium	Head coach	Captain	Foreign Players
C.D. Aspirante	Jucuapa	Estadio Municipal de Jucuapa	(El Salvador) Geovanni Trigueros *	(El Salvador)	(Colombia) Yoan Ballesteros * (Colombia) Diomer Hinestroza *
AD Destroyer	Puerto de La Libertad	Cancha Chilama	(El Salvador) Rodolfo Gochez *	(El Salvador) Rosemberg Cueva	(Colombia) Cristian Caicedo (Argentina) Matias Coloca *
Cacahuatique	Ciudad Barrios, San Miguel	Complejo Deportivo Chapeltique	(El Salvador) Omar Sevilla *	(El Salvador) Cristian Portillo *	(Colombia) Luis Aroleda Murillo * (Colombia) Luis Palacios *
Corinto FC	Corinto, Morazan	Estadio Municipal Corinto	(El Salvador) Rolando Perez	(El Salvador) N/A	(Colombia) Dandy Choles El Tigre *
Dragón	San Miguel	Estadio Jose Eliseo Reyes	(El Salvador) Marvin Benitez *	(El Salvador) Geovany Ulloa	(Colombia) Manuel Murillo * (Colombia) Kevin Moreno *
El Vencedor		Estadio	(El Salvador) Ricardo Funes	(El Salvador) Javier Hernandez	(Honduras) Gregory Costly
Fenix FC/ Real Atletico Sonsonate	Sonsonate	Estadio Municipal de Quelapa	(El Salvador) William Lopez *	(El Salvador) N/A	(Colombia) Wilson Palacios Hurtado * (Colombia) Ronald Benavides*
Fuerte San Francisco	San Francisco Gotera, Morazan	Estadio Joe Amilcar Moreno	(Uruguay) Pablo Quinonez *	(El Salvador) N/A	(Colombia) Steven Riasco * (Uruguay) Cristian Maciel *
CD Gerardo Barrios		Cancha Municipal de San Rafael Oriente	(Brazil) Eraldo Correira *	(El Salvador) N/A	(Colombia) Fary Mancilla (Colombia) Jose Marcos Quinonez
Ilopango FC	TBD	Estadio Joaquin Gutierrez Apopa	(El Salvador) Fredy Santos *	(El Salvador) N/A	(Colombia) Camilo Gomez (Colombia) Bryan Zuluga
Inter San Salvador	Santa Tecla	Estadio las Delicias	(El Salvador) Juan Carlos Melgar *	(El Salvador) N/A	(Colombia)
Municipal FC		Estadio Jose Milan Morales	(El Salvador) Marvin Zepeda *	(El Salvador) Eder Polanco	(Colombia) Hector Lenus * (Colombia) TBD
Marte Soyapango	Soyapango	Cancha Jorgito Melendez	(El Salvador) Mauricio Alfaro	(El Salvador) Erick Molina	(Colombia) Jhony Moran Chan (Colombia) Argenis Alba
Once Lobos	Santa Ana	Estadio	(Argentina) Carlos Che Martinez *	(El Salvador) N/A	(Argentina) Luciano Ezequiel Soria * (Argentina) Facundo Julian Carrizo *
Rácing Jr	Armenia	Estadio 21 de Noviembre Armenia	(El Salvador) Angel Orellana *	(El Salvador) Freddy Portillo	(Brazil) TBD (Brazil) Josielson Moraes *
San Pablo Municipal	San Pabo Tacahico	Cancha Municipal Valle Meza	(El Salvador) Rafael Mariona *	(El Salvador) Felix Sanchez	(Colombia) Bryan Obregon (Colombia)
AD Santa Rosa Guachipilín	Santa Rosa Guachipilín, Santa Ana	Estadio Jose Hernandez	(El Salvador) Marvin Linares *	(El Salvador) Denis Monterrosa	(Colombia) Juna Chann (Colombia) Yeferson Palacios
Titan	Texistepeque, Santa Ana	Estadio Titan	(El Salvador) Jorge Abrego *	(El Salvador)	(Colombia) Neimer Miranda * (Colombia) Jhony Moran *
C.D. Topiltzín	Jisquilisco	Estadio Topiltzin de Jiquilisco	(El Salvador) Sebastian Hernandez	(El Salvador) Ever Corto	(Colombia) William Guerrero (Colombia) Jose Miguel Medrano
Vendaval	Apopa	Estadio Joaquin Gutierrez	(El Salvador) Jorge Calles *	(El Salvador) Alan Gonzalez	(Colombia) Boris Polo (Colombia) Alvaro Moreno (Colombia) Teodulo Bonilla *

=== Regular seasons ===
==== Group A ====
Pos	Team	Pld	W	D	L	GF	GA	GD	Pts	Qualification or relegation
1	Real Destroyer	20	9	6	5	40	31	+9	33	Advance to Playoffs
2	Inter Silver Sivar	18	8	7	3	37	28	+9	31	Advance to Playoffs
3	San Pablo Tacachico	18	9	3	6	33	25	+8	30	Advance to Playoffs
4	Rácing Jr	18	8	5	5	27	20	+7	29	Advance to Playoffs
5	Titan	18	7	3	8	30	27	+3	24	
6	Municipal F.C.	18	6	6	6	31	29	+2	24	
7	Real Atletico Sonsonate	18	6	6	6	26	29	−3	24	
8	Vendaval	18	5	5	8	27	32	−5	20	
9	Once Lobos	18	4	7	7	25	29	−4	19	
10	A.D. Santa Rosa	18	3	2	13	19	45	−26	11	

Rules for classification: 1) points; 2) goal difference; 3) number of goals scored.

==== Group B ====
Pos	Team	Pld	W	D	L	GF	GA	GD	Pts	Qualification or relegation
1	Dragon	18	12	5	1	0	0	0	41	Advance to Playoffs
2	Cacahuatique	18	11	3	4	41	15	+26	36	Advance to Playoffs
3	Fuerte San Francisco	18	9	8	1	25	11	+14	35	Advance to Playoffs
4	Marte Soyapango	18	9	6	3	30	15	+15	33	Advance to Playoffs
5	Aspirante	18	8	3	7	22	19	+3	27	
6	Topiltzin	18	4	7	7	23	26	−3	19	
7	Gerardo Barrios	18	5	4	9	16	38	−22	19	
8	Ilopango FC	18	2	11	5	19	24	−5	17	
9	Corinto FC	18	3	3	12	10	26	−16	12	
10	El Vencedor	18	1	2	15	20	55	−35	5	

Rules for classification: 1) points; 2) goal difference; 3) number of goals scored.

==== Grupo A ====
Rank	Player	Club	Goals
1	(Colombia) Jhony Moran	Titan	17
2	(El Salvador) Aquiles Mendez	Racing Jr	11
3	(El Salvador) Reynaldo Carpio	Real Destroyer	10
4	(Colombia) Hector Lemus	Municipal FC	10
5	(Colombia) Yefersson Palacios	A.D. Santa Rosa	10

==== Grupo B ====
Rank	Player	Club	Goals
1	(El Salvador) Javier Ferman	Dragon	13
2	(El Salvador) Alex Marquez	Fuerte San Francisco	12
3	(Colombia) Luis Palacios	Cachuatique	10
4	(El Salvador) David Diaz	Marte Soyapango	10
5	(El Salvador) Elias Gumero	Topiltzin	9

== Finals ==
=== Quarter finals ===
==== First leg ====
May 1, 2022
15:00

Racing Jr	1-1	A.D. Destroyer
Diego Martinez		Cristian Caicedo

Estadio 21 de Noviembre,, Armenia, Sonsonate

May 1, 2022
15:00

San Pablo Municipal	1-2	Inter Sivar Silva
Juan Villeda		Saul Cabrera 13'; Jose Villavicencio

Complejo Valle Meza, San Pablo Tacachico

May 1, 2022
15:00

Fuerte San Francisco	0-1	Cacahuatique
nil		Kelvin Hernandez

Estadio Correcaminos, San Francisco Gotera, Morazon

May 1, 2022
15:00

Marte Soyapango	1-1	C.D. Dragon
Carlos Zamora 93'		Manuel Murillo 16''

Estadio Espana, Soyapango, San Salvador

==== Second leg ====
May __, 2022

A.D. Destroyer	1-2	Racing Jr
Reynaldo Carpio		Aquiles Mendez

Cancha Chilama, Puerto de La Libertad

Racing Jr won 3–2 on Aggregate

May __, 2022

Inter Sivar Silva	2-1	San Pablo Municipal
Cesar Orellana 10'; Harold Alas 80'		Raul Quijada 40'

Estadio Las Delicas, Santa Tecla

Inter San Salvador won 4–2 on Aggregate

May __, 2022

Cacahuatique	2-2	Fuerte San Francisco
Cristian Portillo 40'; Iider Reyes 60' (pen.)		Roberto Carlos Sol 16'; Alexander Marquez 28'

Cancha El Amaton, Ciudad Barrios

Cacahuatique won 3–2 on Aggregate.

May __, 2022

C.D. Dragon	1-0	Marte Soyapango
Javier Ferman 37'		Nil

Estadio Juan Francisco Barraza, San Miguel

C.D. Dragon won 2–1 on Aggregate.

=== Semi finals ===
==== First leg ====
15 May 2022

Racing Jnr	1-1	Inter Sivar
Aquiles Mendez 66'		Harold Alas 75'

Estadio 21 de Noviembre, Armenia, Sonsonate

15 May 2022

Cacahuatique	0-3	Dragon
Nil		Kevin Mejia 14'; Romel Mejia 46'; Javier Ferman 63'

Centro Ecologico El Amaton, Ciduad Barrios, San Migiel

==== Second leg ====
May 21, 2022
18:00

Inter Sivar	2-0	Racing Jnr
Jairo Martinez 11'; Harold Alas 23'		Nil

Estadio Las Delicas, Santa Tecla, El Salvador

Inter SS won 3–1 on Aggregate.

May 22, 2022

Dragon	3-4	Cacahuatique
Javier Ferman 16' 80'; Rommel Mejia 44'		Jordy Bonilla 21'; Carlos Argueta 75'; Cristian Portillo 82'; Luis Arboleada 91'

Estadio Juan Francisco Barraza, San Migiel

Dragon won 6–4 on Aggregate

=== Grand final ===
May 28, 2022
15:30pm

Inter San Salvador	1-2	Dragon
Kevin Mejia 77'	[ ]	Javier Ferman 16'; Henry Alvarez 59'

Estadio Cuscatlan, San Salvador, El Salvador
Referee: Walter Melara

Inter SS
GK	30	(El Salvador) Steven Argueta
DF	14	(El Salvador) William Flores
DF	4	(El Salvador) Kevin Mejia
DF	6	(El Salvador) Fidel Jimenez
DF	2	(El Salvador) Nelson Galdamez
MF	20	(El Salvador) Saul Cabrera	Substituted off
MF	22	(El Salvador) Kilmar Echeverria
MF	11	(El Salvador) Jairo Martinez	Substituted off
MF	24	(El Salvador) Jose Villavicencio
MF	32	(El Salvador) Cesar Orellana
FW	7	(El Salvador) Harold Alas	Substituted off
Substitutes:
FW		(El Salvador) TBD	Substituted on
MF		(El Salvador) TBD	Substituted on
MF		(El Salvador) TBD	Substituted on
Manager:
(El Salvador) Juan Carlos Melgar

Dragon:
GK	1	(El Salvador) Felipe Amaya
DF	24	(El Salvador) Kevin Berrios
DF	3	(El Salvador) Melvin Cruz
DF	2	(Colombia) Kevin Obregon
DF	12	(El Salvador) Cesar Lopez
MF	19	(El Salvador) Henry Alvarez (substituted off)
MF	17	(El Salvador) Zidane Martinez
MF	33	(El Salvador) Elmer Bonilla
FW	9	(Colombia) Manuel Murrillo
FW	11	(El Salvador) Javier Ferman
FW	16	(El Salvador) Rommel Mejia	Substituted off
Substitutes:
FW		(El Salvador) TBD	Substituted on
FW		(El Salvador) TBD	Substituted on
Manager:
(El Salvador) Marvin Benitez

Clausura 2022 champions

4th title

=== Individual awards ===
Hombre GOL	Best Goalkeeper Award
(Colombia) Johnny Moran; Titan	(El Salvador) Julian Chicas; Fuerte San Francisco

== Aggregate table ==
The Aggregate table is the general ranking for the 2021–22 season. This table is a sum of the Apertura 2021 and Clausura 2022 tournament standings. The aggregate table is used to determine the relegation to the Tercera divisions.
