= Ricardo Serrano =

Ricardo Serrano may refer to:

- Ricardo Serrano (cyclist) (born 1978), Spanish racing cyclist
- Ricardo Serrano (football manager) (born 1975), Salvadoran football coach
- Ricardo Serrano (runner) (born 1980), Spanish long-distance runner
