= Antonio García Prieto =

Salvadoran footballer (born 1964)

Personal information
- Full name: Jose Antonio García Prieto
- Date of birth: October 16, 1964 (age 62)
- Place of birth: San Salvador, El Salvador
- Position: Defender

Senior career*
Years	Team	Apps	(Gls)
1977-1978	Once Municipal		
1979–1987	Alianza F.C.		
1988–1989	Metapan F.C.		

International career
- El Salvador

Managerial career
- –2009: Titán
- 2010: FAS (Assistant)
- 2010–2012: Titán
- 2014: Once Lobos
- 2015: Alianza (Assistant)
- 2019: Real Pajonal
- 2019: Titán
- * Club domestic league appearances and goals

Jose Antonio García Prieto (born 16 October 1964 in San Salvador, El Salvador) is a retired Salvadoran football player and current coach of Titán.

== Playing career ==
=== Club ===
Prieto started his professional career at Once Municipal for two years, before he joined historical club Alianza F.C. where he played the majority of his career. He was part of the team that conquered 1986-87 title. He ended his career at A.D. Isidro Metapan.

== Managerial career ==
After retiring from professional football, Prieto was appointed manager of Titán in 2008. He briefly joined FAS as assistant manager before returning to Titán in 2010. Prieto second spell at Titán was his most successful spell in his managerial career, winning 2 Segunda División Salvadorean titles (Apertura 2010, Apertura 2011), the club almost won promotion on both occasion, however the club lost both matches against Juventud Independiente and Santa Tecla F.C. Following the club folding and being on hiatus for several years, Prieto joined Once Lobos and later re-joined the coaching staff at Alianza helping the team win .

== Honours ==
=== Club honours ===
==== As a player ====
- Alianza
  - Primera División de Fútbol de El Salvador (1): 1986-1987

==== As a coach ====
- Titán
  - Segunda División Salvadorean (2): Apertura 2010, Apertura 2011
- Real Pajonal
  - Tercera Division de Fútbol Salvadoreño (1): Clausura 2019
- Alianza (Assistant)
  - Primera División de Fútbol de El Salvador (1) Apertura 2015
