= EF San Pablo Tacachico =

Association football club in El Salvador

San Pablo F.C
- Full name: San Pablo Fútbol Club
- Founded: 12 April 2000; 26 years ago
- Ground: Cancha Valle Mezas, San Pablo Tacachico, La Libertad
- Capacity: 5,000
- Manager: (El Salvador) Rafael Mariona
- League: (El Salvador) Segunda División
Home colours	Away colours

Escuela Integral de San Pablo Tacachico are a Salvadoran professional football club based in San Pablo Tacachico, La Libertad, El Salvador.

The club currently plays in the Segunda División de Fútbol Salvadoreño.

== History ==
In 2014, the club participe in the third division

On 5 July 2015, the club had purchased a license to be able to compete in the newly increased second division.

San Pablo Municipal won the club first segunda division title, winning the Clausura 2019 title, after they defeated Platense 4–1 in penalties after tying in a two-legged series 3–3.

This was title was followed with the most devastating event in the club history, as San Pablo were unable to defeat El Vencedor (who were the 2018 Apertura Champion) in a promotion playoff 6–5 after penalties, after tying 0–0. Which prevented the club to play in the primera division (the top division in El Salvador) for the first time ever in the club history.

On 29 June 2024, EF San Pablo Tacachico announced on the team social media platform that due to several sponsors pulling support, high team cost and lack of fans support, the club announced they would be withdrawing from the Segunda Division.

== Honours ==
=== Domestic honours ===
- Segunda División Salvadorean and predecessors
- Champions (1) : Clausura 2019
- Tercera División Salvadorean and predecessors
  - Champions:(1) :

== Current squad ==
As of February 2024: Note: Flags indicate national team as defined under FIFA eligibility rules; some limited exceptions apply. Players may hold more than one non-FIFA nationality.

No.	Pos.	Nation	Player
1	GK	SLV	Amilcar Flores
3		SLV	Felix Sanchez
4		SLV	Luis Lemus
5		SLV	Cristian Hercules
6		SLV	Kevin Flores
10		SLV	Leo Castro
11		SLV	Kevin Lemus
12		SLV	Marvin Jimenez
14		SLV	Bladimir Figueroa
15		SLV	Ever Avila
16		SLV	Edwin Claros
21		SLV	Roberto Medina
23		SLV	Kevin Murcia
25		SLV	Jonathan Perez
30		SLV	Rene Salinas
31		SLV	Mario Lopez
32		SLV	Alberto Peraza
33		SLV	Orellana
38		SLV	Elden Portillo

No.	Pos.	Nation	Player
—		SLV	Ariel Toledo
—		SLV	Kelvin Rivera
—		SLV	Rigoberto Castillo
—		SLV	Roberto Murcia
—		SLV	Nain Pineda
—		SLV	

=== In ===
Note: Flags indicate national team as defined under FIFA eligibility rules; some limited exceptions apply. Players may hold more than one non-FIFA nationality.

No.	Pos.	Nation	Player
—		SLV	Cristian Hercules (From Free agent)
—		COL	Jorman Martinez (From Free agent)
—		SLV	Edwin Claros (From C.D. Vendaval)
—	MF	SLV	Leo Castro (From Michigan Wolverines men's soccer)
—	DF	SLV	Luis Lemus (From AD Masahuat])
—	FW	SLV	Miguel Martinez (From Los Turcos F.C.)

No.	Pos.	Nation	Player
—	MF	SLV	Jonathon Perez (From C.D. Vendaval)
—		SLV	Marvin Jimenez (From C.D. Vendaval)
—		SLV	TBD (From Free agent)

=== Out ===
Note: Flags indicate national team as defined under FIFA eligibility rules; some limited exceptions apply. Players may hold more than one non-FIFA nationality.

No.	Pos.	Nation	Player
—		SLV	Brayan Erazo (To Santa Tecla)
—		SLV	Oscar Cortez (To TBD)
—		SLV	Kelvin Rivero (To TBD)
—		SLV	Rafael Guerrero (To TBD)

No.	Pos.	Nation	Player
—		SLV	Jefferson Mejia (To TBD)
—		SLV	TBD (To TBD)
—		SLV	TBD (To TBD)

== Coaching staff ==
Position	Staff
Manager	(El Salvador) Jose Angel Reyes
Assistant Manager	(El Salvador) TBD
Reserve Manager	(El Salvador) TBD
Ladies's Manager	(El Salvador) TBD
Physical coach	(El Salvador) TBD
Assistant Physical coach	(El Salvador) TBD
Goalkeeper Coach	(El Salvador) TBD
Kineslogic	(El Salvador) TBD
Utility Equipment	(El Salvador) TBD
Football director	(El Salvador) TBD
Team Doctor	(El Salvador) TBD

== List of coaches ==
- (El Salvador) Angel Orellana (May 2015 – June 2015)
- (El Salvador) Efrain Burgos (June 2015 – Sep 2015)
- (Uruguay) Pablo Quiñonez (Sep 2015 – Dec 2015)
- (El Salvador) Miguel Angel Soriano (Dec 2015 – Feb 2016)
- (El Salvador) Juan Francisco Najarro (Mar 2016– Aug 2016)
- (El Salvador) Bairon Ernesto Garcia (Sep 2016–)
- (El Salvador) Juan Ramon Paredes (2016)
- (Uruguay) Pablo Quiñones (- June 2018)
- (El Salvador) Juan Ramon Sanchez (June 2018 – July 2019)
- (El Salvador) Oscar 'Lagarto' Ulloa (July 2019 – December 2019)
- (Colombia) Henry Vanegas (December 2019 – August 2020)
- (El Salvador) Wilber Aguilar (September 2020 – January 2021)
- (El Salvador) Rafael Mariona (January 2021 – August 2022)
- (El Salvador) Luis Saravia (September 2022 – December 2022)
- (El Salvador) Jose Angel Reyes (December 2022 – December 2023)
- (El Salvador) Dony Valle (January 2024 – present)
