= Texistepeque =

- District
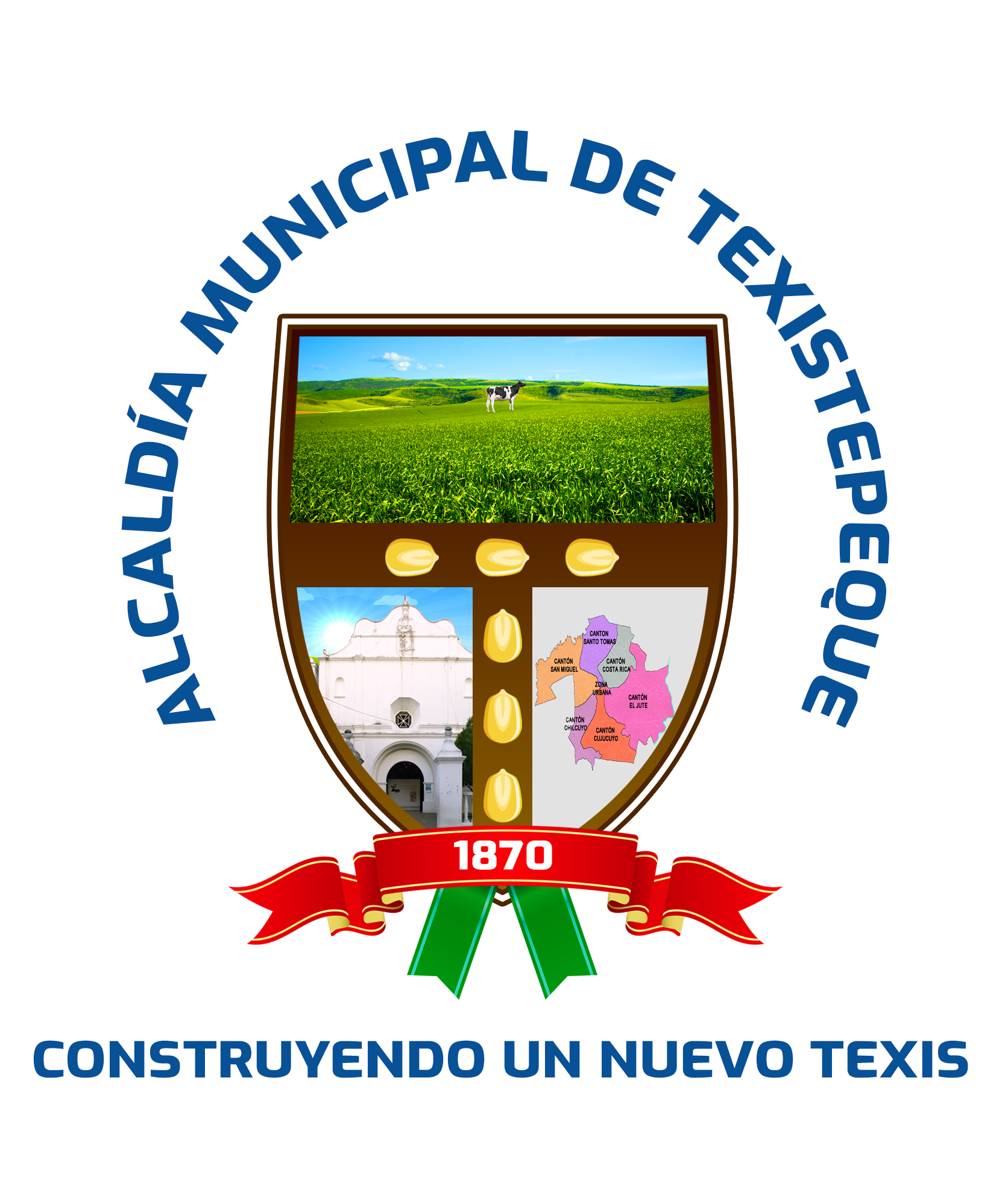
- Seal
- Nickname: Texis
- Location in El Salvador
- Coordinates: 14°08′N 89°30′W
- Country: El Salvador
- Department: Santa Ana

Government
  - Mayor: Carlos Landaverde

Area
  - District: 69.10 sq mi (178.97 km^{2})
- Elevation: 1,329 ft (405 m)

Population
  - District: 19,271

Texistepeque (Nawat: Tēksistepēk) is a local district in the municipality of Santa Ana Norte in the Santa Ana department of western El Salvador. It lies in the center of the department, north of Santa Ana and south of Metapán and Masahuat. It was founded by the Poqomam Maya peoples and conquered by the Pipil people of Cuzcatlan until the Spanish conquest. The meaning of its name comes from the Nawat language and means place of eggs or alternatively mountain of eggs; from Nawat teksis (eggs), and tepec or tepet (mountain) which indicates a place name.

== History ==
The area around Texistepeque was originally populated by the Poqomam Maya and later fell under the dominion of the lords of Cuzcatlan under the altepetl Tecomatan-Texistepeque until the Spanish conquest of El Salvador in the early 16th century. After El Salvador gained its independence from Spain in 1821, it formed part of the Sonsonate Department until that department was split between the newly formed Santa Ana department in 1855.

The town is predominantely of Nahua descent, with it being mostly indigenous up until relatively recently. It was also the last documented village in Santa Ana to have spoken Nawat into relatively modern times, with no remaining speakers reported after the early 1900s. Alongside Chalchuapa, it remains one of the last two districts with a continuous indigenous community in Santa Ana.

=== Church of Texistepeque ===
The church is located in the city of the same name. It is located on the highway towards Metapán, 17 kilometers north of Santa Ana. It is not known who built it, but its edification probably dates back to the 18th century.

Its style is Baroque, with an altarpiece facade, divided in three bodies and decorated by half columns and semi-arched niches. The españada is finished off by scrolls and pinnacles, and crowned by a kind of tabernacle that houses a clock. The steeples are embedded on the facade and they are of a later construction. The lateral facades have supporting columns and are decorated with entablature. The current roof is of Iron sheets, but previously, it was built with wood and tiles.

The interior of the church is a wing containing ten wooden columns of a single trunk with stone bases almost 80 centimeters in height. Inside the church, the roof is wooden and the suspenders are what is conserved of the coffered Mudejar.

There are parochial registrations from the 18th century and data in the General Registration of Central America that say: “the community of the town of San Esteban-Texistepeque requests funds to finish the reconstruction of the town (year 1743)”. In 1755, they were given the fourth part of the tributes paid for the reconstruction of the temple.

== Culture ==
The patron saint of Texistepeque is Saint Stephen and festivals honoring this saint, are held from December 17 to December 27. As a result of volcanic eruptions devastating the town of Belen-Güijat in 1737, many refugees relocated to the town of Texistepeque, bringing the Virgin of Belen-Güija along. She is also considered a patron saint of the town and shares the same patron festivities with Saint Stephen.

Texistepeque is also home to one of the earliest printing press within El Salvador, with friar Juan de Dios del Cid printing the first Salvadoran book titled El Puntero Apuntado con Apuntes Breves in 1741. It focuses on the uses of añil, and the dye was also used to create the ink used to print it.

=== Talcigüines ===
The town is famous for its Talcigüines (Nawat: Tāltzikwīni), whip-bearing locals who, dressed as demons, whip residents on the streets at the beginning of Holy Week, this tradition dates back to around 1850 and is a surviving example of a Nahua drama within the country. The festivity was awarded the title of Intangible Cultural Asset by the Salvadoran Legislative Assembly in 2015.

The local professional football club is named C.D. Titán and it currently plays in the Salvadoran Second Division.

== Administration ==
The total population of Texistepeque is 19,271 inhabitants. The incumbent mayor or alcalde as of 2024 is Carlos Landaverde from Nuevas Ideas. The district consists of six subdivisions called Cantones and 78 hamlets:

Costa Rica

- Caserío Costa Rica
- Caserío las Mesas
- Caserío El Aguacatal
- Caserío La Florida
- Caserío Piedras Negras
- Caserío Lagunetas
- Caserío Los Cerritos
- Caserío El Pilón

Cujucuyo

- Caserío Cujucuyo
- Caserío El Sompopo
- Caserío El Sillón
- Caserío Las Mesitas
- Caserío El Triunfo
- Caserío San Luis
- Caserío La Montañita
- Caserío Tras El Cerro
- Caserío San Jacinto

Chilcuyo

- Caserío Chilcuyo
- Caserío La Azacualpa
- Caserío Valle Nuevo
- Caserío La Y griega
- Caserío San José El Triunfo
- Caserío Los Mangos
- Caserío San Joaquín

El Jute

- Caserío El Jute
- Caserío Agua Caliente
- Caserío Santiburcio
- Caserío Los Jobos
- Caserío 3 Puertas
- Caserío Las Brisas
- Caserío Los Orcones
- Caserío Guarnecia
- Caserío Chacurras
- Caserío El Tamarindo
- Caserío Segovia
- Caserío Las Negritas

San Miguel

- Caserío El Paraizo
- Caserío San Miguel
- Caserío El Sunza
- Caserío San Andrés
- Caserío Sandovales
- Caserío El llano del Amate
- Caserío Potrerillo
- Caserío La Estancia
- Caserío San Esteban
- Caserío El Guiscoyol
- Caserío El Tule
- Caserío El Matalin
- Caserío Ojo de Agua
- Caserío Sabana Larga
- Caserío La Estación los Mangos

Santo Tomas

- Caserío Santo Tomás
- Caserío Santa Elena
- Caserío Casitas
- Caserío Monte del Padre
- Caserío San Antoñito
- Caserío San Marcos
- Caserío San Jorge
- Caserío El Menudito
- Caserío Nance Dulce
- Caserío Piletas

The district is served by the Parish of San Esteban, Texistepeque.

== Geography ==
Texistepeque lies at 405 meters above sea level and has a territory of 178.97 km². The Lempa River passes through the eastern edge of the municipality and serves as a border between it and the Chalatenango Department.
