= Josué Flores =

Salvadorian footballer (born 1988)

Personal information
- Full name: Josué Odir Flores Palencia
- Date of birth: May 13, 1988 (age 38)
- Place of birth: Santa Ana, El Salvador
- Height: 1.73 m (5 ft 8 in)
- Position: Midfielder

Youth career
- 2005: CD Titán

Senior career*
Years	Team	Apps	(Gls)
2006–2009	CD FAS		
2010	AD Isidro Metapán		
2011–2013	Alianza FC		
2013–2014	Zakho FC		
2014–2015	AD Isidro Metapán	57	(12)
2015–2016	Cimarrones de Sonora	15	(1)
2016–2017	AD Isidro Metapán	47	(11)
2017	CD Águila	19	(3)
2018–2019	Deportivo Guastatoya	20	(3)
2019–2020	Cobán Imperial	52	(2)
2020	AD Isidro Metapán	9	(1)
2020-2021	Deportivo Iztapa	18	(4)
2021	Xelajú MC	20	(1)

International career
- El Salvador U17
- El Salvador U20
2007	El Salvador U23		
2010	El Salvador	3	(0)
- * Club domestic league appearances and goals

Josué Odir Flores Palencia (born May 13, 1988) is a Salvadoran professional footballer.

== Club career ==
Nicknamed El Chino, Flores was born in Santa Ana, El Salvador. He played as a midfielder for Alianza after signing a contract with the club starting in the Clausura 2011 tournament. He previously played for FAS and Isidro Metapán before joining Alianza. He was named as the most valuable player for the Apertura 2009 final, after scoring one goal and leading FAS to its seventeenth title.

=== Zakho ===
In October 2013, he signed with Iraqi team Zakho. During his first season abroad he made twelve appearances and scored four goals for Zakho as they finished in 10th position. Although his stay at Zakho ended once the conclusion of the season due to instability in Iraq, his impact on the field and off field was major that he became a fan favourite.

== International career ==
Flores made his debut for El Salvador in a February 2010 friendly match against the United States.
