= Santa Elena, El Salvador =

City and district in Usulután, El Salvador

Santa Elena
- City and District
- Ciudad de Santa Elena
- Location in El Salvador
- Coordinates: 13°23′0″N 88°25′0″W
- Country: El Salvador
- Department: Usulután
- Municipality: Usulután Este

Area
  - Total: 54.91 km^{2} (21.20 sq mi)
- Elevation: 44 m (144 ft)

Population (2024)
  - Total: 16,051

Santa Elena is a city and district located in the Usulután Department of El Salvador. Historically recognized as a major center for tobacco processing, it is a significant urban district within the municipality of Usulután Este.

== History ==
=== Foundation and Early Development ===
The town was established on the fertile plains of eastern El Salvador and granted the title of Villa (Town) on February 25, 1857. It was officially incorporated into the Usulután Department upon its creation on June 22, 1865.

=== The Fire of 1882 and City Status ===
In 1882, a catastrophic fire nearly destroyed the Barrio La Parroquia, the city's historical and religious center. In recognition of its commercial and demographic growth, it was elevated to the status of Ciudad (City) on July 5, 1932.

== Geography and Administrative Divisions ==
Santa Elena is located at an elevation of 44 metres (144 ft). It is divided into an urban core (Casco Urbano) and a rural sector.

- Urban Neighborhoods (Barrios): La Parroquia, El Calvario, Los Remedios, and Analco.
- Rural Villages (Cantones): El Nisperal, Joya Ancha, Las Cruces, Los Amates, Los Conejos, Nancistepeque, Piedra de Agua, Pozo de la Puerta, and Volcán de Santa Elena.

== Economy ==
=== Tobacco and Agriculture ===
Historically, Santa Elena was a primary hub for the tobacco industry, serving as a centralized processing and distribution point. Today, it remains a commercial center for maize, beans, and livestock.

=== Mineral Resources ===
Following the national reversal of the mining ban in late 2024, the area has been identified as sitting atop part of the eastern volcanic mineralization belt. Geological surveys indicate potential for gold and silver deposits in the surrounding volcanic range.

== Notable people ==
- Elías Antonio "Tony" Saca (born 1965): The 78th President of El Salvador (2004–2009). Saca was born and raised in Santa Elena and is of Palestinian-Salvadoran descent.

== Culture ==
The city celebrates its Fiestas Patronales from August 10 to 18 in honor of its patron, Saint Helena (Santa Elena). The festivities include traditional religious events held at the central parish church.

== Sports ==
The city is represented by CD El Vencedor, founded in 1921. The club has historically competed in the professional divisions of the Salvadoran Football Federation. The team plays its home matches at the Estadio José Germán Rivas Lozano.
