= A.D. Santa Rosa Guachipilín =

Salvadoran football club

Santa Rosa Guachipilín
- Full name: Asociación Deportiva Santa Rosa Guachipilín
- Founded: 2015
- Ground: Estadio José Hernández
- Chairman: Carlos Enrique Calderón
- Manager: Samuel Maldonaldo
- Grupo
Home colours

Asociación Deportiva Santa Rosa Guachipilín are a Salvadoran professional football club based in Santa Rosa Guachipilín, El Salvador. The club currently plays in the Second Division of El Salvador.

== History ==
On 27 May 2018, Santa Rosa Guachipilín won the Tercera Division play-off Final against Turin FESA to gain promotion to the segunda division.

== Honours ==
=== League ===
- Tercera Division and predecessors
- Champions: (1) : Apertura 2017
- Champions: 2017–2018 (Play-offs Champions)
- La Asociación Departamental de Fútbol Aficionado and predecessors (4th tier)
  - Champions (1): 2016

== Sponsors ==
- Diadora
- Alcaldía Municipal de Santa Rosa Guachipilín

== List of coaches ==
- (El Salvador) Samuel Maldonaldo (- December 2018)
- (Argentina) Carlos Martínez (December 2018 – December 2019)
- (El Salvador) Samuel Maldonaldo (December 2019 - May 2021)
- (El Salvador) Alfredo Portillo Petro (June 2021-Present)
