= C.D. Titán =

Association football club in El Salvador

Titán
- Full name: Club Deportivo Titán
- Nicknames: Los de Texistepeque, Los de Texis, Los Talcigüines
- Founded: 1930; 96 years ago
- Ground: Estadio Titan Texistepeque, Texistepeque; Texistepeque, El Salvador
- Chairman: Williams Garcia
- Manager: Pablo Quiñones
- League: Segunda División
- Clausura 2024: Semi-finalist
Home colours	Away colours

Club Deportivo Titán is a Salvadoran professional football club based in Texistepeque, Santa Ana Department, El Salvador.

The club currently participates in the Segunda División de Fútbol Salvadoreño. Their home stadium is Cancha Sandoval.

== History ==
Founded in 1930, Titán won their first league title on 26 December 2010, with a victory over Juventud Independiente, thanks to a goal from Panamanian striker Víctor Barrera. They won their second title however both time they lost their promotion matches to Juventud Independiente and Santa Tecla F.C. On 9 July, Titan sent a message on their official page announcing due to financial trouble the club sold their spot in the segunda division to C.D. Sonsonate.

Titan announced on their social media page on July 13, 2024, that they have acquired a spot in the Primera division, purchasing the spot of Jocoro.

FESFUT announced with Jocoro failure to meet the requirement to register in the Primera Division, they would lose their spot and therefore could sell their spot to Titan. Despite protest and pleas from Titan board to be allowed to take the spot and give a slight extension to the club for meet the requirement, On June 18, 2024 FESFUT President Humberto Sáenz Marinero announced the league will proceed with 11 teams.

On January 11, 2025 C.D. Titan announced on the team social media platform that due to several sponsors pulling support, high team cost and lack of fans support, the club announced they would be withdrawing from the Clausura 2025 season.

== Honours ==
=== Domestic honours ===
- Segunda División Salvadorean and predecessors
  - Champions (4) : Apertura 2010, Apertura 2011, Clausura 2023, Apertura 2023
- Tercera División Salvadorean and predecessors
  - Champions:(2) : 1970-71, 2007–08
- Liga ADFAS and predecessors
  - Champions:(1) :

== Stadium ==
- Estadio Titan Texistepeque (TBD-Present)
  - Estadio Jorge Calero Suárez (July 2024)

Titan plays its home games at Estadio Titan Texistepeque in Texistepeque. However the club stated the Estadio Titan Texistepeque was too small to play in the Primera division therefore they moved their games to the bigger Estadio Jorge Calero Suárez.

== Sponsorship ==
Companies that Titan currently has sponsorship deals with for 2024–2025 includes:

- J&M Bordados – Official kit suppliers
- TBD – Official sponsors
- TBD – Official sponsors
- TBD – Official sponsors
- TBD – Official sponsors
- TBD – Official sponsors

== Club records ==
- First Match in the Primera Division for Titan: 3-2 TBD, Month Day, 2024
- First victory in the Primera Division for Titan: 3-2 TBD, Month Day, 2024
- First goalscorer in the Primera Division for Titan: Uruguayan TBD v TBD, Month Day, 2024
- 50th goal in the Primera Division for Titan: TBD v TBD, Month Day, 2024
- Largest Home victory, Primera División: 5-1 v TBD, Month Day, 2024
- Largest Away victory, Primera División: 3-0 v TBD, Month Day, 2024
- Largest Home loss, Primera División: 1–3 v TBD, Month Day, 2024
- Largest Away loss, Primera División: 1-4 v TBD, Month Day, 2024
- Highest home attendance: 2,000 v Primera División, 2018
- Highest away attendance: 1,000 v Primera División, San Salvador, 2018
- Highest average attendance, season: 49,176, Primera División
- Most goals scored, season, Primera División: 25, Apertura 2018
- Worst season: Segunda Division 2002-2003: 0 win, 0 draws and 00 losses (00 points)

=== Individual records ===
- Record appearances (all competitions): TBD, 822 from 1957 to 1975
- Record appearances (Primera Division): Honduran Junior Padilla, 150 from 2020 to Present
- Most capped player for El Salvador: 63 (0 whilst at Titan), TBD
- Most international caps for El Salvador while a Titan player: 3, TBD
- Most caps won whilst at Titan: 3, TBD
- Record scorer in league: Salvadorian JTBD, 25
- Most goals in a season (all competitions): TBD, 62 (1927/28) (47 in League, 15 in Cup competitions)
- Most goals in a season (Primera Division): Argentinian TBD, 15

== Players ==
=== Current squad ===
As of September, 2024. Note: Flags indicate national team as defined under FIFA eligibility rules; some limited exceptions apply. Players may hold more than one non-FIFA nationality.

No.	Pos.	Nation	Player
1	GK	SLV	Amilcar Flores
2	DF	SLV	Julio Cerritos
3	DF	SLV	Bryan Guevara
4	DF	SLV	Rosemberg Cueva (captain)
5	MF	SLV	Adelso Galdamez
6	DF	SLV	Herber Morales
7	MF	SLV	Felipe Flores
8	MF	SLV	Alvaro Lucha
9	FW	PAN	Charles Bustamante
10	MF	SLV	Fernando Clavel
13	GK	SLV	Elmer Sandoval
14	DF	SLV	Francisco Alvarez
17	MF	SLV	Kevin Garay
19	MF	SLV	Mario Gutierrez
20	MF	SLV	Fernando Torres
21	MF	SLV	Uriel Miranda
22	GK	SLV	Carlos Flores
24	DF	SLV	Hugo Aguilar
26	MF	SLV	Cesar Lemus
27	FW	SLV	William Soto
28	FW	SLV	Bryan Ortega
30	DF	SLV	Rodrigo Vega

No.	Pos.	Nation	Player
—	MF	SLV	Michael Lopez
23	FW	SLV	Jesus Ochoa
32	DF	SLV	Kevin Hernandez

=== Players with dual citizenship ===
- (El Salvador) (United States) TBD

=== In ===
Note: Flags indicate national team as defined under FIFA eligibility rules; some limited exceptions apply. Players may hold more than one non-FIFA nationality.

No.	Pos.	Nation	Player
—		SLV	Bryan Ortega (From Isidro Metapan)
—		SLV	Fernando Clavel (From Isidro Metapan)
—		PAN	Charles Bustamante (From Free agent)
—		SLV	Kevin Garay (From Santa Tecla)
—	GK	SLV	Amilcar Flores (From Free agent)
—		SLV	Rodrigo Vega (From Free agent)

No.	Pos.	Nation	Player
—		SLV	Cesar Lemus (From FAS Reserves)
—		SLV	Bryan Guevara (From Santa Tecla Reserva)
—		SLV	Fernando Torres (From Santa Tecla Reserva)
—		SLV	TBD (From Free agent)

=== Out ===
Note: Flags indicate national team as defined under FIFA eligibility rules; some limited exceptions apply. Players may hold more than one non-FIFA nationality.

No.	Pos.	Nation	Player
—		SLV	Bryan Mancia (To Dragon)
—		SLV	Ernesto Paz (To TBD)
—		COL	Manuel Murrillo (To TBD)
—		SLV	Isai Aguilar (To TBD)
—		SLV	Dennis Garcia (To TBD)
—		SLV	David Diaz (To TBD)
—		SLV	Reinaldo Carpio (To TBD)

No.	Pos.	Nation	Player
—		SLV	Bladimir Figueroa (To TBD)
—		SLV	Osmaro Orellana (To TBD)
—		SLV	Jose Orellana (To TBD)
—		SLV	Diego Cartagena (To TBD)

== Coaching staff ==
Position	Staff
Manager	(Colombia) Guiodac Jamac Muñoz
Assistant Manager	(El Salvador) Walter Tobar
Reserve Manager	(El Salvador) TBD
Ladies's Manager	(El Salvador) TBD
Under 17 coach	(El Salvador) TBD
Physical coach	(El Salvador) Raul Cortez
Assistant Physical coach	(El Salvador) TBD
Goalkeeper Coach	(El Salvador) Enllelbert Gonzalez
Kineslogic	(El Salvador) TBD
Utility Equipment	(El Salvador) TBD
Football director	(El Salvador) TBD
Video Analyst	(El Salvador) Estefania Medina
Team Doctor	(El Salvador) TBD

== List of managers ==
- (El Salvador) Francisco Javier Flores ("Paco Flores")
- (El Salvador) Tadeo Ávalos
- (El Salvador) Jose Antonio García Prieto
- (El Salvador) Jorge Abrego (2010)
- (El Salvador) Antonio García Prieto (2010–2012)
- Hiatus (2013-2018)
- (Argentina) (El Salvador) Enzo Henríquez (July 2018 - December 2018)
- (El Salvador) Jose Antonio García Prieto (January 2019 - October 2019)
- (El Salvador) Edgar Batres (October 2019 - December 2019)
- (El Salvador) Jorge Abrego (January 2022 - June 2022)
- (El Salvador) Juan Ramón Sánchez (June 2022 - July 2023)
- (El Salvador) Hector Omar Mejia (July 2023 - July 2024)
- (Uruguay) Pablo Quiñones (July 2024)
- (Colombia) Guiodac Jamac Muñoz (September 2024 - December 2024)
- Hiatus (January 2025 - Present)

The following managers won at least one trophy when in charge of Titan
Name	Period	Trophies
(El Salvador) TBD	TBD - TBD	1 Segunda División Salvadorean ()
(El Salvador) Antonio García Prieto	2010–2012, January 2019 - October 2019	2 Segunda División Salvadorean (Apertura 2010, Apertura 2011)
(El Salvador) Juan Ramón Sánchez	June 2022 - July 2023	1 Segunda División Salvadorean (Clausura 2023)
(El Salvador) Hector Omar Mejia	July 2023- July 2024	1 Segunda División Salvadorean (Apertura 2023)

== List of notable players ==
- (El Salvador) Narciso Orellana
- (El Salvador) Odir Flores
- (El Salvador) Ricardo Ulloa
