= Juan Ramón Sánchez (footballer) =

Salvadoran footballer and manager (born 1952)

Personal information
- Full name: Juan Ramón Sánchez Paredes
- Date of birth: September 1, 1952 (age 74)
- Place of birth: Izalco, Sonsonate, El Salvador

Team information
- Current team: Juventud Independiente (manager)

International career
Years	Team	Apps	(Gls)
- El Salvador

Managerial career
- 1995–1996: Arcense
- 1997–2005: Juventud Independiente
- 2005–2006: Telecom F.C.
- 2007–2008: Chalatenango (assistant)
- 2008: Chalatenango
- 2008: Platense
- 2008–2015: Juventud Independiente
- 2015: El Salvador U23
- 2015–2016: Águila
- 2016–2017: LA Firpo
- 2018: Sonsonate
- 2018–2019: San Pablo Municipal
- 2019–2020: Chalatenango
- 2021: Inter Sivar
- 2022-2023: Titan
- 2023-2024: Santa Tecla
- 2024-: Juventud Independiente

Juan Ramón Sánchez Paredes (born September 1, 1952) is a Salvadorean football manager and former player who manages Juventud Independiente.

He is the father of former El Salvador national team captain Ramón Alfredo Sánchez, footballers Félix Sánchez and Dennis Sánchez.

== Managerial statistics ==
Team	Nat	From	To	Record				
Team	Nat	From	To	G	W	D	L	%
Chalatenango	El Salvador	February 2005	May 2005	15	6	5	4	51%
Juventud Independiente	El Salvador	November 2008; July 2011	May 2009; May 2015	153	52	41	60	42%
Aguila	El Salvador	January 2016	May 2016	27	16	7	4	67%
LA Firpo	El Salvador	September 2016	October 2017	48	17	14	17	45%
Chalatenango	El Salvador	July 2019	December 2020	43	10	19	14	%
Santa Tecla	El Salvador	October 2023	April 2024	16	4	5	7	%

== Honours ==
Season	Team	Title
Clausura 2008	Juventud Independiente	Segunda División de El Salvador
Clausura 2011	Juventud Independiente	Segunda División de El Salvador
Clausura 2019	San Pablo Municipal	Segunda División de El Salvador
