= Ricardo Serrano (football manager) =

Salvadoran football coach (born 1971)

Personal information
- Full name: Ricardo Arturo Serrano Alfaro
- Date of birth: November 14, 1971 (age 54)
- Place of birth: Chalatenango, El Salvador

Managerial career
- Years: Team
- 2006–2008: A.D. Chalatenango
- 2009: Luís Ángel Firpo (assistant)
- 2010–2012: A.D. Chalatenango
- 2013–2014: Atlético Comalapa
- 2014: C.D.Talleres Jr
- 2015: A.D. Chalatenango (assistant)
- 2015–2016: C.D. Marte Soyapango
- 2017: A.D. Chalatenango (director)
- 2018–2019: C.D. Alacranes 33 (director)
- 2020–2021: A.D. Chalatenango reserve (assistant)
- 2022–2023: A.D. Chalatenango (director)

Ricardo Arturo Serrano Alfaro (born 14 November 1971, in Chalatenango) is a Salvadoran football coach.

== Managerial career ==
Nicknamed la pulga, he became coach of C.D. Chalatenango in September 2015.
