= San Pablo Tacachico =

- District
- Location in El Salvador
- Coordinates: 13°59′N 89°20′W
- Country: El Salvador
- Department: La Libertad
- Elevation: 1,004 ft (306 m)

Population (2024)
  - District: 18,710
  - Estimate (2026): 24,474
  - Rank: 78th in El Salvador
  - Urban: 6,624
  - Rural: 12,086

San Pablo Tacachico is a municipality in the La Libertad department of El Salvador.
