= CD El Vencedor =

Association football club in El Salvador

El Vencedor
- Full name: Club Deportivo El Vencedor
- Founded: 19 June 1921; 105 years ago
- Ground: Estadio José Germán Rivas; Santa Elena, Usulután, El Salvador
- Chairman: José Ferrufino Melara
- Manager: Nelson Ancheta
- League: Liga de Ascenso
- 2026-2027: Promoted
Home colours	Away colours

Club Deportivo El Vencedor, commonly referred to as El Vencedor, is a Salvadoran professional football club based at Santa Elena, Usulután Department, El Salvador.

The club currently plays in the Liga de Ascenso.

== History ==
El Vencedor won the Apertura 2018 title, after they defeated Platense 4–1 in penalties after tying in a two-legged series.

This was title was followed with the most glorious event in the club history, as El Vencedor were able to once again defeat San Pablo Tachico (who were the Clausura 2019 Champion) in a promotion playoff 6–5 after penalties, after tying 0–0. Which enabled the club to play in the primera division (the top division in El Salvador) for the first time ever in the club history.

El Vencedor ownership had reportedly experienced thousands dollars in operating losses since El Vencedor joined the Primera division. The club president Marlon Claros stated that due to a lack of corporate support for the team and the municipality withdrew it support. Following the closure of the shortened 2020 Clausura season due to CO-VID 19 virus pandemic, The club eventually seceded their spot to Atletico Marte .

== Honours ==
=== Domestic honours ===
- Segunda División Salvadorean and predecessors
- Champions (1): 2018 Apertura
  - Promotion Play-off Winners (1): 2018–2019
  - Promotion Runner up (2): 1982, 1986
- Tercera División Salvadorean and predecessors
  - Champions (2): 1977, 2003-2004 Zona Oriental
  - Runners up (1): Apertura 2025 (Centro Oriente)

== Stadium ==
- Estadio José Germán Rivas, Santa Elena (-2019; 2023-Present)
  - Estadio Jiboa, San Vicente (2019)
  - Estadio Sergio Torres (2019–2020)
  - Estadio Las Delicias, Santa Tecla (2020)

El Vencedor plays its home games at Estadio José Germán Rivas in Santa Elena, Uslutlan. However the club stated the Estadio German Lozano was too small to play in the primera division therefore they moved their games to the bigger Estadio Jiboa. In September 2019 the club made an agreement with the owners of Luis Angel Firpo to play their home games at Estadio Sergio Torres.

== Sponsorship ==
Companies that El Vencedor currently has sponsorship deals with for 2025–2026 includes:

- (El Salvador) Sport Milrum – Official kit suppliers
- (El Salvador) CableSat – Official sponsors
- (El Salvador) Diabla – Official sponsors
- (Mexico) Electrolit – Official sponsors
- (El Salvador) Las Cabanitas – Official sponsors
- (El Salvador) General Autoparts – Official sponsors
- (El Salvador) Eletcric Clima – Official sponsors
- (El Salvador) TBD – Official sponsors

== Current squad ==
As of 9 August 2025: Note: Flags indicate national team as defined under FIFA eligibility rules; some limited exceptions apply. Players may hold more than one non-FIFA nationality.

No.	Pos.	Nation	Player
2		ESA	Salvador Galindo (captain)
4		ESA	Obed Ochoa
8		ESA	Jefferson Garcia
9		ESA	Anthony Aguila
10		ESA	David Zayas
19		ESA	Osman Andrades
20		ESA	Ever Garcia
21		ESA	Henry Rodriguez
22	GK	ESA	Angel Joya
26		ESA	Atilio Rodriguez
29		ESA	Juan Saravia

No.	Pos.	Nation	Player
—		ESA	Caleb Zelaya
—		ESA	Jorge Zelaya
—		ESA	Juan Geovanny
—		ESA	
—		ESA	

=== Players with dual citizenship ===
- (El Salvador) (United States) Brandon Martinez-Trelles

=== Out on loan ===
Note: Flags indicate national team as defined under FIFA eligibility rules; some limited exceptions apply. Players may hold more than one non-FIFA nationality.

No.	Pos.	Nation	Player
—	MF	ESA	TBD (at TBD for the 2021-2022 season)
—	MF	ESA	TBD (at TBD for the 2021-2022 season)

No.	Pos.	Nation	Player
—	MF	ESA	TBD (at TBD for the 2021-2022 season)
—	MF	ESA	TBD (at TBD for the 2021-2022 season)

=== In ===
Note: Flags indicate national team as defined under FIFA eligibility rules; some limited exceptions apply. Players may hold more than one non-FIFA nationality.

No.	Pos.	Nation	Player
—		ESA	Joshua Alfaro (From Dragon)
—		ESA	Inmer Mancia (From Racing)
—		ESA	Brayan Martinez (From LA Firpo)
—		ESA	Eldin Aparicio (From Racing)

No.	Pos.	Nation	Player
—		ESA	Christian Salazar (From Racing)
—		ESA	TBD (From TBD)
—		ESA	TBD (From TBD)

=== Out ===
Note: Flags indicate national team as defined under FIFA eligibility rules; some limited exceptions apply. Players may hold more than one non-FIFA nationality.

No.	Pos.	Nation	Player
—		ESA	David Zayas (To El Roble)
—		ESA	TBD (To TBD)
—		ESA	TBD (To TBD)
—		ESA	TBD (To TBD)
—		ESA	TBD (To TBD)

No.	Pos.	Nation	Player
—		ESA	TBD (To TBD)
—		ESA	TBD (To TBD)
—		ESA	TBD (To TBD)

== Personal ==
=== Coaching staff ===
As of August 2025

Position	Staff
Manager	(El Salvador) Giovanni Trigueros (*)
Assistant Manager	(El Salvador) Miguel Obando
Reserve Manager	(El Salvador) Jhonny Funes
Goalkeeper Coach	(El Salvador) Carlos López Neves
Under 17 Manager	(El Salvador) TBD
Under 15 Manager	(El Salvador) TBD
Sporting Director	(El Salvador) Miguel Aguilar Obando
Fitness Coach	(El Salvador) Alberto Grande
Team Doctor	(El Salvador) Jose Ferrufino Flores (*)
Kinesiologist	(El Salvador) TBD
Utility	(El Salvador) TBD

== Managerial history ==
Name	Nationality	Tenure
Ranulfo Ayala	El Salvador	1965
Jose German Rivas	El Salvador	1981
Rafael Lozano	El Salvador	1998–1999
Rafael Ramírez	El Salvador	2002
Rafael Lozano	El Salvador	2003
TBD	El Salvador	TBD, 2017 – September, 2017
Jose Mario Martinez	El Salvador	September, 2017 – October, 2017
Omar Sevilla	El Salvador	October, 2017 – June, 2018
Giovanni Trigueros	El Salvador	June, 2018 – February, 2019
Miguel Aguilar Obando	El Salvador	February, 2019 – March 2019
Giovanni Trigueros	El Salvador	March, 2019 – June 2019
Victor Coreas	El Salvador	June, 2019 – December 2019
Nelson Mauricio Ancheta	El Salvador	January, 2020 – March, 2020
Manuel Carranza Murillo	El Salvador	May, 2020 – Present
Erasmo Lazo	El Salvador	March, 2022 – May, 2022
Juan Oficialdegui	Argentina	June, 2022 – October 2022
Rafael Lozano	El Salvador	October, 2022 – July, 2023
Eliseo Salamanca	El Salvador	August, 2023 – Present
Porfrio Aquiles	El Salvador	TBD – December 2024
Samael Vigil	El Salvador	January, 2025 – March 2025
Kilmar Jimenez	El Salvador	March, 2025 – August 2025
Giovanni Trigueros	El Salvador	August, 2025 – Present

=== Notable managers ===
The following managers have won at least one trophy while in charge at El Vencedor:

Name	Nationality	From	To	Honours
Giovanni Trigueros	El Salvador	1 June 2018	1 February 2019	1 Segunda División Salvadorean (2018 Apertura) 1 Promotional playoff (2018-2019)

== Club records ==
- First victory in the Primera Division for El Vencedor: 4-0 Once Deportivo, 25 August 2019
- First goalscorer in the Primera Division for El Vencedor: Panamanian Nicolás Muñoz v Isidro Metapan August 10, 2019
- Largest Home victory, Primera División: 2-0 v Alianza, 22 September 2019
- Largest Away victory, Primera División: 4-0 v Once Deportivo, 25 August 2019
- Largest Home loss, Primera División: 0-1 v Once Deportivo, 4 November 2019
- Largest Away loss, Primera División: 0–3 v Aguila, 28 July 2019
  1-4 FAS, 28 October 2019
- Highest home attendance: 3,215 v C.D. Aguila, Primera División, September 29, 2019
  2,000 v Platense, 2018, Segunda Division final
- Highest away attendance: 1,000 v Primera División, San Salvador, TBD, 2019
- Highest average attendance, season: 49,176, Primera División
- Most goals scored, season, Primera División: 28, TBD, 2019
- Worst season: Segunda Division 2002-2003: 1 loss, 4 draws and 17 losses (7 points)
- Biggest loss in History (and Tercera Division): 1- 14 Sal Y Mar, 20 October 2024
- Biggest loss in the Primera division: 0–3 v Aguila, 28 July 2019
- Biggest loss in the Segunda Division: 0–11 Nacional 1906 in 2006 Otra tunda para El Vencedor: 14 de noviembre 2005 .::. El Diario de Hoy

=== Individual records ===
- Record appearances (all competitions): TBD, 822 from 1957 to 1975
- Record appearances (Primera Division): Salvadoran Ramon Lopez and Reinaldo Aparicio, 32 from 2019
- Most capped player for El Salvador: 63 (0 whilst at El Vencedor), Juan Jose Gomez
- Most international caps for El Salvador while an El Vencedor player: 2, Henry Hernandez
- Most caps won whilst at El Vencedor: 2, Henry Hernandez.
- Record scorer in league: TBD, 396
- Most goals in a season (all competitions): TBD, 62 (1927/28) (47 in League, 15 in Cup competitions)
- Most goals in a season (Primera Division): Nicolás Muñoz, 19

==== Individual trophies ====
Nationality	First Name	Season	Number of Goals	Distinction Granted to the Player
El Salvador	David Zayas	Apertura 2025	22 (Goals)	Top League scorer (Tercera Division)
Panama	Nicolás Muñoz	Apertura 2019	19 (Goals)	Top League scorer (Primera Division)

== Notable former players ==
Players listed below have had junior and/or senior international caps for their respective countries before, while and/or after playing at El Vencedor.

- (El Salvador) Henry Hernandez
- (El Salvador) Juan Jose Polio
- (Panama) (El Salvador) Nicolás Muñoz
- (El Salvador) Sergio Mendez
- (El Salvador) Eduardo Vigil
- (El Salvador) Fabricio Alfaro
- (El Salvador) Christian Bautista
- (El Salvador) Styven Vasquez
