= 2026–27 Liga de Ascenso de El Salvador =

Liga de Ascenso de El Salvador
- Season: 2026–27
- Champions: Apertura 2026: TBD; Clausura 2027: TBD
- Relegated: TBD; TBD
- Matches: 56
- Goals: 129 (2.3 per match)
- Top goalscorer: Apertura 2026: TBD (TBD) (00 goals); Clausura 2027: TBD (TBD) (00 goals)
- Biggest home win: Apertura 2026: TBD 8–0 TBD (8 September 2026)
- Biggest away win: Apertura 2026: 1–6 (20 November 2026)
- Highest scoring: Apertura 2026: TBD 8–0 TBD (8 September 2026)
- Longest winning run: Apertura 2026: 5 matches TBD
- Longest unbeaten run: Apertura 2026: 9 matches
- Longest winless run: Apertura 2026: 16 matches
- Longest losing run: Apertura 2026: 10 matches
- Highest attendance: Apertura 2026: 3,465 (1 August 2026)
- Lowest attendance: Apertura 2026: 189 (19 August 2026)
- Stats are from the regular season only. Revision as of 22 May 2026.

The 2026–27 season Liga de Ascenso, officially known as TBD for sponsorship reasons, will be Liga de Ascenso de El Salvador very first season in the new format in which replaces the previous Segunda División de Fútbol Salvadoreño and Tercera Division de Fútbol Salvadoreño . This will be second highest level of El Salvador's football system. It was announced their will be no promotion or relegation for the next 2 years to give clubs a chance to stabilise.

== List of Teams ==
On July 16, 2026 FESFUT announced the 24 teams that met the prequistes

- Marte Soyapango
- Tenancingo
- AD Sesa
- CD Pumas
- Orión FC
- Independiente San Vicente
- Nacional FC
- Sal y Mar
- AD Academia BP
- San Marcos
- Izalco
- El Vencedor
- Audaz
- El Roble
- AD Forfut
- San Rafael
- Once Municipal
- Vendaval
- Fuerte Aguilares
- Olímpico Litoral
- Dragón
- Neo Pipil
- ADET-Aruba
- Once Lobos

== Notable events ==
=== Notable death from Apertura 2026 season and 2027 Clausura season ===
The following people associated with the Primera Division have died between the middle of 2026 and middle of 2027.

- TBD (ex TBD player)
- TBD (ex TBD coach)

== Managerial changes ==
=== Before the start of the season ===
Team	Outgoing manager	Manner of departure	Date of vacancy	Replaced by	Date of appointment	Position in table
Audaz	(El Salvador) Victor Coreas	Contract Ended	July 2026	(El Salvador) Ivan Ruiz	July 2026	TBD (2026 Clausura)
El Roble	(Uruguay) Rubén da Silva	Contract Ended	July 2026	(El Salvador) Efrain Burgos	July 2026	TBD (2026 Clausura)
Fuerte Aguilares	(El Salvador) Edgar Henriquez	Contract Ended	June 2026	(El Salvador) Frank Hernández	July 2026	TBD (2026 Clausura)
Once Municipal	(El Salvador) Mauricio Artero	Contract Ended	July 2026	(El Salvador) Jorge Abrego	July 2026	TBD (2026 Clausura)
Sal Y Mar	(Colombia) Gorge Chara	Contract Ended	June 2026	(El Salvador) Jose Manuel Romero	July 2026	TBD (2026 Clausura)
Tenancingo	(El Salvador) Ricardo García	Contract Ended	August 2026	(El Salvador) Alexi Guerra	August 2026	TBD (2026 Clausura)
Neo Pipil	(El Salvador) Manuel López	Contract Ended	July 2026	(El Salvador) David Hernandez	August 2026	TBD (2026 Clausura)
SESA	(Argentina) Julio Zamora	Contract Ended	July 2026	(El Salvador) Juan Alvarado	August 2026	TBD (2026 Clausura)
Olimpico Litoral	(El Salvador) Totti Pocasangre	Contract Ended	July 2026	(El Salvador) Alvaro Canizales	August 2026	TBD (2026 Clausura)

=== During the Apertura season ===
Team	Outgoing manager	Manner of departure	Date of vacancy	Replaced by	Date of appointment	Position in table
SESA	(El Salvador) Juan Alvarado	Mutual Consent	September 8,2026	(El Salvador) TBD	2026	th Centro Oriente (2026 Apertura)
El Roble	(El Salvador) Efrain Burgos	Sacked	September 16, 2026	(El Salvador) Omar Sevilla	September 2026	th Centro Oriente (2026 Apertura)
Izalco	(El Salvador) Alfredo Ramos	Mutual Consent	September 2026	(Colombia) Wilson Sánchez	September 2026	th Centro Oriente (2026 Apertura)
Vendaval	(El Salvador) Ulises Monge	Sacked	September 28, 2026	(El Salvador) Milton Meléndez	October 5, 2026	th Centro Oriente (2026 Apertura)
Fuerte Aguilares	(El Salvador) Frank Hernández	Sacked	November 2026	(El Salvador) Juan Cuellar	November 2026	th Centro Oriente (2026 Apertura)
TBD	(El Salvador) TBD	Mutual Consent	2026	(El Salvador) TBD	2026	th Centro Oriente (2026 Apertura)

=== Between the Apertura and Clausura season ===
Team	Outgoing manager	Manner of departure	Date of vacancy	Replaced by	Date of appointment	Position in table
TBD	(El Salvador) TBD	Sacked	January, 2027	(El Salvador) TBD	January 2027	th (2026 Apertura)
TBD	(El Salvador) TBD	Sacked	January, 2027	(El Salvador) TBD	January 2027	th (2026 Apertura)

=== During the Clausura season ===
Team	Outgoing manager	Manner of departure	Date of vacancy	Replaced by	Date of appointment	Position in table
TBD	(El Salvador) TBD	Sacked	March, 2027	(El Salvador) TBD	March, 2027	TBD
TBD	(El Salvador) TBD	Sacked	March, 2027	(El Salvador) TBD	March, 2027	TBD

== Apertura 2026 ==
=== Personnel and sponsoring ===
Team	Chairman	Head Coach	Captain	Foreign Player	Kitmaker	Shirt Sponsors
Academia BP	(El Salvador) TBD	(El Salvador) Justino Umaña	(El Salvador) TBD	(Colombia) Alvaro Castillo	TBD	DoradoBet, Electrolit, Madness
ADET-Aruba	(El Salvador) TBD	(El Salvador) Miguel Soriano	(El Salvador) TBD	(Colombia) TBD	TBD	Dorado Bet, Campos Truck, Cafe Altura, Movil, Electrolit
Audaz	(El Salvador) TBD	(El Salvador) Ivan Ruiz	(El Salvador) TBD	(Colombia) Harry de Jesus Alvardo Velasquez	TBD	Commercio Deras, DoradoBet, Electrolit
Dragón	(El Salvador) TBD	(El Salvador) Oswaldo Franco	(El Salvador) César Guevara	(Honduras) Jerrye Castillo	Tony Sports	Pollo Campestre, Dorado Bet, Hotel Marabella, CableSat
El Roble	(El Salvador) TBD	(El Salvador) Efrain Burgos	(El Salvador) Nicolas Pacheco	(Colombia) Victor Hinestroza	TBD	TBD
El Vencedor	(El Salvador) TBD	(El Salvador) Giovanni Trigueros	(El Salvador) TBD	(Colombia) TBD	TBD	Dorado Bet, Cablesat, MCG - Mario Construction Grupo,
Forfut	(El Salvador) TBD	(El Salvador) Vladimir Flores	(El Salvador) TBD	(Colombia) Neimer Miranda	Katty Sports	DoradoBet, Caja de Credito Ilobasco,Clinca Dental, Surti Telas, Electrolit, Transporte Duran
Fuerte Aguilares	(El Salvador) TBD	(El Salvador) Frank Hernández	(El Salvador) Diego Rivera	(Ecuador) Gabriel Montaño	TBD	Dorado Bet, Grupo Jiron, Bloque de la Pena, Transportes Marinita de la Cruz, Ominivision Canal 29
Independiente San Vicente	(El Salvador) TBD	(Colombia) Jaime Giraldo	(El Salvador) Diego Ascensio	(Colombia) Rafael Lopez	TBD	TBD
Izalco	(El Salvador) TBD	(El Salvador) Alfredo Ramos	(El Salvador) Balmore Mendez	(Colombia) Andru Palacios	Nil	DoradoBet, Electrolit, Laboratorio Clinco, RDC Rodriguez Construction ,BI.O. GEN
Marte Soyapango	(El Salvador) TBD	(El Salvador) Manuel Lopez	(El Salvador) TBD	(Colombia) Argenis Alba	TBD	TBD
Nacional FC	(Colombia) Julian Acevedo	(El Salvador) Lazaro Gutierrez	(El Salvador) Diego Lemus	(Colombia) TBD	Salguero Sports	DoradoBet, WEG, Municipal Sonsonate
Neo Pipil	(El Salvador) TBD	(El Salvador) David Hernandez	(Paraguay) Sandro Melgarejo	(Paraguay) Sandro Melgarejo	TBD	ED Martinez, Dorados Bet, La Vakita Colonial Sport News
Olímpico Litoral	(El Salvador) TBD	(El Salvador) Alvaro Canizales	(El Salvador) Juan Benitez	(Argentina) Gabriel Vega	TBD	GID - Grupo de Inversion Deportes, Dorados Bet
Once Lobos	(El Salvador) TBD	(El Salvador) Juan Carlos Moscoso	(El Salvador) Ivan Molina	(Colombia) TBD	TBD	Dorado Bet, Dinamarca Venta de Verduras, Constructora Y Terraceria Rodriguez Ramirez S.A. DE C.V.
Once Municipal	(El Salvador) TBD	(El Salvador) Jorge Abrego	(El Salvador) Michael López	(Colombia) Juan Navarrete	TBD	TBD
Orión FC	(El Salvador) TBD	(El Salvador) Ludwin Rivera	(El Salvador) TBD	(Colombia) TBD	TBD	Dorado Bet, Iglesia Vieja, Autoservicio, Electrolit
Sal y Mar	(El Salvador) TBD	(El Salvador) Juan Manuel Romero	(El Salvador) TBD	(Colombia) Daniel Moreno	TBD	Dorado Bet, Lesly Rent a car, Electorlit, Agua El Limon
San Marcos	(El Salvador) TBD	(El Salvador) José Lovato	(El Salvador) Cristian Merino	(Colombia) Polo Mosquera	TBD	TBD
San Rafael	(El Salvador) TBD	(El Salvador) Ever Aguirre	(El Salvador) TBD	(Nicaragua) David Obando	Mac Sport	Dorado Bet, Electrolit , Princesita
SESSA	(El Salvador) TBD	(El Salvador) Juan Alvarado	(El Salvador) TBD	(Ecuador) David Quinonez	TBD	Commerica Deras, Dorado Bet, Patricia Michell
Tenancingo	(El Salvador) TBD	(El Salvador) Alexi Guerra	(El Salvador) TBD	(Cuba) Samuel Caron	JP	Dorado Bet, Pichi rent a car
UES Pumas	(El Salvador) Joel Hernández	(El Salvador) Edgar Henriquez	(El Salvador) Elvin Alvarado	(Colombia) Juan Esteban Victoria	TBD	DoradoBet
Vendaval	(El Salvador) TBD	(El Salvador) Ulises Monge	(El Salvador) Jesús Marroquín	(Colombia) Sebastian Garzon	Koppa SportsWear	DoradoBet

=== Regular seasons ===
==== Centro Occidente ====
Pos	Team	Pld	W	D	L	GF	GA	GD	Pts	Qualification or relegation
1	Once Municipal	17	11	3	3	41	24	+17	36	Advance to Playoffs
2	Izalco	17	10	4	3	34	22	+12	34	Advance to Playoffs
3	CD Pumas	17	9	4	4	31	23	+8	31	Advance to Playoffs
4	El Roble	17	8	5	4	19	14	+5	29	Advance to Playoffs
5	Marte Soyapango	17	7	4	6	31	25	+6	25	
6	Nacional FC	17	7	4	6	19	15	+4	25	
7	Once Lobos	17	6	5	6	22	25	−3	23	
8	AD Forfut	17	6	3	8	30	29	+1	21	
9	ADET-Aruba	17	4	6	7	17	20	−3	18	
10	Academia BP	17	4	4	9	25	41	−16	16	
11	Vendaval	17	2	5	10	14	32	−18	11	
12	Fuerte Aguilares	17	1	7	9	18	31	−13	10	

Rules for classification: 1) points; 2) goal difference; 3) number of goals scored.

== Results ==
Home \ Away	ACA	ADE	ELR	FOR	FUA	IZA	NAC	ONC	MUN	PUM	SOY	VEN
Academia BP	—	-	0–3	2–1	2–1	4–2	1–3	2–3	3–3	2–2	-	0–0
ADET-Aruba	5–1	—	2–2	1–2	0–0	0–1	0–0	0–2	2–1	-	-	1–0
El Roble	-	1–0	—	4–2	-	2–0	0–0	0–0	0–2	1–0	1–0	1–2
AD Forfut	4–0	-	3–0	—	1–1	2–4	0–2	-	1–2	1–1	4–0	-
Fuerte Aguilares	-	-	0–0	2–2	—	0–2	0–1	-	1–1	2–3	1–1	3–0
Izalco	5–3	0–2	1–0	-	6–2	—	1–0	-	-	2–2	3–1	2–1
Nacional FC	1–1	2–1	0–1	-	-	0–0	—	2–1	2–3	-	0–2	4–0
Once Lobos	2–1	0–0	2–2	2–1	3–2	0–0	1–2	—	0–1	-	1–3	-
Once Municipal	-	3–0	-	4–3	3–1	1–3	2–0	3–1	—	1–0	-	6–1
CD Pumas	3–2	3–1	-	1–2	1–0	-	1–0	1–2	3–3	—	3–1	3–1
Marte Soyapango	3–0	0–0	-	3–0	4–1	2–2	-	4–1	3–2	1–2	—	2–2
Vendaval	0–1	2–2	0–1	0–1	1–1	-	-	1–1	-	1–2	2–1	—

Updated to match(es) played on ongoing. Source: []
Legend: Blue = home team win; Yellow = draw; Red = away team win.
For upcoming matches, an "a" indicates there is an article about the rivalry between the two participants.

==== Centro Oriente ====
Pos	Team	Pld	W	D	L	GF	GA	GD	Pts	Qualification or relegation
1	Independiente San Vicente	17	13	2	2	52	14	+38	41	Advance to Playoffs
2	Olímpico Litoral	17	9	4	4	38	24	+14	31	Advance to Playoffs
3	Sal y Mar	17	8	3	6	31	16	+15	27	Advance to Playoffs
4	El Vencedor	17	7	5	5	35	23	+12	26	Advance to Playoffs
5	San Marcos	17	7	5	5	27	28	−1	26	
6	Tenancingo	17	8	2	7	29	32	−3	26	
7	Dragon	17	6	7	4	31	27	+4	25	
8	Audaz	17	7	2	8	37	43	−6	23	
9	Neo Pipil	17	6	3	8	14	27	−13	21	
10	San Rafael	17	4	6	7	29	25	+4	18	
11	AD Sesa	17	5	3	9	43	55	−12	18	
12	Orión FC	17	1	0	16	17	69	−52	3	

Rules for classification: 1) points; 2) goal difference; 3) number of goals scored.

== Results ==
Home \ Away	AUD	DRA	VEN	IND	NEO	OLI	ORI	SAL	MAR	RAF	SES	TEN
Audaz	—	0–3	2–3	3–2	3–1	2–3	4–2	1–3	-	3–3	7–3	3–1
Dragon	-	—	3–2	2–2	2–0	1–1	3–2	0–0	7–1	3–2	1–1	-
El Vencedor	7–3	1–1	—	0–2	0–0	-	2–0	1–1	-	3–1	9–0	1–0
Independiente San Vicente	-	4–1	4–1	—	3–1	2–1	8–0	2–0	5–2	-	-	4–0
Neo Pipil	1–2	-	2–0	2–1	—	1–3	0–3	1–0	0–0	1–0	-	1–0
Olímpico Litoral	1–1	4–0	1–1	-	-	—	5–2	-	2–1	2–0	3–2	3–2
Orión FC	1–3	-	0–2	0–4	-	-	—	1–3	1–2	0–7	2–5	-
Sal y Mar	5–0	3–1	-	0–1	4–0	1–0	-	—	0–1	-	3–1	4–0
San Marcos	2–0	1–1	0–0	-	-	2–1	-	-	—	2–0	3–2	2–3
San Rafael	-	-	-	1–1	1–1	-	5–0	1–0	0–0	—	2–2	2–3
AD Sesa	-	-	-	0–5	4–0	3–3	7–2	4–3	4–2	2–3	—	2–4
Tenancingo	-	2–1	3–2	-	-	1–4	4–0	1–1	1–1	1–0	3–1	—

Updated to match(es) played on ongoing. Source: []
Legend: Blue = home team win; Yellow = draw; Red = away team win.
For upcoming matches, an "a" indicates there is an article about the rivalry between the two participants.

== Clausura 2027 ==
=== Personnel and sponsoring ===
Team	Chairman	Head Coach	Captain	Foreign Player	Kitmaker	Shirt Sponsors
Academia BP	(El Salvador) TBD	(El Salvador) TBD	(El Salvador) TBD	(Colombia) TBD	TBD	TBD
ADET-Aruba	(El Salvador) TBD	(El Salvador) TBD	(El Salvador) TBD	(Colombia) TBD	TBD	TBD
Audaz	(El Salvador) TBD	(El Salvador) TBD	(El Salvador) TBD	(Colombia) TBD	TBD	TBD
Dragón	(El Salvador) TBD	(El Salvador) TBD	(El Salvador) TBD	(Colombia) TBD	TBD	TBD
El Roble	(El Salvador) TBD	(El Salvador) TBD	(El Salvador) TBD	(Colombia) TBD	TBD	TBD
El Vencedor	(El Salvador) TBD	(El Salvador) TBD	(El Salvador) TBD	(Colombia) TBD	TBD	TBD
Forfut	(El Salvador) TBD	(El Salvador) TBD	(El Salvador) TBD	(Colombia) TBD	TBD	TBD
Fuerte Aguilares	(El Salvador) TBD	(El Salvador) TBD	(El Salvador) TBD	(Colombia) TBD	TBD	TBD
Independiente San Vicente	(El Salvador) TBD	(El Salvador) TBD	(El Salvador) TBD	(Colombia) TBD	TBD	TBD
Izalco	(El Salvador) TBD	(El Salvador) TBD	(El Salvador) TBD	(Colombia) TBD	TBD	TBD
Marte Soyapango	(El Salvador) TBD	(El Salvador) TBD	(El Salvador) TBD	(Colombia) TBD	TBD	TBD
Nacional FC	(El Salvador) TBD	(El Salvador) TBD	(El Salvador) TBD	(Colombia) TBD	TBD	TBD
Neo Pipil	(El Salvador) TBD	(El Salvador) TBD	(El Salvador) TBD	(Colombia) TBD	TBD	TBD
Olímpico Litoral	(El Salvador) TBD	(El Salvador) TBD	(El Salvador) TBD	(Colombia) TBD	TBD	TBD
Once Lobos	(El Salvador) TBD	(El Salvador) TBD	(El Salvador) TBD	(Colombia) TBD	TBD	TBD
Once Municipal	(El Salvador) TBD	(El Salvador) TBD	(El Salvador) TBD	(Colombia) TBD	TBD	TBD
Orión FC	(El Salvador) TBD	(El Salvador) TBD	(El Salvador) TBD	(Colombia) TBD	TBD	TBD
Sal y Mar	(El Salvador) TBD	(El Salvador) TBD	(El Salvador) TBD	(Colombia) TBD	TBD	TBD
San Marcos	(El Salvador) TBD	(El Salvador) TBD	(El Salvador) TBD	(Colombia) TBD	TBD	TBD
San Rafael	(El Salvador) TBD	(El Salvador) TBD	(El Salvador) TBD	(Colombia) TBD	TBD	TBD
SESSA	(El Salvador) TBD	(El Salvador) TBD	(El Salvador) TBD	(Colombia) TBD	TBD	TBD
Tenancingo	(El Salvador) TBD	(El Salvador) TBD	(El Salvador) TBD	(Colombia) TBD	TBD	TBD
UES Pumas	(El Salvador) TBD	(El Salvador) TBD	(El Salvador) TBD	(Colombia) TBD	TBD	TBD
Vendaval	(El Salvador) TBD	(El Salvador) TBD	(El Salvador) TBD	(Colombia) TBD	TBD	TBD

=== Regular seasons ===
==== Centro Occidente ====
Pos	Team	Pld	W	D	L	GF	GA	GD	Pts	Qualification or relegation
1	Academia BP	0	0	0	0	0	0	0	0	Advance to Playoffs
2	ADET-Aruba	0	0	0	0	0	0	0	0	Advance to Playoffs
3	El Roble	0	0	0	0	0	0	0	0	Advance to Playoffs
4	AD Forfut	0	0	0	0	0	0	0	0	Advance to Playoffs
5	Fuerte Aguilares	0	0	0	0	0	0	0	0	
6	Izalco	0	0	0	0	0	0	0	0	
7	Once Municipal	0	0	0	0	0	0	0	0	
8	Nacional FC	0	0	0	0	0	0	0	0	
9	Once Lobos	0	0	0	0	0	0	0	0	
10	CD Pumas	0	0	0	0	0	0	0	0	
11	Marte Soyapango	0	0	0	0	0	0	0	0	
12	Vendaval	0	0	0	0	0	0	0	0	

Rules for classification: 1) points; 2) goal difference; 3) number of goals scored.

==== Centro Oriente ====
Pos	Team	Pld	W	D	L	GF	GA	GD	Pts	Qualification or relegation
1	Audaz	0	0	0	0	0	0	0	0	Advance to Playoffs
2	Dragon	0	0	0	0	0	0	0	0	Advance to Playoffs
3	El Vencedor	0	0	0	0	0	0	0	0	Advance to Playoffs
4	Independiente San Vicente	0	0	0	0	0	0	0	0	Advance to Playoffs
5	Neo Pipil	0	0	0	0	0	0	0	0	
6	Olímpico Litoral	0	0	0	0	0	0	0	0	
7	Orión FC	0	0	0	0	0	0	0	0	
8	San Marcos	0	0	0	0	0	0	0	0	
9	San Rafael	0	0	0	0	0	0	0	0	
10	Sal y Mar	0	0	0	0	0	0	0	0	
11	AD Sesa	0	0	0	0	0	0	0	0	
12	Tenancingo	0	0	0	0	0	0	0	0	

Rules for classification: 1) points; 2) goal difference; 3) number of goals scored.

== Aggregate table ==
The Aggregate table is the general ranking for the 2025–26 season. This table is a sum of the Apertura 2025 and Clausura 2026 tournament standings. The aggregate table is used to determine the relegation to the Tercera División de El Salvador.
