= C.D. INCA-Aruba =

Salvadoran football club

Club Deportivo INCA Aruba ADET
- Full name: Club Deportivo INCA
- Founded: 1959
- Ground: Cancha Entre Rios, La Libertad
- Chairman: (El Salvador) Elmer Salazar
- Manager: (El Salvador) Héctor Salazar
- League: (El Salvador) Segunda División
Home colours	Away colours

Club Deportivo INCA are a Salvadoran professional football club based in Entre Rios, La Libertad, El Salvador.

The club changed their name to Club Deportivo INCA.

== History ==
They have played in the Salvadoran Second Division under the name Inca Super Flat until the 2006/2007 season.

Following their time in the second division, the club reverted their name back to Club Deportivo Inca.

Due to the violence in the region the club played in, Caused the club to suspend operations from 2015 until 2020.

In 2026, the club merged with ADET-Aruba to form Inca ADET-Aruba.

In the club first tournament under the INCA-Aruba name, under the leadership of manager Hector Salazar. The club finished first in the regular season standing before defeating Dragon 5-1 on aggregate and Atletico Balboa 3–2 on aggreate. They reached the final against Sensunte Cabañas, which they won 4-0 thanks to a double by Bryan Paz, David Gomez and Diego Urrutia.

On May 31, 2026 INCA-Aruba the Clausura 2026 champion defeated the Apertura 2025 Champion Atletico Balboa 4-2 on penalties after the match ended after extra time.

== Honours ==
=== Domestic honours ===
==== Leagues ====
- Segunda División Salvadorean and predecessors
  - Champion (1) :2026 Clausura
  - Promotion Play-off Winners (1): 2025-2026
- Tercera Division and predecessors
  - Champions (1): 1998
- La Asociación Departamental de Fútbol Aficionado' and predecessors (4th tier)
  - Champions (2): 1988, 2021
  - Play-off winner (2):

== Stadium ==
- Cancha de Entre Rios in Lourdes Colón, La Libertad(-2019; 2023-Present)
  - Estadio Las Delicias, Santa Tecla (2020)

INCA-Aruba plays its home games at Cancha de Entre Rios in Lourdes Colón, La Libertad. However the club stated the Cancha de Entre Rios was too small to play in the Primera Division therefore they moved their games to the bigger TBD.

== Sponsors ==
Companies that INCA-Aruba currently has sponsorship deals with for 2026–2027 includes:

- (El Salvador) TF Sports – Official kit suppliers
- (El Salvador) Gana 777 – Official sponsors
- (El Salvador) Therapy Gel – Official sponsors
- (El Salvador) Cafe Altura – Official sponsors
- (El Salvador) CODEZA de R.L. – Official sponsors
- (El Salvador) TBD – Official sponsors
- (El Salvador) TBD – Official sponsors

As of June 2026

Period	Kit Manufacturer	Shirt Sponsor	Sleeve Sponsor
2026–present	TF Sports	Gana 777, Therapy Gel, Cafe Altura, CODEZA de R.L.	Canal 4, Indes

== Current squad ==
As of August, 2026:
Note: Flags indicate national team as defined under FIFA eligibility rules; some limited exceptions apply. Players may hold more than one non-FIFA nationality.

No.	Pos.	Nation	Player
1	GK	SLV	Balmore Pineda
3		SLV	Cristopher Najano
4		SLV	Jaime Somoza
5		SLV	Armando Gomez
6	MF	SLV	Raymundo Cortez (captain)
7		SLV	Juan Fabricio Torres
8		SLV	Maynor Serafin
9		PAN	Aldair McKenzie
10		SLV	Marlon Consuegra
11		SLV	Bryan Paz
12	DF	SLV	Héctor Rodríguez
13		SLV	Carlos Herrera
14		SLV	Diego Urrutia
15		SLV	David Gomez
16		SLV	Fernando Quintanilla
17		SLV	William Lopez

No.	Pos.	Nation	Player
—		SLV	David Funes
18		PAN	Alberto Ramírez
20	DF	PAR	Mario Narváez
21		SLV	Eduardo Pinto
22		SLV	Ronaldo Molina
23		SLV	William Escobar
24		SLV	Cristopher Lopez
25		COL	Jhon Caicedo
27		SLV	Carlos Trujillo
31		SLV	Diego Velasquez
30	GK	SLV	Franco Chinchilla
34		SLV	Harol Ruiz

=== Players with dual citizenship ===
- (El Salvador) (United States) TBD

=== In ===
Note: Flags indicate national team as defined under FIFA eligibility rules; some limited exceptions apply. Players may hold more than one non-FIFA nationality.

No.	Pos.	Nation	Player
—	DF	PAR	Mario Narváez (From Free agent)
—	FW	PAN	Alberto Ramírez (From Águilas de la Universidad de Panamá)
—		SLV	Armando Gómez (From Free agent)
—	FW	PAN	Aldair McKenzie (From Universitario)
—		SLV	David Funes (From Free agent)
—		SLV	Ronaldo Molina (From Free agent)
—		COL	Jhon Caicedo (From Free agent)
—		COL	Jonatan Urrutia (From Isidro Metapan)

No.	Pos.	Nation	Player
—		SLV	Diego Velázquez (From Free agent)
—	GK	SLV	Balmore Pineda (From Free agent)
—		SLV	Cristopher Maldonado (From Free agent)
—		SLV	William Escobar (From Free agent)
—		SLV	Eduardo Pinto (From Free agent)
—		SLV	Juan Barahona (From Alianza)
—		SLV	Carlos Anzora (From Isidro Metapan)
—		SLV	Ivan Mancia (From Hércules)

=== Out ===
Note: Flags indicate national team as defined under FIFA eligibility rules; some limited exceptions apply. Players may hold more than one non-FIFA nationality.

No.	Pos.	Nation	Player
—		COL	Jose Medrano (To TBD)
—		SLV	TBD (To TBD)
—		SLV	TBD (To TBD)
—		SLV	TBD (To TBD)
—		SLV	TBD (To TBD)

No.	Pos.	Nation	Player
—		SLV	TBD (To TBD)
—		SLV	TBD (To TBD)
—		SLV	TBD (To TBD)

== Coaching staff ==
As of June 2026

Position	Staff
Manager	(El Salvador) Alcides Salazar
Assistant manager	(El Salvador) Jaime Medina
Physical coach	(El Salvador) Gerardo Quintanilla
Goalkeeper coach	(El Salvador) David Aguilar (El Salvador) Mauricio Huezo
Video Analyst	(El Salvador) Carlos Alvarenga
Kineslogic	(El Salvador)
Utility equipment	(El Salvador)
Football director	(El Salvador) Héctor Alcides Salazar
Team doctor	(El Salvador) Wendy Rodriguez
Team Psychologist	(El Salvador) Ramiro Carballo

== Former coaches ==
- (El Salvador) Alcides Salazar (1993–2003, 2024-Present)
- Hiatus (2015-2020)
- (El Salvador) Héctor Alcides Salazar (2022-2024)

== Other departments ==
=== Football ===
==== Reserve team ====
The reserve team serves mainly as the final stepping stone for promising young players under the age of 21 before being promoted to the main team. The second team is coached by Mario Pablo Quintanilla. the team played in the Primera División Reserves. It plays its home matches at TBDe, adjacent to the first teams and women's team.

Name	Nat	Tenure	Notes
Mario Pablo Quintanilla	(El Salvador)	June 2026 - Present	N/A

=== Current squad ===
As of: June, 2026 Note: Flags indicate national team as defined under FIFA eligibility rules; some limited exceptions apply. Players may hold more than one non-FIFA nationality.

No.	Pos.	Nation	Player
—		SLV	TBD
—		SLV	TBD
—		SLV	TBD
—		SLV	TBD
—		SLV	TBD

No.	Pos.	Nation	Player
—		SLV	TBD
—		SLV	TBD
—		SLV	TBD
—		SLV	TBD
—		SLV	TBD

==== Junior teams ====
The youth team (under 17 and under 15) has produced some of El Salvador's top football players, including TBD and TBD. It plays its home matches at TBD, adjacent to the first team's ground, and it is coached by Alexis Urbina (under 17), Raul Grande (Under 15) and Hever Vladimir (Under 13). The team will participate for the first time in 2026 Apertura.

Name	Nat	Tenure
Eduardo Lara Moscote	(El Salvador)	June 2026 - Present

=== Current squad ===
As of: June, 2026 Note: Flags indicate national team as defined under FIFA eligibility rules; some limited exceptions apply. Players may hold more than one non-FIFA nationality.

No.	Pos.	Nation	Player
—		SLV	TBD
—		SLV	TBD
—		SLV	TBD
—		SLV	TBD
—		SLV	TBD

No.	Pos.	Nation	Player
—		SLV	TBD
—		SLV	TBD
—		SLV	TBD
—		SLV	TBD
—		SLV	TBD

==== Women's team ====
The women's first team, which is led by head coach Alan Roman. They will participate for the first time in the primera division for the Apertura 2026.

Name	Nat	Tenure
Alan Romano	(El Salvador)	June 2026 - Present

=== Current squad ===
As of: June, 2026 Note: Flags indicate national team as defined under FIFA eligibility rules; some limited exceptions apply. Players may hold more than one non-FIFA nationality.

No.	Pos.	Nation	Player
—		SLV	TBD
—		SLV	TBD
—		SLV	TBD
—		SLV	TBD
—		SLV	TBD
—		SLV	TBD
—		SLV	TBD (Captain)
—		SLV	TBD
—		SLV	TBD
—		SLV	TBD

No.	Pos.	Nation	Player
—		SLV	TBD
—		SLV	TBD
—		SLV	TBD }

=== In ===
Note: Flags indicate national team as defined under FIFA eligibility rules; some limited exceptions apply. Players may hold more than one non-FIFA nationality.

No.	Pos.	Nation	Player
—		SLV	TBD (From TBD)
—		SLV	TBD (From TBD)
—		SLV	TBD (From TBD)
—		SLV	TBD (From TBD)
—		SLV	TBD (From TBD)

No.	Pos.	Nation	Player
—		SLV	TBD (From TBD)
—		SLV	TBD (From TBD)
—		SLV	TBD (From TBD)
—		SLV	TBD (From TBD)
—		SLV	TBD (From TBD)

=== Out ===
Note: Flags indicate national team as defined under FIFA eligibility rules; some limited exceptions apply. Players may hold more than one non-FIFA nationality.

No.	Pos.	Nation	Player
—		SLV	TBD (To TBD)
—		SLV	TBD (To TBD)
—		SLV	TBD (To TBD)

No.	Pos.	Nation	Player
—		SLV	TBD (To TBD)
—		SLV	TBD (To TBD)
—		SLV	TBD (To TBD)
