= 2025–26 Segunda División de El Salvador =

Segunda División de Fútbol Salvadoreño
- Season: 2025–26
- Champions: Apertura 2025: Atletico Balboa; Clausura 2026: INCA-Aruba
- Promoted: INCA-Aruba
- Relegated: CD Pipil; Espartano
- Matches: 56
- Goals: 129 (2.3 per match)
- Top goalscorer: Apertura 2025: Santos Guzman (Sensunte Cabañas FC) (13 goals); Clausura 2026: Nelson Paredes (Neo Pipil) (10 goals)
- Biggest home win: Apertura 2025: Titan 8–0 Cangrejera (8 September 2025)
- Biggest away win: Apertura 2025: 1–6 (20 November 2025)
- Highest scoring: Apertura 2025: Titan 8–0 Cangrejera (8 September 2025)
- Longest winning run: Apertura 2025: 5 matches Titan
- Longest unbeaten run: Apertura 2025: 9 matches
- Longest winless run: Apertura 2025: 16 matches
- Longest losing run: Apertura 2025: 10 matches
- Highest attendance: Apertura 2025: 3,465 (1 August 2025)
- Lowest attendance: Apertura 2025: 189 (19 August 2025)
- Stats are from the regular season only. Revision as of 20 January 2026.

The 2025–26 season Liga de Plata, officially known as Copa Electrolit for sponsorship reasons, will be El Salvador's Segunda División de Fútbol Salvadoreño. The season will be split into two championships Apertura 2025 and Clausura 2026. The champions of the Apertura and Clausura play the direct promotion playoff every year. The winner of that series ascends to Primera División de Fútbol de El Salvador.

== Changes to the 2025–26 seasons ==
Teams promoted to 2025–26 Primera División de El Salvador

- Zacatecoluca F.C.

Teams relegated to Segunda División de Fútbol Salvadoreño - Apertura 2025

- Nil

Teams relegated to Tercera Division de Fútbol Salvadoreño - Apertura 2025

- Nil

Teams promoted from Tercera Division de Fútbol Salvadoreño - Apertura 2025

- CD Talleres Jr. (Apertura 2024/Clausura 2025 Champion)
- CD Neo Pipil (Clausura 2025 Champion/Playoff Winner)
- Sensunte Cabañas FC (Aggregate table best team not yet qualified)
- AD Juventud Independiente (Aggregate table second-best team not yet qualified)
- CD Pipil (Aggregate table third-best team not yet qualified)

New Teams or teams that purchased a spot in the Segunda division

- CD Aruba (Purchase spot from FC Los Laureles)
- CD Dragón (Purchase spot from Once Lobos)
- Atletico Balboa (Purchased spot from AD Brasilia)

Teams that failed to register for the Apertura 2025

- FC Los Laureles (Sold their spot to CD Aruba)
- Once Lobos (Sold their spot to CD Dragón)
- Brasilia (Sold their spot to Atlético Balboa)
- Titan
- Cangrejera FC
- Tiburones de Sonsonate

== Notable events ==
=== ADET-Aruba Merger with CD INCA ===
On December 5, 2025, it was announced on both teams' social media pages that ADET-Aruba and INCA would merge for the 2026 Clausura season and be known as INCA-ADET Aruba.

=== Notable death from Apertura 2025 season and 2026 Clausura season ===
The following people associated with the Primera Division have died between the middle of 2025 and middle of 2026.

- Rene Ubau (ex Neo Pipil player)
- Óscar Eduardo Amaya (ex Pipil coach)
- Rene Alexander Rodriguez Mendoza (ex Platense player)
- Juan Pastor Montiel (ex Dragon and Charito Juniors player)
- Tony Maravilla (ex Platense player)

== Managerial changes ==
=== Before the start of the season ===
Team	Outgoing manager	Manner of departure	Date of vacancy	Replaced by	Date of appointment	Position in table
Atletico Balboa	Nil	Contract Ended	2025	(El Salvador) Carlos Romero	July 2025	Return from Hiatus (2025 Clausura)
Cruzeiro	(El Salvador) Ivan Ruiz	Contract Ended	June 2025	(El Salvador) Alexi Guerra	June 2025	2nd and Semi-finalist (2025 Clausura)

=== During the Apertura season ===
Team	Outgoing manager	Manner of departure	Date of vacancy	Replaced by	Date of appointment	Position in table
TBD	(El Salvador) TBD	Mutual Consent	2025	(El Salvador) TBD	2025	th Centro Oriente (2025 Apertura)
Talleres Jr	(El Salvador) Efraín Burgos	Mutual consent	August 2025	(El Salvador) Ricardo Serrano	August 2025	th Grupo A (2025 Apertura)
ADET-Aruba	(El Salvador) Miguel Soriano	Mutual Consent	August 2025	(Uruguay) Rubén da Silva	August 2025	3rd Grupo A (2025 Apertura)
Espartano	(El Salvador) Wilber Aguilar	Sacked	September 2025	(El Salvador) Ennio Mendoza	October 2025	th Grupo A (2025 Apertura)

=== Between the Apertura and Clausura season ===
Team	Outgoing manager	Manner of departure	Date of vacancy	Replaced by	Date of appointment	Position in table
Fuerte Aguilares	(El Salvador) Rafael "lito" Mariona	Mutual Consent	December 2025	(El Salvador) Jorge Abrego	December 2025	1st and Quarterfinalist (2025 Apertura)
Cruzeiro	(El Salvador) Alexi Guerra	Contract Finished	December 2025	(El Salvador) Guillermo Rivera	December 2025	1st and Semifinalist (2025 Apertura)
Olímpico Litoral	(Argentina) Ángel Piazzi	Mutual consent	December 2025	(El Salvador) Totti Pocasangre	December 2025	5th (2025 Apertura)
Talleres Jr	(El Salvador) Ricardo Serrano	Sacked	January 5, 2026	(El Salvador) Balmore Gomez	January 2026	th (2025 Apertura)
AD Destroyer	Nil	New club	January 5, 2026	(El Salvador) Efren Marceno	January 12, 2026	New Club
Dragon	(El Salvador) Marvin Benitez	Sacked	January, 2026	(El Salvador) Oswaldo Franco	January 2026	th (2025 Apertura)
Pipil	(El Salvador) Ciro Romero	Sacked	January, 2026	(El Salvador) Marvín Rosales	January 2026	th (2025 Apertura)

=== During the Clausura season ===
Team	Outgoing manager	Manner of departure	Date of vacancy	Replaced by	Date of appointment	Position in table
TBD	(El Salvador) TBD	Sacked	March, 2026	(El Salvador) TBD	March, 2026	TBD
Talleres Jr	(El Salvador) Balmore Gomez	Sacked	January __, 2026	(El Salvador) Adonay Salinas	January __, 2026	TBD
Fuerte Aguilares	(El Salvador) Jorge Abrego	Sacked	February, 2026	(El Salvador) Edgar Henríquez	February, 2026	TBD
Batanecos	(El Salvador) Roberto Antonio Hernández	Sacked	February, 2026	(El Salvador) Miguel Soriano	February, 2026	TBD

== Apertura 2025 ==
=== Personnel and sponsoring ===
Team	Chairman	Head Coach	Captain	Foreign Player	Kitmaker	Shirt Sponsors
ADET-Aruba	(El Salvador) TBD	(El Salvador) Miguel Soriano	(El Salvador) Nicolas Pacheco	(Colombia) Johni Moran	SPORTFINE	Centro Surille, Gespron, ww.desorden.ca
Atletico Balboa	(El Salvador) TBD	(El Salvador) Carlos Romero	(El Salvador) Gabriel Alvarez	(Colombia) Manuel Murillo	Huriver	AMSEB, Alcadia de La Union Sur
Batanecos	(El Salvador) TBD	(El Salvador) Roberto Antonio Hernández	(El Salvador) Douglas Rivas	(Colombia) Victor Hinestroza	Galaxia	Acodjar, Guiliane Construction, Electrolit
Cruzeiro	(El Salvador) TBD	(El Salvador) Ivan Ruiz	(Colombia) Tardelis Peña	(Colombia) Tardelis Peña	PS Sports	Agua Inmaculada, Electrolit
Dragon	(El Salvador) TBD	(Uruguay) Pablo Quiñones	(El Salvador) Luis Mendez	(Colombia) Yerson Tobar	Tony Sports	Pollo Campestre, Cablesat, Diparvel, Electrolit
Espartano	(El Salvador) Saul Alfaro	(El Salvador) Wilber Aguilar	(El Salvador) Balmore Mendez	(Colombia) Bryan Obregon	MACA	MC Carpenters, Farmacia San Jose
Fuerte Aguilares	(El Salvador) TBD	(El Salvador) Rafael Mariona	(El Salvador) Diego Rivera	(Colombia) Bladimir Diaz	Arjam Sports	Grupo Jiran, Bloques de la pena, CFG clear freight group
INCA	(El Salvador) TBD	(El Salvador) Héctor Salazar	(El Salvador) Raymundo Cortez	(El Salvador) TBD	Asda Sport	Asisa, Codeza de RL, Electrolit
Juventud Independiente	(El Salvador) TBD	(El Salvador) Juan Ramon Sanchez	(El Salvador) Carlos Garcia	(Colombia) José Medrano	Nil	DIGILIFE, BarRanko, Electrolit
Neo Pipil	(El Salvador) TBD	(El Salvador) Manuel Lopez	(El Salvador) Jose Monterrosa	(Colombia) Argenis Alba	Tony Sports	ED Martinez, Dental Infinity
Olímpico Litoral	(El Salvador) Ignacio Juarez	(Argentina) Ángel Piazzi	(El Salvador) Antonio Larios	(Colombia) Luis Caicedo	Galaxia	Loma Larga, JMA complete restoration, Electrolit, INDES
Pipil	(El Salvador) TBD	(El Salvador) Ciro Romero	(El Salvador) TBD	(Brazil) Paulo Silva	Diseño Sport	Pollo Campestre, Century 21, Electrolit, Transportes Argueta
Sensunte Cabañas	(El Salvador) TBD	(El Salvador) Hugo Delgado	(El Salvador) Santos Guzman	(Colombia) Marlon Viafara	Katty Sports	CrediViajes, Liberty State, Concinita de MamaMila
Talleres Jr	(El Salvador) TBD	(El Salvador) Efraín Burgos	(El Salvador) Cesar Chevez	(El Salvador) TBD	Arjam Sports	Plaza Don Yon, Gravablock, Electrolit, Marina

=== Regular seasons ===
==== Group A ====
Pos	Team	Pld	W	D	L	GF	GA	GD	Pts	Qualification or relegation
1	Fuerte Aguilares	16	8	5	3	19	17	+2	29	Advance to Playoffs
2	Talleres Jr	14	5	5	4	22	18	+4	20	Advance to Playoffs
3	Batanecos	14	4	6	4	16	18	−2	18	Advance to Playoffs
4	ADET-Aruba	14	4	4	6	16	15	+1	16	Advance to Playoffs
5	INCA	14	4	4	6	15	19	−4	16	
6	Juventud Independiente	10	5	1	4	15	19	−4	16	
7	Espartano	14	4	3	7	15	23	−8	15	

Rules for classification: 1) points; 2) goal difference; 3) number of goals scored.

==== Centro Occidente ====
Pos	Team	Pld	W	D	L	GF	GA	GD	Pts	Qualification or relegation
1	Cruzeiro	14	6	6	2	19	12	+7	24	Advance to Playoffs
2	Sensunte Cabañas	14	7	3	4	24	19	+5	24	Advance to Playoffs
3	Dragon	14	6	3	5	27	24	+3	21	Advance to Playoffs
4	Balboa	14	5	6	3	18	15	+3	21	Advance to Playoffs
5	Olímpico Litoral	14	4	6	4	16	18	−2	18	
6	Pipil	14	4	5	5	18	21	−3	17	
7	Neo Pipil	14	3	4	7	20	22	−2	13	

Rules for classification: 1) points; 2) goal difference; 3) number of goals scored.

== Top scorers ==
Pos	Player	Team	Goals
1.	(El Salvador) Santos Guzman	Sensunte Cabañas	12
2.	(Colombia) Yerson Tobar	Dragon	9
3.	(El Salvador) Bryan Alas	INCA	8
4.	(El Salvador) Edgar Cruz	Balboa	8
5.	(El Salvador) Rolando Molina	Neo Pipil	7

== Finals ==
=== Quarter-finals ===
November 2, 2025
14:30

ADET-Aruba	1-0	Cruzeiro
Bryan Ortega		Nil

Cancha Hacienda El Transito, Talnique, La Libertad Department

November 9, 2025

Cruzeiro	1-0	ADET-Aruba
Edgar Valladares		Nil

Estadio jiboa, San Vicente

1-1 on aggregate. Cruzeiro won 7–6 on penalties.

November 2, 2025
15:00

Batanecos	3-0	Sensunte Cabañas
Fernando Villalta 37'; David Argutea 66'; Victor Hinestroza 70'		Nil

Estadio Juan Francisco Molina, San Sebastian, San Vicente Department

November 9, 2025

Sensunte Cabañas	2-1	Batanecos
Santos Guzman 3'; Kevin Garcia 31'		Vladimir Figueroa 20'

Polideportivo Sensuntepeque, Sensuntepeque

Batanecos won 4–2 on aggregate.

November 2, 2025
15:00

Atletico Balboa	3-1	Fuerte Aguilares
Edgar Cruz (pen.), 15' 50'; Manuel Murillo 80'		Bryan Erazo

Estadio Marcelino Imbers, La Union, La Unión Department

November 9, 2025

Fuerte Aguilares	1-1	Atletico Balboa
Bladimir Diaz 37'		Manuel Murillo 43'

Complejo Deportivo Mario Jovel, Aguilares

Atletico Balboa won 4–2 on aggregate.

November 2, 2025
15:00

Dragon	1-1	Talleres Jr
Luis Aguilar		Juan Perez 47'

Estadio Juan Francisco Barraza, San Miguel, San Miguel Department

November 2025
15:00

Talleres Jr	1-2	Dragon
Juan Gil		Yerson Tobar 11' 52'

Estadio José Gregorio Martínez, Chalatenango

Dragon won 3–2 on aggregate.

=== Semi-finals ===
November 16, 2025
15:00

Atletico Balboa	2-1	Batanecos
Jan Carlos Cruz; Manuel Murillo	[]	Robertillo Rivera

Marcelino Imbers Stadium, La Unión

November 23, 2025
15:30 pm

Batanecos	1-1	Atletico Balboa
TBD	[]	Carlos Hernandez 21'

Estadio Juan Francisco Molina, San Sebastián, San Vicente

Atletico Balboa won 3–2 on aggregate.

November 16, 2025
15:00

Dragon	0-1	Cruzeiro
Nil	[]	Isai Aguilar

Estadio Municipal de Chapeltique, Chapeltique, San Miguel Department

November 23, 2025

Cruzeiro	0-5	Dragon
Nil	[]	Zuriel Melendez; Yerson Tobar

Estadio Jiboa, San Vicente
Referee: Giovanni Zamora

Dragon won 6–0 on aggregate.

=== Final ===
November 29, 2025

Atletico Balboa	2-1	Dragon
Miguel Murillo (pen.), 20' 44'		Luis Méndez 7'

Estadio Jose Ramon Flores, Santa Rosa de Lima
Referee: José Waldir García

Apertura 2025 champions

3rd title

=== Individual awards ===
Hombre GOL	Best Goalkeeper Award
(El Salvador) Santos Guzman; Sensunte Cabañas	(El Salvador) TBD; TBD

== Clausura 2026 ==
=== Personnel and sponsoring ===
Team	Chairman	Head Coach	Captain	Foreign Player	Kitmaker	Shirt Sponsors
AD Destroyer	(El Salvador) TBD	(El Salvador) Efrén Marenco	(El Salvador) TBD	(El Salvador) TBD	TBD	TBD
Aruba-ADET Inca	(El Salvador) TBD	(El Salvador) Alcides Salazar	(El Salvador) TBD	(El Salvador) TBD	TBD	Gesproin, Codesa de R.L, Cafe Altura, Clinca Medica Familiar R & E, TE rental
Balboa	(El Salvador) TBD	(El Salvador) Carlos Romero	(El Salvador) TBD	(Colombia) Manuel Murillo	Huriver	Alcaldia de La Union Sur; CAMSEB;
Batanecos	(El Salvador) Manrique Alfaro	(El Salvador) Roberto Antonio Hernández	(El Salvador) TBD	(Colombia) Victor Hinestroza	Galaxia	Acodjar, Guiliane Construction,
Cruzeiro	(El Salvador) TBD	(El Salvador) Guillermo Rivera	(Colombia) Tardelis Peña	(Colombia) Tardelis Peña	PS Sports	Electrolit; Agua Inmaculada.com
Dragon	(El Salvador) TBD	(El Salvador) Oswaldo Franco	(El Salvador) TBD	(Colombia) Yerson Tobar	Tony Sports	Pollo Campestre, Cablesat, Iparvel, Centro Pediatrico, Chicharonari Y Carricara
Espartano	(El Salvador) TBD	(El Salvador) Ennio Mendoza	(El Salvador) Enrique Deleon	(El Salvador) TBD	Maca	Electrolit, JMC Carpenters, Farmacia San Jose
Fuerte Aguilares	(El Salvador) TBD	(El Salvador) Jorge Abrego	(El Salvador) TBD	(Colombia) Bladimir Diaz	Arijam Sports	Jiron, Transporte Marnita de la Cruz, Bloques de la Pena
Juventud Independiente	(El Salvador) TBD	(El Salvador) Juan Ramon Sanchez	(El Salvador) TBD	(Colombia) Cristian Caicedo	TBD	Digilife, RC Parada, Lelasa, Agrocentro de Opico, Sobreqosa
Neo Pipil	(El Salvador) TBD	(El Salvador) Manuel López	(El Salvador) TBD	(Colombia) Argenis Alba	Arijam Sports	Inversiones Crediahorro de RL; Dental Inanity, P de la Pena, ED Martinez
Olímpico Litoral	(El Salvador) TBD	(El Salvador) Totti Pocasangre	(El Salvador) Juan Benitez	(Colombia) Duban Andrade	Galaxia	Loma Larga, JMA Complete Restorations, Electrolit, INDES
Pipil	(El Salvador) TBD	(El Salvador) Marvin Rosales	(El Salvador) TBD	(El Salvador) TBD	Diseño Sport	Pollo Campestre, TR, Century 21
Sensunte Cabañas	(El Salvador) TBD	(El Salvador) Hugo Delgado	(El Salvador) Santos Guzman	(El Salvador) TBD	Katty Sports	Liberty State Insurance, Credit Viaja, La Casona, Clinica Dental, Tu Familia, Cartagena Landscapiong, La concina de mama mila,
Talleres Jr	(El Salvador) TBD	(El Salvador) Balmore Gomez	(El Salvador) Cesar Chevez	(El Salvador) TBD	Arijam Sports	Plaza Don Yon, Eletcrolit, Chalatenango Country Club, Gravablock,

=== Regular seasons ===
==== Group A ====
Pos	Team	Pld	W	D	L	GF	GA	GD	Pts	Qualification or relegation
1	INCA	14	6	6	2	21	17	+4	24	Advance to Playoffs
2	Juventud Independiente	14	6	2	6	19	17	+2	20	Advance to Playoffs
3	Fuerte Aguilares	14	5	5	4	12	11	+1	20	Advance to Playoffs
4	C.D. Destroyer	13	5	4	4	20	22	−2	19	Advance to Playoffs
5	Batanecos	14	4	6	4	9	10	−1	18	
6	Talleres Jr	14	3	6	5	11	12	−1	15	
7	Espartano	14	2	6	6	10	15	−5	12	

Rules for classification: 1) points; 2) goal difference; 3) number of goals scored.

==== Grpup B ====
Pos	Team	Pld	W	D	L	GF	GA	GD	Pts	Qualification or relegation
1	Neo Pipil	14	6	6	2	24	14	+10	24	Advance to Playoffs
2	Balboa	14	5	6	3	17	18	−1	21	Advance to Playoffs
3	Sensunte Cabañas	14	4	8	2	16	15	+1	20	Advance to Playoffs
4	Dragon	14	5	3	6	19	21	−2	18	Advance to Playoffs
5	Olímpico Litoral	14	4	4	6	18	14	+4	16	
6	Cruzeiro	14	4	4	6	15	19	−4	16	
7	Pipil	14	4	4	6	22	28	−6	16	

Rules for classification: 1) points; 2) goal difference; 3) number of goals scored.

== Top scorers ==
Pos	Player	Team	Goals
1.	(El Salvador) Nelson Paredes	Neo Pipil	10
2.	(El Salvador) Santos Guzman	Sensunte Cabañas	7
3.	(Colombia) Yerson Tobar	Dragon	7
4.	(El Salvador) Meyson Ascensio	Olímpico Litoral	7
5.	(El Salvador) Bryan Paz	INCA-Aruba	7

== Finals ==
=== Conference quarter-finals ===
April 26, 2026
14:30

Dragon	1-2	INCA-ADET-ARUBA
Luis Mendez		TBD; TBD

Estadio Juan Francisco Barraza, San Miguel

May 1, 2026
14:30

INCA-ADET-ARUBA	3-0	Dragon
Bryan Paz; Harold Ruiz; Marlon Consuegra		Nil

Cancha San Isdro, Entre Rios, Colon

INCA-ADET-ARUBA won 5–1 on aggregate.

April 26, 2026
15:00

Fuerte Aguilares	0-0	Atletico Balboa
Nil		Nil

Estadio José Gregorio Martínez, Chalatenango

May 3, 2026
15:00

Atletico Balboa	2-0	Fuerte Aguilares
Ángel Reyes 23'; Edgar Cruz 70'		Nil

Estadio Marcelino Imbers, La Union

Atletico Balboa won 2–0 on aggregate.

April 26, 2026
14:30

Destroyer	0-1	Neo Pipil
Nil		Jose Monterrosa

Cancha Chilama, Puerto de La Libertad

May 3, 2026
14:30

Neo Pipil	1-1	Destroyer
Nelson Paredes 53'		TBD

Estadio Neo Pipil, San Juan Nonualco

Neo Pipil won 2–1 on aggregate.

April 26, 2026

Sensunte Cabañas	4-2	Juventud Independiente
Yimi Velasco 24'; Santos Guzman 31' 33' 83'		Jesus Ochoa 47' 53'

Polideportivo Sensuntepeque, Sensuntepeque

May 3, 2026
14:30

Juventud Independiente	1-0	Sensunte Cabañas
Jesus Ochoa 12'		Nil

Complejo Deportivo San Juan Opico, San Juan Opico

Sensunte Cabañas won 4–3 on aggregate.

=== Conference semi-finals ===
May 9, 2026
15:00

Sensunte Cabañas	0-0	Neo Pipil
Nil	[]	Nil

Polideportivo de Sensuntepeque, Sensuntepeque, Cabanas

May 17, 2026
14:00

Neo Pipil	1-1	Sensunte Cabañas
Ronaldo Molina	[]	Santos Guzman

Estadio Neo Pipil, San Juan Nonualco

1-1. Sensunte Cabañas won 4–3 on penalties.

May 10, 2026
14:00

Atletico Balboa	0-1	INCA-ADET-ARUBA
Nil	[]	Bryan Paz 35'

Estadio Marcelino Imbers, La Union

May 16, 2026
14:00

INCA-ADET-ARUBA	2-2	Atletico Balboa
Bryan Paz 25'; Diego Martínez 120'	[]	Edgar Cruz 58'; Orlando Martinez 87'

Cancha San isidro Entre Rios

INCA-ADET-ARUBA won 3–2 on aggregate.

=== Final ===
May 24, 2026
17:00

INCA-Aruba	4-0	Sensunte Cabañas
Bryan Paz 7' (pen.), 22'; David Gomez 46'; Diego Martinez 70'		Nil

Estadio Las Delicias, Santa Tecla
Referee: Cesar Nolasco

Clausura 2026 champions

1st title

== Relegation Aggregate table ==
The Aggregate table is the general ranking for the 2025–26 season. This table is a sum of the Apertura 2025 and Clausura 2026 tournament standings. The aggregate table is used to determine the relegation to the Tercera División de El Salvador.

=== Group A ===
Pos	Team	Pld	W	D	L	GF	GA	GD	Pts	
1	Fuerte Aguilares	28	11	10	7	31	28	+3	43	
2	INCA	28	10	10	8	36	36	0	40	
3	Batanecos	28	8	12	8	25	28	−3	36	
4	Talleres Jr	28	8	11	9	33	30	+3	35	
5	C.D. Destroyer	28	9	8	11	36	37	−1	35	
6	Juventud Independiente	28	9	8	11	34	36	−2	35	
7	Espartano	28	6	9	13	25	38	−13	27	Relegated to Tercera División de El Salvador

Rules for classification: 1) points; 2) goal difference; 3) number of goals scored.

=== Grpup B ===
Pos	Team	Pld	W	D	L	GF	GA	GD	Pts	
1	Sensunte Cabañas	28	11	11	6	40	34	+6	44	
2	Balboa	28	10	12	6	35	33	+2	42	
3	Cruzeiro	28	10	10	8	34	31	+3	40	
4	Dragon	28	11	6	11	46	45	+1	39	
5	Neo Pipil	28	9	10	9	44	36	+8	37	
6	Olímpico Litoral	28	8	10	10	34	32	+2	34	
7	Pipil	28	8	9	11	40	49	−9	33	Relegated to Tercera División de El Salvador

Rules for classification: 1) points; 2) goal difference; 3) number of goals scored.

== Promotion Play-offs ==
31 May 2026
14:00

Atletico Balboa	1-1	INCA-Aruba
Edgar Cruz 48'		Diego Urrutia 81'

Estadio Universitario (UES), San Salvador

1-1. INCA-Aruba won 4–2 on penalties
