= C.D. San Marcos de Jiquilisco =

Association football club in El Salvador

- Full name: Club Deportivo San Marcos de Jiquilisco
- Founded: 1960
- Ground: Cancha de San Marcos; Jiquilisco, Usulután department, El Salvador
- Chairman: (El Salvador) Silvia Salmeron
- Manager: (El Salvador) Ever Aguirre
- League: Liga de Ascenso
- Grupo Centro Oriente A, 4th
Home colours	Away colours

Club Deportivo San Marcos de Jiquilisco is a Salvadoran professional football club based in Jiquilisco, Usulután department, El Salvador.

The club currently plays in the Liga de Ascenso.

== Honours ==
=== Domestic honours ===
==== Leagues ====
- Tercera División de Fútbol Salvadoreño and predecessors
  - Champions (2) : N/A
  - Play-off winner (2):
- La Asociación Departamental de Fútbol Aficionado' and predecessors (4th tier)
  - Champions - Usulutan Department (1) : 2022-23
  - Play-off winner (2):

== Current squad ==
Note: Flags indicate national team as defined under FIFA eligibility rules; some limited exceptions apply. Players may hold more than one non-FIFA nationality.

No.	Pos.	Nation	Player
1	GK	SLV	Anderson Chavez
4		SLV	Atilio Rodriguez
5		SLV	Uziel Morales
7		SLV	Jonathan Rodriguez
8		SLV	Jason Mejia
9		SLV	Nelson Gaitan
10		SLV	Josue Alexander Cruz
11		SLV	Anderson Castellanos
12	FW	SLV	Cristian Merino
14		COL	Polo Mosquera
16		SLV	Obeb Ochoa
17		SLV	Fabio Diaz

No.	Pos.	Nation	Player
18		SLV	Diego Hernandez
19		SLV	Henry Montesino
20		SLV	Lionel Quintanilla
21		SLV	Josue Ibanes
22		SLV	Alexi Quintanilla
23		SLV	Walter Machado
25		SLV	Cristian Martinez
26		SLV	Jose Velasquez
29		SLV	Juan Saravia
30	GK	SLV	Angel Ricardo Valencia

=== Players with dual citizenship ===
- (El Salvador) (United States) TBD

=== In ===
Note: Flags indicate national team as defined under FIFA eligibility rules; some limited exceptions apply. Players may hold more than one non-FIFA nationality.

No.	Pos.	Nation	Player
—		SLV	Bryan Molina (From Neo Pipil)
—		SLV	Atilio Rodriguez (From El Vencedor)
—		SLV	Obeb Ochoa (From Brazil FC)
—		SLV	Diego Hernandez (From Firpo Reserva)
—		SLV	Fabio Diaz (From Racing)
—		SLV	Juan Saravia (From Audaz)
—		SLV	Uziel Morales (From Mar y Plata)
—		SLV	Alexi Quintanilla (From LA Firpo)
—		COL	Polo Mosquera (From INDES Cabanas)
—		SLV	Anderson Chavez (From SESA)
—		SLV	Jason Mejia (From Vencedor)

No.	Pos.	Nation	Player
—		SLV	Walter Machado (From Firpo Reserva)
—		SLV	Nelson Gaitan (From Palo Galan)
—		SLV	Jonathan Rodriguez (From Palo Galan)
—		SLV	Henry Montesino (From Mata de Pina)
—		SLV	Jose Velasquez (From TBD)
—		SLV	Cristian Martinez (From Usuluteco)
—		SLV	Lionel Quintanilla (From Escuelita de Topiltzin)
—		SLV	TBD (From TBD)

=== Out ===
Note: Flags indicate national team as defined under FIFA eligibility rules; some limited exceptions apply. Players may hold more than one non-FIFA nationality.

No.	Pos.	Nation	Player
—		SLV	TBD (To Tony Maravilla)
—		SLV	TBD (To Kerin Perlera)
—		SLV	TBD (To Eddy Valle)
—		SLV	TBD (To TBD)

No.	Pos.	Nation	Player
—		SLV	TBD (To TBD)
—		SLV	TBD (To TBD)
—		SLV	TBD (To TBD)

== Personnel ==
=== Management ===
Position	Staff
Owner	
President	(El Salvador) Anderson Henriquez
Vice-President	(El Salvador)
Team-Representative	(El Salvador)

=== Coaching staff ===
As of August 2025

Position	Staff
Coach	(El Salvador) Sebastian Hernández
Assistant coach	(El Salvador) Ever Alejo
Fitness coach	(El Salvador)
Goalkeeper coach	(El Salvador) Héctor Sigaran

== List of coaches ==
- (El Salvador) Hijimo Menjívar (2021)
- (El Salvador) Jaime Jungbluth (2023)
- (El Salvador) Efrain Solano (2023 - May 2025)
- (El Salvador) Sebastián Hernández (June 2025 - Present)
