= Liga de Ascenso de El Salvador =

- Founded: 2026; 0 years ago
- Country: El Salvador
- Confederation: CONCACAF
- Number of clubs: 24
- Level on pyramid: 2
- Promotion to: Primera División
- Relegation to: REDFUT
- Domestic cup: Copa El Salvador
- Current champions: TBD (2025 Apertura)
- Most championships: TBD (0 titles)
- Broadcaster: Fox (Latin America)
- Website: Official website
- Current: 2026–27 Liga de Ascenso

The Liga de Ascenso de Fútbol de El Salvador or Liga de Ascenso for short —also known as Copa Fox for sponsorship reasons— is a professional association football league in El Salvador and the second highest level of the El Salvador football league system. Contested by 24 clubs, it operates on a system of promotion and relegation with the Primera División de El Salvador.

The competition was founded as the Liga de Ascenso on 7 May 2026, following the decision of FESFUT to fold Segunda Division and Tercera Division. The Federation then decided to select 24 clubs from the two leagues based on a list of pre-requisites. The successful 24 clubs were announced 16 July, 2026.

== History ==
Following disappointment on the international and club level, FESFUT president Yamil Bukele announced the creation of The Liga de Ascenso de Futbol de El Salvador to replace Segunda Division and Tercera Division. The new league will feature 24 teams and for the next two years their will be no promotion, to allow stability in both division.

The league held its first season in 2026. The 24 inaugural members of the new Liga de Ascenso were:

- Marte Soyapango
- Tenancingo
- AD Sesa
- CD Pumas
- Orión FC
- Independiente San Vicente
- Nacional FC
- Sal y Mar
- AD Academia BP
- San Marcos
- Izalco
- El Vencedor
- Audaz
- El Roble
- AD Forfut
- San Rafael
- Once Municipal
- Vendaval
- Fuerte Aguilares
- Olímpico Litoral
- Dragón
- Neo Pipil
- AD Aruba FC
- Once Lobos
