= A.D. Tenancingo =

Salvadoran football club

- Full name: Asociacion Deportiva Tenancingo
- Ground: Cancha Hacienda El Transito, El Salvador
- League: Liga de Ascenso
Home colours

Asociacion Deportiva Tenancingo is a Salvadoran football club based in Tenancingo, Cuscatlan, El Salvador.

The club currently plays in the Liga de Ascenso.

== Honours ==
=== Domestic honours ===
==== Leagues ====
- Tercera División Salvadorean and predecessors
  - Champions (2) : N/A
  - Play-off winner (2):
- La Asociación Departamental de Fútbol Aficionado and predecessors (4th tier)
  - Champions (1): Cuscatlan Department 2023–2024
  - Play-off winner (2):

== Current squad ==
As of: August 2026 Note: Flags indicate national team as defined under FIFA eligibility rules; some limited exceptions apply. Players may hold more than one non-FIFA nationality.

No.	Pos.	Nation	Player
—		SLV	TBD
—		SLV	TBD
—		SLV	TBD
—		SLV	TBD
—		SLV	TBD

No.	Pos.	Nation	Player
—		SLV	TBD
—		SLV	TBD
—		SLV	TBD
—		SLV	TBD
—		SLV	TBD

=== In ===
Note: Flags indicate national team as defined under FIFA eligibility rules; some limited exceptions apply. Players may hold more than one non-FIFA nationality.

No.	Pos.	Nation	Player
—		CUB	Samuel Caron (From TBD)
—	GK	SLV	Miguel Fuentes (From Batanecos)
—		SLV	Ulises Alvarado (From TBD)
—		SLV	Diego Morales (From TBD)
—		SLV	Jonathan Hernandez (From TBD)
—		SLV	Isau=ias Funetes (From TBD)

No.	Pos.	Nation	Player
—		SLV	Stanley Zepeda (From UD Santos)
—		SLV	TBD (From TBD)
—		SLV	TBD (From TBD)

=== Out ===
Note: Flags indicate national team as defined under FIFA eligibility rules; some limited exceptions apply. Players may hold more than one non-FIFA nationality.

No.	Pos.	Nation	Player
—		SLV	TBD (To TBD)
—		SLV	TBD (To TBD)
—		SLV	TBD (To TBD)
—		SLV	TBD (To TBD)

No.	Pos.	Nation	Player
—		SLV	TBD (To TBD)
—		SLV	TBD (To TBD)
—		SLV	TBD (To TBD)
—		SLV	TBD (To TBD)

== Coaching staff ==
As of August 2026

Position	Staff
Manager	(El Salvador) Alexi Guerra
Assistant manager	(El Salvador) Walter Casco
Physical coach	(El Salvador) TBD
Goalkeeper coach	(El Salvador) TBD
Kineslogic	(El Salvador) TBD
Utility equipment	(El Salvador) TBD
Football director	(El Salvador) TBD
Team doctor	(El Salvador) TBD

== List of coaches ==
- (El Salvador) Willie Rene Miranda
- (El Salvador) Ricardo García (September 2024-August 2026)
- (El Salvador) Alexi Guerra (August 2026 -Present)
