= Juan Barahona =

Juan Barahona may refer to:

- Juan Barahona (footballer) (born 1996), Salvadoran footballer
- Juan Barahona (judoka) (born 1978), Ecuadorian judoka
- Juan Barahona (sailor) (born 1961), Chilean sailor
- Juan Barahona Zapata del Águila (1578–1632), Spanish-born Nicaraguan Catholic bishop
