= A.D. San Rafael Obrajuelo =

Association football club in El Salvador

San Rafael Obrajuelo
- Full name: Asociación Deportiva San Rafael
- Ground: Estadio José Borjas Castillo; San Rafael Obrajuelo, San Salvador department, El Salvador
- Manager: (El Salvador) Ever Aguirre
- League: Liga de Ascenso
- Clausura 2012: Grupo Centro Oriente A, 4th
Home colours	Away colours

Asociación Deportiva San Rafael is a Salvadoran professional football club based in San Rafael Obrajuelo, San Salvador department, El Salvador.

The club currently plays in the Liga de Ascenso.

== Honours ==
=== Domestic honours ===
==== Leagues ====
- Tercera División de Fútbol Salvadoreño and predecessors
  - Champions (2) : N/A
  - Play-off winner (2):
- La Asociación Departamental de Fútbol Aficionado' and predecessors (4th tier)
  - Champions (1):
  - Play-off winner (2):

== Current squad ==
Note: Flags indicate national team as defined under FIFA eligibility rules; some limited exceptions apply. Players may hold more than one non-FIFA nationality.

No.	Pos.	Nation	Player
—		SLV	Abraham López
—		SLV	José Molina
—		SLV	Gustavo Martínez
—		SLV	Marlon Lara
—		SLV	Irvin Caridad
—		SLV	Nelson Mendoza
—		SLV	

No.	Pos.	Nation	Player
—		SLV	
—		SLV	
—		SLV	
—		SLV	
—		SLV	
—		SLV	

=== Players with dual citizenship ===
- (El Salvador) (United States) TBD

=== In ===
Note: Flags indicate national team as defined under FIFA eligibility rules; some limited exceptions apply. Players may hold more than one non-FIFA nationality.

No.	Pos.	Nation	Player
—	GK	SLV	Alexis Navarro (From El Vencedor)
—	MF	SLV	Jesus Canenguez (From Las Garzas)
—	DF	SLV	Miguel Cruz (From Aspirantes)
—	DF	SLV	Irvin Caridad (From Academia BP)
—	FW	SLV	Nelson Mendoza (From Guadalupe FC)
—	FW	SLV	Mario Guardado (From Cangrejera FC)
—	GK	SLV	Jostin Excobar (From CD Rosarense)

No.	Pos.	Nation	Player
—		SLV	Raul Rosales (From Zacatecoluca sub-17)
—		SLV	TBD (From TBD)
—		SLV	TBD (From TBD)

=== Out ===
Note: Flags indicate national team as defined under FIFA eligibility rules; some limited exceptions apply. Players may hold more than one non-FIFA nationality.

No.	Pos.	Nation	Player
—		SLV	Joel Aviles (To TBD)
—		SLV	Cesar Flores (To TBD)
—		SLV	Enrique Garcia (To TBD)
—		SLV	TBD (To TBD)

No.	Pos.	Nation	Player
—		SLV	TBD (To TBD)
—		SLV	TBD (To TBD)
—		SLV	TBD (To TBD)

== List of coaches ==
- (El Salvador) Ever Aguirre
