= A.D. Izalco =

Association football club in El Salvador

- Full name: Asociación Deportiva Izalco
- Ground: Estadio Salvador Mariona, El Salvador
- League: Liga de Ascenso
Home colours	Away colours

Asociación Deportiva Izalco is a Salvadoran football club based in Izalco, Sonsonate Department, El Salvador.

The club currently plays in the Liga de Ascenso.

== Honours ==
=== Domestic honours ===
==== Leagues ====
- Tercera División Salvadorean and predecessors
  - Champions (1) : 2026 Clausura (Centro-Occidental)
  - Runners-up (1): Apertura 2025 (Centro-Occidental)
  - Play-off winner (1): 2025-2026
- La Asociación Departamental de Fútbol Aficionado and predecessors (4th tier)
  - Champions (1): Sonsonate Department 2023–2024
  - Play-off winner (2):

== Current squad ==
As of: August 2026 Note: Flags indicate national team as defined under FIFA eligibility rules; some limited exceptions apply. Players may hold more than one non-FIFA nationality.

No.	Pos.	Nation	Player
1	GK	ESA	José Daniel Martínez Aguilar
2	DF	ESA	Matthew Alegre
4	DF	ESA	Balmore Mendez (Captain)
5	FW	ESA	Erick Toba
6	MF	ESA	Diego Medina
7	FW	ESA	Bryan Moran
8	MF	ESA	Gerson Martinez
9	FW	ESA	Kevin Leonor
10	MF	COL	Andru Palacios
11	MF	ESA	Kevin Meléndez
12	MF	ESA	Jonathan Leonor
14	MF	ESA	Diego Barillas

No.	Pos.	Nation	Player
15	MF	ESA	Harry Ramírez
16	MF	ESA	Ronald Aguilar Ortega
17	MF	ESA	Jorge Figueroa
19	DF	ESA	Arnulfo Paredes
21	DF	ESA	Walter Santos
22	DF	ESA	Ricardo Armas
23	DF	ESA	Orlando de León
25	GK	ESA	Luis Ernesto Chamagua Noyola
26	DF	ESA	Salvador Salazar
28	GK	ESA	Moisés Ernesto Portillo Consuegra

=== Players with dual citizenship ===
- (El Salvador) (United States) Zander Tidwell

=== In ===
Note: Flags indicate national team as defined under FIFA eligibility rules; some limited exceptions apply. Players may hold more than one non-FIFA nationality.

No.	Pos.	Nation	Player
—		ESA	Zander Tidwell (From TBD)
—		ESA	Kevin Leonor (From Espartano)
—		ESA	TBD (From TBD)

No.	Pos.	Nation	Player
—		ESA	TBD (From TBD)
—		ESA	TBD (From TBD)
—		ESA	TBD (From TBD)

=== Out ===
Note: Flags indicate national team as defined under FIFA eligibility rules; some limited exceptions apply. Players may hold more than one non-FIFA nationality.

No.	Pos.	Nation	Player
—		ESA	TBD (To TBD)
—		ESA	TBD (To TBD)
—		ESA	TBD (To TBD)
—		ESA	TBD (To TBD)
—		ESA	TBD (To TBD)

No.	Pos.	Nation	Player
—		ESA	TBD (To TBD)
—		ESA	TBD (To TBD)
—		ESA	TBD (To TBD)

== Personnel ==
=== Current technical staff ===
As of September, 2025

Position	Name
Manager	(Colombia) Wilson Sánchez
Assistant manager	(El Salvador) Cesar Rivas
Goalkeeping coach	(El Salvador) TBD
Fitness coach	(El Salvador) TBD
Club Doctor	(El Salvador) TBD
knesliogiocal	(El Salvador) TBD
Utility	(El Salvador) TBD

== List of coaches ==
- (El Salvador) TBD
- (El Salvador) Jose Alfredo Portillo (July 2024 - September 2026)
- (Colombia) Wilson Sánchez (September 2026 - Present)
