= C.F. Marte Soyapango =

Association football club in El Salvador

CF Marte Soyapango
- Full name: Clube Futbol Marte Soyapango
- Founded: 2023
- Ground: Cancha Jorgito Melendez; Soyapango, San Salvador Department, El Salvador
- Capacity: 1,000
- Chairman: Cristian Rafael Velásquez
- Manager: (El Salvador) Daniel Bonilla
- League: Liga de Ascenso
- Grupo Centro Occidente A, 4th
Home colours	Away colours

Clube Futbol Marte Soyapango is a Salvadoran professional football club based in Soyapango, San Salvador Department, El Salvador.

The club currently plays in the Liga de Ascenso.

== Honours ==
=== Domestic honours ===
==== Leagues ====
- Tercera División Salvadorean and predecessors
  - Champions (2) : N/A
  - Play-off winner (2):
- La Asociación Departamental de Fútbol Aficionado' and predecessors (4th tier)
  - Champions (1):
  - Play-off winner (2):

== List of players ==
- 1 César Chinchilla
- 2 Hugo Martínez
- 3 Bryan Galdamez
- 4 Diego López
- 5 César Cruz
- 6 Lorenzo Inglés
- 7 Edwin segura
- 8 Jimmy Vigil
- 9 Carlos Arieta
- 14 Fredis Hernández
- 15 Michael Pleitez
- 19 Rafael Medina
- 21 Salvador Sibrian
- 23 Alejandro Ortega
- 25 Daniel Aguilar
- 27 Junior Iglesias
- 28 Carlos Ortiz
- 29 Rodolfo Orellana
- 30 Maximiliano Lopez

== Current squad ==
Note: Flags indicate national team as defined under FIFA eligibility rules; some limited exceptions apply. Players may hold more than one non-FIFA nationality.

No.	Pos.	Nation	Player
—		SLV	TBD
—		SLV	TBD
—		SLV	TBD
—		SLV	TBD
—		SLV	TBD

No.	Pos.	Nation	Player
—		SLV	TBD
—		SLV	TBD
—		SLV	TBD

=== Players with dual citizenship ===
- (El Salvador) (United States) TBD

=== In ===
Note: Flags indicate national team as defined under FIFA eligibility rules; some limited exceptions apply. Players may hold more than one non-FIFA nationality.

No.	Pos.	Nation	Player
—		SLV	TBD (From TBD)
—		SLV	TBD (From TBD)
—		SLV	TBD (From TBD)
—		SLV	TBD (From TBD)

No.	Pos.	Nation	Player
—		SLV	TBD (From TBD)
—		SLV	TBD (From TBD)
—		SLV	TBD (From TBD)

=== Out ===
Note: Flags indicate national team as defined under FIFA eligibility rules; some limited exceptions apply. Players may hold more than one non-FIFA nationality.

No.	Pos.	Nation	Player
—		SLV	TBD (To TBD)
—		SLV	TBD (To TBD)
—		SLV	TBD (To TBD)
—		SLV	TBD (To TBD)

No.	Pos.	Nation	Player
—		SLV	TBD (To TBD)
—		SLV	TBD (To TBD)
—		SLV	TBD (To TBD)

== List of coaches ==
- (El Salvador) Nelson Cañenguez
- (El Salvador) Daniel Bonilla (TBD-Present)
- (El Salvador) Lazaro Gutierrez (June 2025 -Present)
