= Sensunte Cabañas F.C. =

Sensunte Cabañas
- Full name: Sensunte Cabañas Fútbol Club
- Ground: Polideportivo Sensuntepeque, El Salvador
- Manager: Hugo Delgado
- League: Segunda División Salvadorean
- 2026 Clausura: and runners up
Home colours

Sensunte Cabañas F.C. is a Salvadoran football club based in Sensuntepeque, Cabañas, El Salvador.

The club currently plays in the Tercera Division de Fútbol Salvadoreño after purchasing a spot.

== Honours ==
=== Domestic honours ===
==== Leagues ====
- Segunda División Salvadorean and predecessors
  - Runners up (1) :2026 Clausura
- Tercera División Salvadorean and predecessors
  - Champions (2) : N/A
  - Play-off winner (2):
- La Asociación Departamental de Fútbol Aficionado' and predecessors (4th tier)
  - Champions (1):
  - Play-off winner (2):

== Current squad ==
As of: July 2025 Note: Flags indicate national team as defined under FIFA eligibility rules; some limited exceptions apply. Players may hold more than one non-FIFA nationality.

| No. | Pos. | Nation | Player |
|---|---|---|---|
| 1 | GK | SLV | Miguel Ramirez |
| 3 | | SLV | Ever Pineda |
| 4 | | SLV | Williams Posada |
| 5 | | SLV | Jericho Ayala |
| 7 | | SLV | Moris Martínez |
| 8 | | SLV | Wilmer Pineda |
| 10 | | SLV | Jose Orellana |
| 11 | | SLV | Kevin Garcia |

| No. | Pos. | Nation | Player |
|---|---|---|---|
| 12 | | SLV | Walter Lara |
| 15 | | SLV | Yimi Velasco |
| 17 | | SLV | Alexis Amaya |
| 19 | | SLV | Manuel Arias |
| 20 | | SLV | Miguel Urias |
| 22 | | SLV | Sebastian Zavala |
| 27 | | SLV | Kevin Viscarra |
| 30 | | SLV | Santos Guzman (captain) |

=== Players with dual citizenship ===
- (El Salvador) (United States) TBD

=== In ===
Note: Flags indicate national team as defined under FIFA eligibility rules; some limited exceptions apply. Players may hold more than one non-FIFA nationality.

| No. | Pos. | Nation | Player |
|---|---|---|---|
| — | FW | SLV | Santos Guzman (From Cruzeiro) |
| — | DF | SLV | Williams Posada (From Cacahuatique) |
| — | MF | SLV | Kevin Lopez (From Cruzeiro) |
| — | | SLV | Miguel Ramirez (From Audaz) |
| — | | SLV | Jonathan Alas (From Santiagueno F.C.) |

| No. | Pos. | Nation | Player |
|---|---|---|---|
| — | | SLV | Steven Lara (From Forfut de Ilobasco) |
| — | | SLV | Manuel Arias (From Forfut de Ilobasco) |
| — | | SLV | Honorio Mercado (From Batanecos) |
| — | | SLV | Geovanny Molina (From Cruzeiro) |
| — | | COL | Marlon Viafara (From TBD) |

=== Out ===
Note: Flags indicate national team as defined under FIFA eligibility rules; some limited exceptions apply. Players may hold more than one non-FIFA nationality.

| No. | Pos. | Nation | Player |
|---|---|---|---|
| — | | SLV | David Aldana (To El Roble de Ilobasco) |
| — | | SLV | TBD (To TBD) |
| — | | SLV | TBD (To TBD) |

| No. | Pos. | Nation | Player |
|---|---|---|---|
| — | | SLV | TBD (To TBD) |
| — | | SLV | TBD (To TBD) |
| — | | SLV | TBD (To TBD) |

== List of coaches ==
- (El Salvador)
- (El Salvador) Roberto Villalobos (-December 2023)
- (El Salvador) Omar Sevilla (December 2023-December 2024)
- (El Salvador) Hugo Delgado (December 2024-present)
