= C.D. Talleres Jr =

Association football clubin El Salvador

- Full name: Club Deportivo Talleres Jr
- Founded: 1980; 46 years ago, as Club Deportivo JEMCO; 1993; 33 years ago, as Club Deportivo Talleres
- Ground: Cancha José Pío Romero Bosque; Tejutla, Chalatenango, El Salvador
- Chairman: (El Salvador) Walter López
- Manager: (El Salvador) Efraín Burgos
- League: Tercera Division de Fútbol Salvadoreño
Home colours	Away colours

Club Deportivo Talleres Jr is a Salvadoran professional football club based in Tejutla, Chalatenango, El Salvador.

The club currently plays in the Tercera Division de Fútbol Salvadoreño.

== History ==
The club founded in 1980 under the name of Club Deportivo JEMCO under the leadership of Julio Escobar Molina y Compañía, Miguel Martínez and Ramon Martínez, the club spent the initial years playing in San Salvador and competing in fútbol aficionado. However, once one of their founders and financial backer v departed the club. The club hit financial trouble and due to issue they were not permitted to use their original name and were forced to use Club Deportivo JEMCO Jr. from 1990 until 1992.

The club reached their first final in the tercera division, however they lost 2-1 Turin FESA in the 2014 Apertura season.

The club won its second Tercera title (2025 Clausura) defeating Santiagueno 4-2 on aggregate, as this was their second title in one year, the club won automatic promotion to the Segunda division for the 2025-2026 seasons.

== Honours ==
=== Domestic honours ===
==== Leagues ====
- Tercera División de Fútbol Salvadoreño and predecessors
  - Champions (2) : Apertura 2024, Clausura 2025
  - Runner-up (3) : Apertura 2014, 2023 Apertura, Clausura 2024
  - Play-off winner (2):
- La Asociación Departamental de Fútbol Aficionado' and predecessors (4th tier)
  - Champions (1):
  - Play-off winner (2):

== Colours, kits and sponsorship ==
=== Uniform evolution ===
- Primary

2024–	2025 -Present

- Alternate

2024-2025	2025–

== Stadium ==
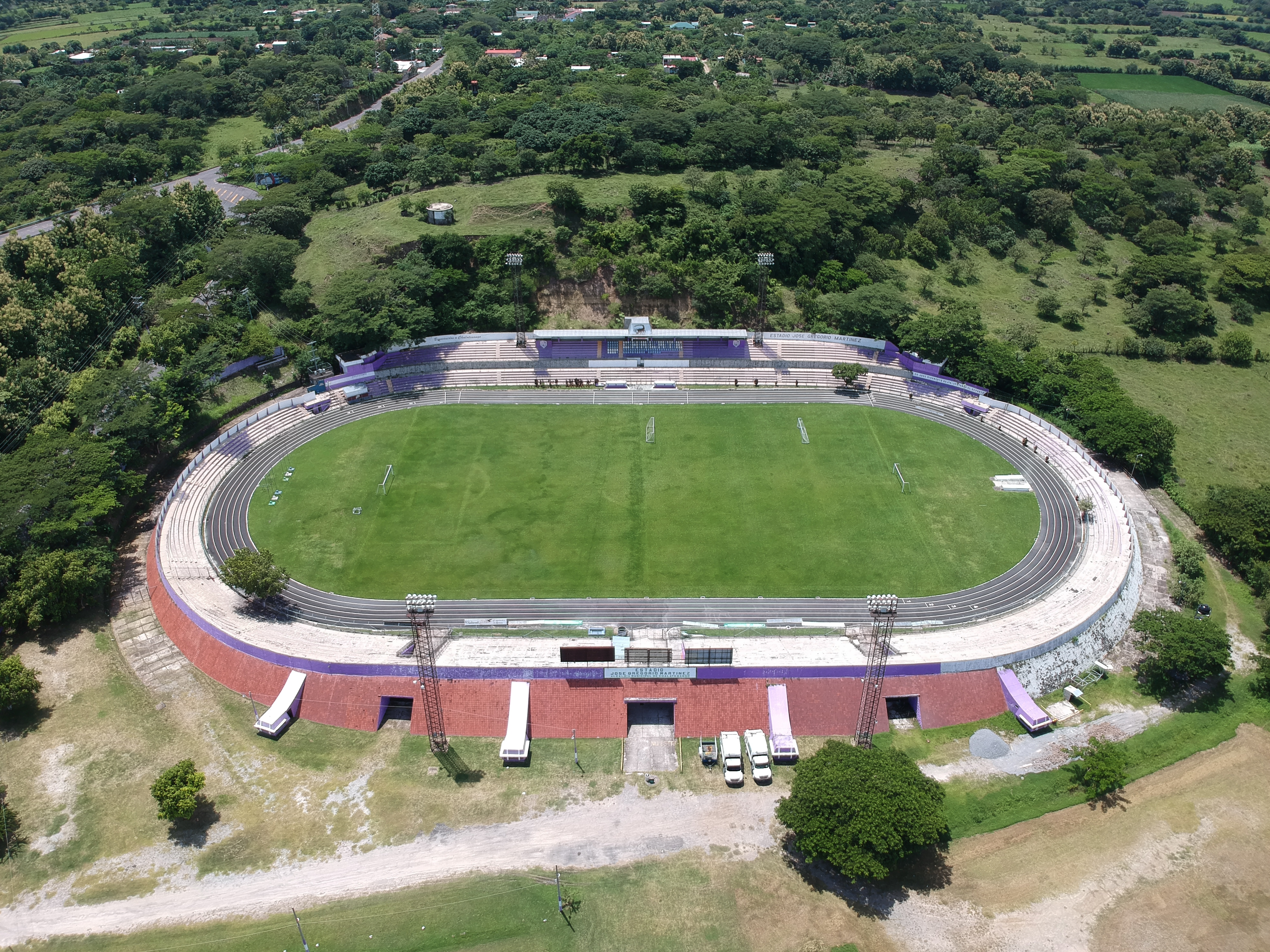
Estadio José Gregorio Martínez panoramic view of the stadium

Name	Location	Years in use
Estadio José Gregorio Martínez	Chalatenango	2025 – present
TBD	TBD	2003; 1 game in U.S. Open Cup
TBD	TBD	2007–present

Talleres Jr plays its home games at Estadio José Gregorio Martínez in Chalatenango. The Estadio José Gregorio Martínez is a 15,000-seat soccer-specific stadium.

== Current squad ==
As of: January 2026 Note: Flags indicate national team as defined under FIFA eligibility rules; some limited exceptions apply. Players may hold more than one non-FIFA nationality.

No.	Pos.	Nation	Player
1	GK	SLV	Alejandro Casco
3	DF	SLV	Bayron Escobar
4	DF	SLV	Leao Arteaga
5	DF	SLV	Steven Mira
6		SLV	Fernando Caceres
7	MF	SLV	Omar Crespín
8	MF	SLV	Walter Menjívar
9		SLV	Juan Pérez
10		SLV	Diego Flores
11		SLV	Harvi Portillo
12	MF	SLV	Ronald Orellana
14	FW	SLV	Bladimir Figueroa
17	DF	SLV	César Chevez (captain)
19	MF	SLV	Javier Rivas
20	DF	SLV	Marcos Portillo
21	MF	SLV	Levin Rojas
22		SLV	Robert Herrera
23	FW	SLV	Juan Gil
24	GK	SLV	Marcos Martínez
25		SLV	Maverick Hernández
28		SLV	Dennis Fuentes

No.	Pos.	Nation	Player
—	MF	SLV	Diego Guevara
—	DF	SLV	Anibal Hernández

=== Players with dual citizenship ===
- (El Salvador) (United States) Abraham Espinoza

=== In ===
Note: Flags indicate national team as defined under FIFA eligibility rules; some limited exceptions apply. Players may hold more than one non-FIFA nationality.

No.	Pos.	Nation	Player
—		SLV	Diego Flores (From TBD)
—		SLV	Robert Herrera (From Inter FA)
—	DF	SLV	Alexander Escobar (From Isidro Metapan Reserva)
—		SLV	TBD (From TBD)

No.	Pos.	Nation	Player
—		SLV	TBD (From TBD)
—		SLV	TBD (From TBD)
—		SLV	TBD (From TBD)

=== Out ===
Note: Flags indicate national team as defined under FIFA eligibility rules; some limited exceptions apply. Players may hold more than one non-FIFA nationality.

No.	Pos.	Nation	Player
—		SLV	Steven Mira (To LA Firpo)
—		SLV	Diego Guevara (To LA Firpo)
—		SLV	TBD (To TBD)
—		SLV	TBD (To TBD)

No.	Pos.	Nation	Player
—		SLV	TBD (To TBD)
—		SLV	TBD (To TBD)
—		SLV	TBD (To TBD)
—		SLV	TBD (To TBD)

== Coaching staff ==
As of September 2025

Position	Staff
Manager	(El Salvador) Ricardo Serrano
Assistant Manager	(El Salvador) Manfredy Galdamex
Physical coach	(El Salvador) Douglas Pocasangre
Goalkeeper Coach	(El Salvador) Edgar Beltran
Kineslogist	(El Salvador) Alejandro Vasquez
Utility Equipment	(El Salvador) Omar Navarro
Utility Equipment	(El Salvador) TBD
Football director	(El Salvador) TBD
Team Doctor	(El Salvador) TBD

== List of coaches ==
- (El Salvador) Ricardo Serrano (2014)
- (El Salvador) Ángel Pérez (January 2021-)
- (El Salvador) Alfredo Portillo (January 2022)
- (El Salvador) Ulises Monge (June 2023 - January 2024)
- (El Salvador) Efraín Burgos (January 2024 - August 2025)
- (El Salvador) Ricardo Serrano (August 2025 - December 2025)
- (El Salvador) Balmore Gomez (January 2026)
- (El Salvador) Adonay Salinas (January 2026 - Present)
