= Nacional F.C. (Sonsonate) =

Association football club in El Salvador

Nacional FC
- Full name: Nacional Fútbol Club
- Founded: 2026
- Ground: Estadio Anna Mercedes Campos
- Capacity: 10,000
- Chairman: (Colombia) Julian Acevedo
- Manager: (El Salvador) TBD
- League: Liga de Ascenso
- 2026 Clausura: Overall: 12th (Relegated); Playoffs: Did not qualify
Home colours	Away colours

Nacional Fútbol Club is a Salvadoran professional football club based in Sonsonate, La Paz department, El Salvador.

The club was formed after relocation of the previous club Zacatecoluca to Sonsonate.

The club will play in the Liga de Ascenso.

The club's stadium is Estadio Anna Mercedes Campos in Sonsonate.

== Current squad ==
Note: Flags indicate national team as defined under FIFA eligibility rules; some limited exceptions apply. Players may hold more than one non-FIFA nationality.

No.	Pos.	Nation	Player
1	GK	ESA	Elmer Posada
2	DF	ESA	Diego Lemus
3	DF	ESA	Brandon Retana
4	DF	ESA	Nestor Somoza
5	DF	ESA	Sergio Castillo
6	DF	ESA	Harrison Valladares
7	FW	ESA	Inner Guevara
8	MF	ESA	Steven Paniagua
9	FW	ESA	Bryan Alas
10	FW	ESA	Andres Vizcaino
11	FW	ESA	Javier Bolanos
12	GK	ESA	Joel Osorio
13	DF	ESA	Osmaro Orellana
14	MF	ESA	Levi Zelaya
15	MF	ESA	Angel Ortega
16	MF	ESA	Luis Miguel Portillo

No.	Pos.	Nation	Player
17	FW	ESA	Ymer Menjivar
19	MF	ESA	Henry Tamacas
20	MF	ESA	Allan Castro
21	FW	ESA	Walter Gutierrez
22	FW	ESA	Samuel Merino
23	FW	ESA	Zander Tidwell
24	FW	ESA	Alessandro Nativi
25		ESA	Maximus de Frias
26	FW	ESA	Miguel Campos
27	FW	ESA	Jose Aguilar
28	DF	ESA	Rafael Montes
29	DF	ESA	Cesar Fuentes
30	GK	ESA	Angel Reyes

=== Players with dual citizenship ===
- (El Salvador) (Brazil) Maximus de Frias
- (El Salvador) (United States) Zander Tidwell

=== Out on loan ===
Note: Flags indicate national team as defined under FIFA eligibility rules; some limited exceptions apply. Players may hold more than one non-FIFA nationality.

No. / Pos. / Nation / Player; — / MF / ESA / Carlos Pena (at Aguila for the 2026–2027 season)	No. / Pos. / Nation / Player; — / MF / COL / Víctor Landazuri (at Atletico Balboa for the 2026–2027 season)

== List of coaches ==
- (El Salvador) Lazaro Gutierrez (April 2026 – Present)

== Non-playing staff ==
=== List of President ===
- (Colombia) Julián Acevedo (June 2026 - Present)

== Notable Players ==
=== Team captains ===
Name	Years
(El Salvador) Diego Lemus	June 2026-Present
