= Independiente San Vicente =

Independiente San Vicente F.C.
- Full name: Independiente San Vicente
- Nickname: TBD
- Founded: 2 June 2026; 2 months ago
- Ground: Estadio Jiboa, Ciudad de San Vicente, El Salvador
- Capacity: 8,000
- Chairman: (El Salvador)
- Manager: (El Salvador) Guillermo Rivera
- League: (El Salvador) Liga de Ascenso
- 2026: 9º
Home colours	Away colours

Independiente San Vicente is a Salvadoran professional football club based in San Vicente, El Salvador. The club was formed after relocation of the previous club Cruzeiro to San Vicente.

The club currently plays in the Liga de Ascenso.

== Honours ==
=== Domestic honours ===
- Segunda División Salvadorean and predecessors
  - Champions: TBD

== Sponsorship ==
Companies that Independiente San Vicente currently has sponsorship deals with for 2026–2027 includes:

- (Ecuador) Boman Sport – Official kit suppliers
- (El Salvador) TBD – Official sponsors
- (Mexico) TBD – Official sponsors

== Players ==
=== Current squad ===
As of: July, 2026 Note: Flags indicate national team as defined under FIFA eligibility rules; some limited exceptions apply. Players may hold more than one non-FIFA nationality.

No.	Pos.	Nation	Player
—	DF	SLV	Daniel Larin
—		SLV	TBD (captain)
—	MF	SLV	Oscar Mejia
—	MF	SLV	Kevin Lopez
—	MF	SLV	Oscar Daniel Casillo
—	MF	SLV	Steve Alfaro
—	DF	SLV	Jorge Valle
—	DF	SLV	Orssi Rodriguez
—	MF	SLV	Daniel Aguirre
—	MF	SLV	Diego Flores
—	MF	SLV	Samuel Reyes

No.	Pos.	Nation	Player
—	DF	SLV	William Cerna
—	DF	SLV	Xavier Hernandez
—	DF	SLV	Alejandro Cruz
—	DF	SLV	Diego Vallardez
—	MF	SLV	Daniel Flores
—	MF	COL	Rafael Lopez
—	GK	SLV	Jaime Mozo
—	GK	SLV	Diego Urquilla

=== Out on loan ===
Note: Flags indicate national team as defined under FIFA eligibility rules; some limited exceptions apply. Players may hold more than one non-FIFA nationality.

No.	Pos.	Nation	Player
—		SLV	TBD (to TBDy until May 2020)
—		SLV	TBD (to TBDy until May 2020)

=== In ===
Note: Flags indicate national team as defined under FIFA eligibility rules; some limited exceptions apply. Players may hold more than one non-FIFA nationality.

No.	Pos.	Nation	Player
—	DF	SLV	TBD (From TBD)
—	DF	SLV	TBD (From TBD)
—	DF	SLV	TBD (From TBD)

No.	Pos.	Nation	Player
—	DF	SLV	TBD (From TBD)
—	DF	SLV	TBD (From TBD)
—	DF	SLV	TBD (From TBD)

=== Out ===
Note: Flags indicate national team as defined under FIFA eligibility rules; some limited exceptions apply. Players may hold more than one non-FIFA nationality.

No.	Pos.	Nation	Player
—	MF	SLV	TBD (To TBD)
—	MF	SLV	TBD (To TBD)
—	MF	SLV	TBD (To TBD)
—	MF	SLV	TBD (To TBD)

No.	Pos.	Nation	Player
—	MF	SLV	TBD (To TBD)
—	MF	SLV	TBD (To TBD)
—	MF	SLV	TBD (To TBD)
—	MF	SLV	TBD (To TBD)

== Management and support staff ==
=== Coaching staff ===
As of July 2026

Position	Staff
Manager	(Colombia) Jaime Giraldo
Assistant Manager	(El Salvador) TBD
Fitness Coach	(El Salvador) Andres Rios
Goalkeeper Coach	(El Salvador) Obed Baldemar
Under 17 Manager	(El Salvador) TBD
Under 15 Manager	(El Salvador) TBD
Team Doctor	(El Salvador) TBD
Kinesiologist	(El Salvador) TBD
Utility	(El Salvador) TBD

== Records and statistics ==
=== Club records ===
- First victory in the Primera Division for Independiente: 3-2 TBD, 1977
- First goalscorer in the Primera Division for Independiente: TBD v TBD, 1977
- Largest Home victory, Primera División: 4-1 v Chalatenango 2 February 2020
- Largest Away victory, Primera División: 3-0 v Pasaquina, 29 October 2018
- Largest Home loss, Primera División: 1–3 v Chalatenango, 4 November 2018
- Largest Away loss, Primera División: 0-8 v Aguila, October 28, 2007
- Highest home attendance: 2,000 v Primera División, 2018
- Highest away attendance: 1,000 v Primera División, San Salvador, 2018
- Most goals scored, season, Primera División: 55 goals, 1982 Season
- Worst season: Primera Division 1984 & Apertura 2006: 4 wins, 7 draws and 16 losses (15 points) and 4 wins, 3 draws and 11 losses (15 points)

=== Individual records ===
- Record appearances (all competitions): TBD, 822 from 1957 to 1975
- Record appearances (Primera Division): Paraguayan Jorge Caceres, 64 from 2018 to 2019
- Most capped player for El Salvador: 62 (0 whilst at Independiente), Magico Gonzalez
- Most international caps for El Salvador while a Independiente player: 1, TBD
- Most caps won whilst at Independiente: 1, TBD.
- Record scorer in league: TBD, 16
- Most goals in a season (all competitions): TBD, 62 (1927/28) (47 in League, 15 in Cup competitions)
- Most goals in a season (Primera Division): Óscar Gustavo “Lotario” Guerrero, 19 (1982)

=== Team captains ===
Name	Years
(El Salvador) TBD	2026-Present

== Coaches ==
- (El Salvador) Guillermo Rivera (July 2026) - no official games
- (Colombia) Jaime Giraldo (August 2026 - Present)
