= Efraín Burgos =

Salvadoran footballer and manager (born 1961)

Personal information
- Full name: Efraín Antonio Burgos
- Date of birth: April 11, 1961 (age 65)
- Place of birth: Santa Ana, El Salvador
- Position: Midfielder

Team information
- Current team: Isidro Metapán (Head Coach)

Senior career*
Years	Team	Apps	(Gls)
1979	Once Lobos		
1980–1982	FAS		
1982–1986	Atlético Marte		
1986–1988	Isidro Metapán		
1988	Cobán Imperial		
1989–1990	Atlético Marte		
1990–1991	Isidro Metapán		
1992–1994	Cobán Imperial		
1994	FAS		
1994–1995	Alianza		

International career
1988	El Salvador	5	(0)

Managerial career
- 2013: Santa Cruz County Breakers
- 2013–2014: FAS
- 2015: San Pablo Tacachico
- 2015: UES
- 2016: Atlético Marte
- 2016: Audaz
- 2016–2017: UES
- 2017: Dragón (sports director)
- 2019: Once Lobos
- 2024–2025: Talleres Jr
- 2025-Present: Isidro Metapán
- * Club domestic league appearances and goals

Efraín Antonio Burgos (born April 11, 1961) is a Salvadoran former professional footballer and current manager of Isidro Metapán.

Since 2009 he works for the USSF in San Francisco as a coach. His son Efrain, Jr. is a professional footballer.

== Club career ==
Chirolón Burgos started his professional career at Once Lobos and had spells at FAS with whom he won the 1981 league title, Atlético Marte, Isidro Metapán and Guatemalan club Cobán Imperial, before retiring with another league title win at Alianza in 1995.

== Coaching career ==
=== FAS ===
In December 2013, Burgos signed as new coach of FAS, replacing Jaime de la Pava. With the team of Santa Ana, Burgos reached the semi-finals of the Clausura 2014, but was eliminated by Dragón. Days later Burgos left the team due to family reasons, being replaced by Agustín Castillo.

=== San Pablo Tacachico ===
In June 2015, Burgos signed as new coach of San Pablo Tacachico.

=== UES ===
Burgos signed with UES as coach for the rest of the Apertura 2015 tournament, replacing William Renderos Iraheta.

His debut was a 1–2 defeat against Chalatenango in the Estadio José Gregorio Martínez. His balance was five defeats, six ties and one victory. Burgos coached the scarlet team in the midst of a serious administrative, economic and sports crisis, suffering arrears in salary payments. Burgos was fired from UES after the end of the tournament, being replaced by Edgar Henríquez.

=== Atlético Marte ===
Burgos signed as coach with Atlético Marte for the rest of the Clausura 2016 tournament, replacing Juan Andrés Sarulyte. With Atlético Marte Burgos experienced a serious administrative, economic and sports crisis, arrears in salary payments and pressures from club directive.

At the end of the tournament Atlético Marte descended after a 1–4 defeat against Pasaquina, being in the 12th position in the league table with only 14 points, and 10 points from Sonsonate in the Aggregate Table.

=== Audaz ===
In June 2016 Burgos signed as new coach of Audaz. However, after only coached two games Burgos left the team.

=== Return to UES ===
Burgos signed again with UES for the rest of the Apertura 2016 and Clausura 2017, replacing Edgar Henríquez. His debut on his return was a 2–3 defeat against Sonsonate. His second stage with UES ended with the team's descent after a 1–0 victory against Pasaquina in the Estadio Universitario at the last game of the Clausura 2017. Again Burgos suffered in the scarlet team an administrative crisis and arrears in salary payments.

=== Dragón ===
Burgos signed with Dragón for the rest of the Apertura 2017 tournament, replacing Henry Vanegas. Dragón at that time was mired in an economic, institutional and sports crisis. Days later it was known that Burgos did not have a valid title to coach in Salvadoran Primera División and therefore could not be registered by Dragón.

Months later Burgos was fired from Dragón after a 2–2 draw against Sonsonate. Burgos was fired without having been registered as the team's main coach. The directive of Dragón, to avoid sanctions, relegated him to the position of Sports Director.

Burgos was replaced by Santos Rivera and Abel Blanco for the rest of the games.

== International career ==
Burgos also played for El Salvador and has represented them 5 times in the 1980s.

== Honours ==
=== Club honours ===
==== As a player ====
- FAS
  - Primera División de Fútbol de El Salvador (1): 1994–95, 1995–96
- Águila
  - La Primera (2): 2000 Apertura, Clausura 2001

==== As a coach ====
- Talleres Jr
  - Tercera Division (2): Apertura 2024, Clausura 2025
