= C.D. Aruba =

- Full name: Club Deportivo Aruba
- Ground: Cancha Hacienda El Transito, El Salvador
- League: Segunda Division
| Home colours | Away colours |

Club Deportivo Aruba is a Salvadoran football club based in Curazao, Jayaque, La Libertad, El Salvador.

The club currently plays in the Tercera Division de Fútbol Salvadoreño after purchasing a spot.

The club will play in the Segunda Division after purchasing Los Laureles spot.

== History ==
=== Merger years (2025-Present) ===
In 2025, the club purchased the spot of Los Laureles in Segunda Division, this was followed by the club merging with ADET to form ADET-Aruba.

== Honours ==
=== Domestic honours ===
==== Leagues ====
- Tercera División Salvadorean and predecessors
  - Champions (2) : N/A
  - Play-off winner (2):
- La Asociación Departamental de Fútbol Aficionado' and predecessors (4th tier)
  - Champions (1): Sonsonate Department 2023–2024
  - Play-off winner (2):

== Current squad ==
Note: Flags indicate national team as defined under FIFA eligibility rules; some limited exceptions apply. Players may hold more than one non-FIFA nationality.

| No. | Pos. | Nation | Player |
|---|---|---|---|
| 1 | GK | SLV | Nicolas Pacheco (captain) |
| 4 | | SLV | Jaime Somoza |
| 5 | | SLV | Armando G |
| 6 | | SLV | Ernesto Crespin |
| 7 | | SLV | Alexis R |
| 8 | | SLV | Diego Velasquez |
| 9 | | COL | Jhoni Moran |
| 11 | | SLV | Carlos Herrera |
| 12 | | SLV | Jonathon Hernandez |
| 14 | | SLV | Enrique Contreras |
| 15 | | SLV | Daniel Gomez |
| 26 | | SLV | Harol O |
| 28 | | SLV | Bryan Ortega |
| — | | SLV | Ovidio Hernandez |
| — | | SLV | Andres Prado |
| — | | SLV | Diego Urrutia |

| No. | Pos. | Nation | Player |
|---|---|---|---|
| — | GK | SLV | Luis Carranza |
| — | | SLV | Flavio Mayora |
| — | | SLV | Marco Rodriguez |
| — | | SLV | Maycol Brizuela |
| — | | SLV | Paolo Ramirez |
| — | | SLV | TBD |

=== In ===
Note: Flags indicate national team as defined under FIFA eligibility rules; some limited exceptions apply. Players may hold more than one non-FIFA nationality.

| No. | Pos. | Nation | Player |
|---|---|---|---|
| 1 | GK | SLV | Nicolas Pacheco (From Zacatecoluca) |
| — | | SLV | Carlos Herrera (From TBD) |
| — | | SLV | Flavio Mayora (From Belmopan Bandits FSC) |
| — | | SLV | Marco Rodriguez (From Tiburones de Sonsonate) |
| — | | SLV | Jaime Somoza (From Cruzeiro) |
| — | | SLV | Diego Urrutia (From TBD) |
| — | | COL | Jhoni Moran (From TBD) |
| — | | SLV | Jonathan Hernandez (From Cacahuatique) |

| No. | Pos. | Nation | Player |
|---|---|---|---|
| — | | SLV | Enrique Contreras (From Platense) |
| — | | SLV | Maycol Brizuela (From CD Curazao) |
| — | | SLV | Paolo Ramirez (From TBD) |
| — | | SLV | Ernesto Crespin (From TBD) |
| — | | SLV | (From TBD) |

=== Out ===
Note: Flags indicate national team as defined under FIFA eligibility rules; some limited exceptions apply. Players may hold more than one non-FIFA nationality.

| No. | Pos. | Nation | Player |
|---|---|---|---|
| — | | SLV | TBD (To TBD) |
| — | | SLV | TBD (To TBD) |
| — | | SLV | TBD (To TBD) |
| — | | SLV | TBD (To TBD) |

| No. | Pos. | Nation | Player |
|---|---|---|---|
| — | | SLV | TBD (To TBD) |
| — | | SLV | TBD (To TBD) |
| — | | SLV | TBD (To TBD) |

== Coaching staff ==
As of July 2025

| Position | Staff |
|---|---|
| Manager | (El Salvador) Miguel Soriano |
| Assistant Manager | (El Salvador) |
| Physical coach | (El Salvador) Gerardo Quintanilla |
| Goalkeeper Coach | (El Salvador) Will Cardonna |
| Kineslogic | (El Salvador) TBD |
| Utility Equipment | (El Salvador) Gervachyny Martir |
| Football director | (El Salvador) TBD |
| Team Doctor | (El Salvador) TBD |

== List of coaches ==
- (El Salvador) Alexis Urbina ( TBD - February 2025)
- (El Salvador) Miguel Soriano (February 2025 - August 2025)
- (Uruguay) Rubén da Silva (August 2025 - Present)

== Records ==
- Record League victory: vs TBD, 2024
- Largest Home victory, Primera División: 5-1 v TBD, Day Month Year
- Largest Away victory, Primera División: 3-0 v TBD, Day Month Year
- Largest Home loss, Primera División: 1–3 v TBD, Day Month Year
- Largest Away loss, Primera División: 1-4 v TBD, Day Month Year
- Highest average attendance, season: 49,176, Primera División
- Most goals scored, season, Primera División: 25, TBD
- Worst season: Segunda Division 2002-2003: 1 win, 4 draws and 17 losses (7 points)
- Record Cup Victory5-1 v TBD, Day Month Year
- Record Cup Defeat: 1–3 v TBD, Day Month Year
- Most successive victories TBD matches (from 26 December 1999 to 7 March 2000)
- Most games without a win TBD matches (from 18 October 2008 to 13 January 2009)
- Most successive defeats TBD matches (from 11 April 1990 to 15 September 1990)
- Most successive draws TBD matches (from 13 December 1992 to 16 January 1993)
- Longest unbeaten TBD matches (from 4 October 1980 to 20 December 1980)
- Record home attendance 3,000 vs TBD, League Seasom, Day Month Year
- Record lowest home attendance 340 vs TBD, Day Month Year
- Record league attendance 68,160 vs TBD, Day Month Year

=== Individual records ===
- Record appearances (all competitions):
- Record appearances (Primera Division):
- Most goals in a season (all competitions): TBD (168)
- Most hat-tricks (all competitions):
- Most international caps player for Aruba-ADET: 00 (0 whilst at Sal Y Mar), TBD
- Most international caps for El Salvador while a Sal Y Mar player:
- Most goals scored by one player: 7, TBD vs TBD, 2024
- Oldest player: TBD (36 years and 239 days)
- Youngest player: TBD (15 years and 00 days) [1]
- Oldest scorer: Nicolas Munoz (36 years and 239 days)
- Youngest scorer: TBD (16 years and 310 days)
- Quickest scorer: TBD (9 seconds)
- Quickest sending off: TBD (3 minutes)
