= AD SESA =

Association football club in El Salvador

- Full name: Asociacion Deportiva SESA
- Ground: Cancha vista Al Volcan, El Salvador
- League: Liga de Ascenso
Home colours

Asociacion Deportiva SESA is a Salvadoran football club based in Guadalupe, San Vicente Department, El Salvador.

The club currently plays in the Liga de Ascenso.

== Honours ==
=== Domestic honours ===
==== Leagues ====
- Tercera División Salvadorean and predecessors
  - Champions (2) : N/A
  - Play-off winner (2):
- La Asociación Departamental de Fútbol Aficionado and predecessors (4th tier)
  - Champions (1): San Vicente Department 2023–2024
  - Play-off winner (2):

== Current squad ==
As of: August 3, 2025 Note: Flags indicate national team as defined under FIFA eligibility rules; some limited exceptions apply. Players may hold more than one non-FIFA nationality.

No.	Pos.	Nation	Player
3		SLV	Jose Sibrian
7		SLV	Santos Lopez
9		SLV	Anderson Aguilera
10		ECU	David Quinonez
12		SLV	Diego Climaco
14		SLV	Daniel Molina
16	MF	SLV	Brandon Canizales
17	DF	SLV	Jhony ALvarenga
23	GK	SLV	Joel Lopez
30	FW	SLV	Santos Guzman

No.	Pos.	Nation	Player
—		SLV	Juan Alvarado
—		SLV	Fares Dominguez
—		SLV	Kevin Villalobos
—		SLV	Geovany Coreas
—		SLV	Fredy Lozano
—		SLV	Francisco Menjivar
—		SLV	TBD
—		SLV	TBD
—		SLV	TBD

=== In ===
Note: Flags indicate national team as defined under FIFA eligibility rules; some limited exceptions apply. Players may hold more than one non-FIFA nationality.

No.	Pos.	Nation	Player
—		ECU	David Quinonez (From TBD)
—	GK	SLV	Joel Lopez (From TBD)
—		SLV	Willian Vasquez (From TBD)
—		SLV	Mathio Mendez (From TBD)
—	FW	SLV	Santos Guzman (From TBD)
—	MF	SLV	Brandon Canizales (From TBD)

No.	Pos.	Nation	Player
—		SLV	Santos Lopez (From TBD)
—		SLV	Ramiro Recinos (From TBD)
—	MF	SLV	German Ramos (From TBD)
—	DF	SLV	Jhony ALvarenga (From TBD)

=== Out ===
Note: Flags indicate national team as defined under FIFA eligibility rules; some limited exceptions apply. Players may hold more than one non-FIFA nationality.

No.	Pos.	Nation	Player
—		SLV	TBD (From TBD)
—		SLV	TBD (From TBD)
—		SLV	TBD (From TBD)
—		SLV	TBD (From TBD)

No.	Pos.	Nation	Player
—		SLV	TBD (From TBD)
—		SLV	TBD (From TBD)
—		SLV	TBD (From TBD)

== List of coaches ==
- (El Salvador) TBD
- (Argentina) Julio Zamora (July 2025 - July 2026)
- (El Salvador) Juan Alvarado (August 2026 - Present)
