= C.D. Neo Pipil =

Association football club in El Salvador

- Full name: Club Deportivo Neo Pipil
- Founded: 1930
- Ground: Estadio Neo Pipil; San Juan Nonualco, La Paz, El Salvador
- Manager: (El Salvador) Manuel Lopez
- League: Liga de Ascenso
- Clausura 2012: Grupo Centro Oriente A, 4th
Home colours	Away colours

Club Deportivo Neo Pipil is a Salvadoran professional football club based in San Juan Nonualco, La Paz, El Salvador.

The club currently plays in the Liga de Ascenso.

== History ==
The club won Tercera Division de Fútbol Salvadoreño (2025 Clausura) title after defeating Pipil 4-3 on aggregate, after extra-time. The club would go on to win promotion playoff against Atletico San Simon 2-0, which allowed the club to be promoted to the Segundo Division.

== Honours ==
=== Domestic honours ===
==== Leagues ====
- Tercera División Salvadorean and predecessors
  - Champions (1) : 2025 Clausura
  - Play-off winner (2): 2024-2025
- La Asociación Departamental de Fútbol Aficionado' and predecessors (4th tier)
  - Champions (1):
  - Play-off winner (2):

== Current squad ==
Note: Flags indicate national team as defined under FIFA eligibility rules; some limited exceptions apply. Players may hold more than one non-FIFA nationality.

No.	Pos.	Nation	Player
1	GK	PAR	Sandro Melgarejo (captain)
2		SLV	Brandon Melendez
4		SLV	Jefferson Angel
5		SLV	Bany Mendoza
6		SLV	Kenner Arevalo
7		SLV	William Rivera
8		SLV	Noe Ventura
10		SLV	Edgar Valladares
11		SLV	Vicente Diaz
14		SLV	Iker Bolanos
15		SLV	Cesar Gochez
16		SLV	Anderson Villegas
17		SLV	Alfredo Ceron
19		SLV	Anderson Castro
21		SLV	Cesar Flores
23		SLV	Angel Castillo
24		SLV	Luis Rivas
30	GK	SLV	Jimmy Alvarez

No.	Pos.	Nation	Player
—		SLV	Joel Aviles
—		SLV	Luis Morales
—		SLV	Henry Rodriguez
—		SLV	Jonathan Tejada
—		SLV	Lucas Palacios

=== Players with dual citizenship ===
- (El Salvador) (United States) TBD

=== In ===
Note: Flags indicate national team as defined under FIFA eligibility rules; some limited exceptions apply. Players may hold more than one non-FIFA nationality.

No.	Pos.	Nation	Player
—		SLV	Vidal Juarez (From TBD)
—		SLV	Jefferson Angel (From TBD)
—		SLV	Brandon Molina (From TBD)
—		SLV	Xavier Mendoza (From TBD)
—		PAR	Sandro Melgarejo (From TBD)

No.	Pos.	Nation	Player
—		SLV	Alfredo Villalta (From TBD)
—		SLV	Edgar Valladares (From Cruzeiro)
—		SLV	TBD (From TBD)

=== Out ===
Note: Flags indicate national team as defined under FIFA eligibility rules; some limited exceptions apply. Players may hold more than one non-FIFA nationality.

No.	Pos.	Nation	Player
—		SLV	Fernando Gómez (To TBD)
—		SLV	Gael Gómez (To TBD)
—		SLV	José Cerna (To TBD)
—		SLV	Josué Paredes (To TBD)
—		SLV	José Monterrosa (To TBD)

No.	Pos.	Nation	Player
—		SLV	Elmer Molina (To TBD)
—		SLV	Francisco Monterrosa (To TBD)
—		SLV	Carlos Escobar (To TBD)
—		SLV	Ronaldo Molina (To TBD)

== Notable Player ==
- (El Salvador) Rene Andres Ubau (1987)

== List of coaches ==
- (El Salvador) Carlos Mauricio Sotelo (May 2021 – May 2022)
- (El Salvador) Ricardo Mancía (June 2022 - August 2022)
- (El Salvador) Alonso Aguilar (August 2022 - January 2023)
- (El Salvador) Giovanni Trigueros (January 2023 - June 2024)
- (El Salvador) Manuel López (June 2024 - July 2026)
- (El Salvador) David Hernandez (August 2026 - Present)
