= Nuestra Belleza El Salvador Universo 2008 =

- Date: May 3, 2008
- Venue: Auditorio ILC Fepade, San Salvador, El Salvador
- Entrants: 15
- Returns: El Salvador USA
- Winner: Rebeca Moreno; San Salvador

The Nuestra Belleza El Salvador Universo 2008 was held on May 3, 2008, in the Auditorio ILC Fepade, San Salvador, El Salvador. There were 15 contestant representing departments and the Salvadoran community. The winner will enter Miss Universe 2008 and Miss Continente Americano 2008.

== Results ==
Final results	Contestant
Nuestra Belleza El Salvador Universo 2008	San Salvador - Rebeca Moreno
1st Runner-up	El Salvador USA - Lisbeth Abarca
2nd Runner-up	La Unión - Maryethe Martínez
Semi-finalists	Chalatenango - Yasmin Alberto; San Vicente - Cecilia Silva; Morazán - Mery Melendéz

=== Special awards ===
- Miss Photogenic - Rebeca Moreno (San Salvador)
- Best National Costume - Larissa Aguirre (Cabañas)
- Miss Congeniality (voted by contestants) - Maryethe Martínez (La Unión)
- Best Hair - Carmen Salazar (Santa Ana)
- Best Legs - Rebeca Moreno (San Salvador)
- Best Face - Rebeca Moreno (San Salvador)
- Miss Fashion - Cecilia Silva (San Vicente)

== Candidates ==
Represented	Contestant	Age	Height (cm)	Height (ft)	Hometown
Chalatenango	Yasmin Alberto	24	1.60	5'3"	Chalatenango
Cabañas	Larissa Aguirre	19	1.73	5'8"	Ilobasco
Ahuachapán	Dixie Vaquero	20	1.60	5'3"	Jujutla
Cuscatlán	Maryelli Velásquez	19	1.61	5'3"	Suchitoto
El Salvador USA	Lisbeth Abarca	23	1.74	5'8"	Miami
La Libertad	Karla Grande	24	1.66	5'5"	Colón
La Paz	Mariello Reneé Valdivieso	18	1.68	5'6"	Olocuilta
La Unión	Maryethe Martínez	23	1.73	5'8"	La Unión
Morazán	Mery Melendéz	21	1.74	5'8"	Corinto
San Miguel	Cindy Saravia	21	1.66	5'5"	San Miguel
San Salvador	Rebeca Moreno	22	1.60	5'3"	San Salvador
San Vicente	Cecilia Silva	19	1.76	5'9"	Apastepeque
Santa Ana	Carmen Salazar	20	1.80	5'11"	Santa Ana
Sonsonate	Jackeline Paredes	18	1.73	5'8"	Izalco
Usulután	Dayana Chafoya	20	1.68	5'6"	Batres
