= San Isidro, Cabañas =

District in Cabañas Department, El Salvador

San Isidro
- District

- Location in El Salvador
- Coordinates: 13°50′N 88°43′W
- Country: El Salvador
- Department: Cabañas
- Municipality: Cabañas Este

Government
  - Mayor: Edgardo Portillo

Area
  - District: 30.24 sq mi (78.33 km^{2})
- Elevation: 1,191 ft (363 m)

Population (2024)
  - District: 7,333
  - Rank: 160th in El Salvador
  - Rural: 7,333

San Isidro is a district in the Cabañas Department of El Salvador, roughly 70 kilometres (43 mi) northeast of San Salvador.

== History ==
The parish of San Isidro was established in an electoral law dated February 18, 1873. It belonged to the San Vicente Department from the 12 June 1824 to 10 February 1873, after which it became part of the newly formed Cabañas Department. By legislative decree of February 7, 1879 it was awarded municipal status.

In 1977, archaeologist Wolfgang Haberland was involved in an excavation in the municipality. He discovered petroglyphs in the Grutas de Corinto dated to the Preclassic Mesoamerican period ( 1200 to 400 BC). In the late 1990s, the FAO funded the "Sustainable agriculture on hillsides" project in the municipality of San Isidro.

== Geography ==
The district covers an area of 78.33 square kilometres (30.24 sq mi), and is bordered to the north and east by Sensuntepeque, to the east by Guacotecti, to the south by Santa Clara, San Esteban Catarina and San Sebastián in the San Vicente Department, and to the west by Ilobasco. It is surrounded by the Morontepeque, Humeras and El Orégano hills, and the principal rivers are the Las Cañas, De los Pueblos, Titihuapa, San Isidro, El Jícaro and Viejo.

=== Administrative divisions ===
The district is divided into 7 communities, with 22 caseríos (hamlets):

- Izcatal; 687 inhabitants; 2 caseríos (Izcatal, las Vainillas)
- El Ámate; 1,402 inhabitants; 5 caseríos (El Ámate, El Zarzal, El Junquillo, La Loma)
- Los Jobos; 1,085 inhabitants; 4 caseríos (Los Jobos, Cerro de Ávila, Los Jobitos, El Jute)
- Llano de La Hacienda; 1,424 inhabitants; 1 caserío (Llano de la Hacienda)
- Potrero de Batres; 837 inhabitants; 2 caseríos (Potrero de Batres, El Tablón)
- Potrero y Tabla; 557 inhabitants; 2 caseríos (Potrero y Tabla, Horcones)
- San Francisco; 1,397 inhabitants; 5 caseríos (San Francisco, Hacienda Vieja, Las Minas)

== Economy ==
The principal agricultural items produced include basic grains, sesame and sugarcane. The people raise livestock: cattle, pigs, horses and mules. Dairy products and sweet brown sugar are produced. San Isidro is also a manufacturer of building materials. The Asociacion de Amigos de San Isidro Cabanas (ASIC, Friends of San Isidro Cabanas Association) is a community organization which deals with local mining.

== Landmarks ==
The local government building is located on Avenida Mayo 15, west of the 1,500 m^{2} Parco central. It was built in 1956, made of adobe with a tile roof and wooden frame, with a portal on the main façade in the colonial style. Over the years it has functioned as the mayor's office, a prison and health centre. Casa de la cultura is located on Calle Central, built with mud brick walls and columns of reinforced concrete, with glass lattice windows and brick cement flooring. Iglesia San Isidro Labrador was completed in 1988.

== Bibliography ==
- Stahler-Sholk, Richard; Vanden, Harry E.; Becker, Marc (25 November 2014). Rethinking Latin American Social Movements: Radical Action from Below. Rowman & Littlefield Publishers. ISBN 978-1-4422-3569-4.
