= Titihuapa River =

Coordinates: 13°44′59″N 88°31′52″W

The Titihuapa is a river of El Salvador. A tributary of the Zapotal, it flows for 15 kilometres (9.3 mi) through the municipalities of San Isidro, Cabañas, Sensuntepeque, San Sebastián, San Esteban Catarina and Santa Clara, spanning the Cabañas and San Vicente departments. In 2004 excavations along the bank discovered petroglyphs.
