= Dolores, El Salvador =

District in Cabañas Department, El Salvador

Dolores
- District
- Location of Dolores in Cabañas, Department

- Location in El Salvador
- Coordinates: 13°47′N 88°34′W
- Country: El Salvador
- Department: Cabañas
- Municipality: Cabañas Este

Government
  - Type: Mayoralty
  - Mayor: Edgardo Portillo
- Elevation: 325 ft (99 m)

Population (2024)
  - District: 6,267
  - Rank: 181st in El Salvador
  - Urban: 8
  - Rural: 6,259

Dolores is a district in the Cabañas Department of El Salvador. It borders Honduras to the north and east, the municipality of Sensuntepeque to the north and west, the department of San Miguel to the east, and the department of San Vicente to the south.
