= Odio =

Odio may refer to:

- Elizabeth Odio Benito (born 1939), Vice-President of the International Criminal Court
- Rodrigo Carazo Odio (1926–2009), President of Costa Rica
- Silvia Odio, Cuban-American who testified to the Warren Commission
- Odio, the primary antagonist of the video game Live A Live

== Music ==
- Odio, band in the Basque Radical Rock movement

=== Songs ===
- "Odio", Umberto Bindi 1959
- "Odio", prize winning song by Pablo Ríos 1970
- "Odio" (song), song by Romeo Santos 2014

== See also ==
- Odo (disambiguation)
