= Sylvia Meagher =

JFK assassination researcher and author (1921–1989)

- Born: Sylvia Orenstein; July 22, 1921; Brooklyn, New York City, U.S.
- Died: January 14, 1989 (aged 67); New York City
- Occupations: Author, WHO analyst
- Spouse: James P. Meagher (m. 1951, divorced)
- Writing career
- Notable work: Accessories After the Fact

Sylvia Meagher (July 22, 1921 – January 14, 1989) was a World Health Organization analyst who devoted the last decades of her life to researching and writing about the JFK assassination. She was one of the so-called "first-generation" Warren Commission critics who challenged the methods and findings of the government's official inquiry into the assassination. In 1966, her Subject Index to the 26 volumes of Warren Commission Hearings and Exhibits was a valuable tool for other assassination researchers. The following year, her book Accessories After the Fact became one of the seminal texts in the JFK assassination literature.

== Background ==
Sylvia Orenstein was born in Brooklyn in 1921. She was raised in what she later characterized as an Orthodox Jewish home. In 1947 she was hired by the World Health Organization (WHO). She had meanwhile been taking night classes at Brooklyn College, where a romantic relationship developed with her English instructor, James Meagher (pronounced "Marr"). They married in 1951, but the marriage was short-lived due to his worsening alcoholism.

As historian Kathryn Olmsted notes, several early critics of the Warren Commission, who "set out to prove that their government was covering up a conspiracy", had themselves been victimized by a U.S. government conspiracy theory, namely, the post-WWII "Red Scare". In Meagher's case, she was targeted in 1954 in a formal probe by the International Organizations Employees Loyalty Board, "apparently because she had questioned the legality of the loyalty program. A full FBI field investigation found no evidence of communist activities, so Meagher was able to keep her job at the World Health Organization."

On the afternoon of November 22, 1963, she was working in her WHO office in the United Nations when she heard the news from Dallas that President Kennedy had been assassinated. In February 1964, she attended a lecture by defense attorney Mark Lane in New York City's Town Hall. He appeared that night with Marguerite Oswald, and he enumerated what he believed were serious inconsistencies in the government's conclusion that her son, Lee Harvey Oswald, was the lone assassin.

Meagher became deeply interested in the case and wanted to learn more. As soon as the 888-page Warren Report was published in September 1964, she bought a copy and wrote a detailed critique of it. Two months later, when the Warren Commission's 26 volumes of Hearings and Exhibits were made public, she ordered a set. John Kelin writes:

Each day, she took one of the volumes to work with her. She would read it on the way there and on the way back, and during her lunch hour. She also carried with her a large clipboard, on which she made constant notes and annotations.

In early 1965, she attended a fifteen-week course on the Warren Report that was offered in the evening at The New School for Social Research. It was taught by attorney Joseph S. Lobenthal. He told his students he was dissatisfied with the conclusions in the Warren Report, and that it would be useful to closely compare those conclusions against the evidence collected in the 26 volumes, "but it was too big a job for him to undertake by himself." It was a job which Meagher had already begun.

== Subject Index to the Warren Report and Hearings & Exhibits ==
One of the major obstacles for early Warren Commission critics was the lack of a subject index for the 26 volumes, with their estimated 20,000 pages and ten million words. Harold Weisberg called it "organized chaos". Meagher wrote: "The sheer mass of unclassified, unexplored data is enough to discourage an attempt to take inventory. It would be tantamount to a search for information in the Encyclopedia Britannica if the contents were untitled, unalphabetized, and in random sequence." She set herself the task of creating a comprehensive subject index to the 26 volumes. In her resulting book, published by Scarecrow Press in March 1966, she stated:

It is hoped that this systematic, comprehensive key to all the source material on any specific subject will enable scholars to test the assertions and conclusions in the Warren Report against their independent judgment, on the basis of fidelity to the source data and impartiality of selection by the authors of the Report.

Peter Dale Scott said that Meagher's Subject Index "may someday be remembered as the only index to have altered the history of U.S. politics." In an "American Postscript" to his 1966 book, The Oswald Affair, French journalist Léo Sauvage wrote: "Finally, I wish to express my gratitude to Mrs. Sylvia Meagher, author of an indispensable Subject Index to the Warren Report and the only person in the world who really knows every item hidden in the 26 volumes of Hearings and Exhibits."

== Accessories After the Fact ==
In her next book, Accessories After the Fact (1967), Meagher attacked the credibility of the Warren Report (WR), and she did so almost exclusively by using the Commission's own words and documents, as she describes in the Foreword:

This book examines the correlation, or lack of correlation, between the Report on the one hand and the Hearings and Exhibits on the other. The first pronounces Oswald guilty; the second, instead of corroborating the verdict reached by the Warren Commission, creates a reasonable doubt of Oswald's guilt and even a powerful presumption of his complete innocence of all the crimes of which he was accused.

She identifies numerous places where witness testimony in the 26 volumes contradicts the WR's conclusions. She observes how in many instances, witnesses with a contrary recollection were dismissed as "probably mistaken" or "lying". She cites other cases where the WR incorrectly summarized witness testimony, and always in a way unfavorable to Oswald. For example, Texas School Book Depository (TSBD) employee James Dougherty testified that he saw Oswald come into work on the morning of the assassination and that Oswald held nothing in his hands, even though the WR claims he was carrying a long paper-wrapped package concealing a rifle. Meagher then notes how the WR subtly weakened Dougherty's testimony by acknowledging that he saw Oswald enter the TSBD, "but he does not remember that Oswald had anything in his hands as he entered the door."

In her chapter on "The Autopsy and Medical Findings", she details how in the days and weeks after the assassination, the government's account of JFK's bullet wounds kept changing: "The autopsy report, with its presumably authoritative data, was not published; Dr. J. J. Humes, the chief autopsy surgeon, said that he had been forbidden to talk. As one version of the wounds succeeded another with dizzying speed and confusion, only one constant remained: Oswald was the lone assassin and had fired all the shots from the sixth floor of the Book Depository. When facts came into conflict with that thesis, the facts and not the thesis were changed."

In a section titled "The Proof of the Plot", she discusses the testimony of Silvia Odio, a 26-year-old Cuban émigré living in Dallas in 1963. Her father was a noted political prisoner in Cuba, and she was part of the anti-Castro movement. In late September 1963, three men came to her apartment, identified as "Leopoldo", "Angelo", and "Leon Oswald", and requested her help in soliciting funds for the Cuban exile group, Junta Revolucionaria (JURE). She declined their request. The next day, Odio received a phone call from Leopoldo, who told her that "Oswald" was an ex-Marine, a crack marksman, a bit "loco", and someone who felt that JFK should have been assassinated after the failed Bay of Pigs Invasion. On the day of the assassination, when Oswald's face appeared on TV, both Odio and her sister (who caught a glimpse of the three men that night) recognized him as "Leon Oswald".

The Commission members asserted that it could not have been Oswald at Odio's apartment since they were certain he was in Mexico in late September, but they asked the FBI to try to locate the three men. The Bureau came back with a preliminary finding that "Leon Oswald" was most likely an Arizona man named William Seymour who resembled Oswald. The WR then stated: "While the FBI had not yet completed its investigation into this matter at the time the report went to press, the Commission has concluded that Lee Harvey Oswald was not at Mrs. Odio's apartment in September 1963." Meagher argues that the unwillingness of the Commission to vigorously pursue Odio's story, with its troubling implications, was indicative of the approach taken during the entire investigation. She writes that Odio's credible testimony leaves two possibilities open:

that the real Oswald visited Mrs. Odio with two companions, one of whom deliberately planted highly incriminating information about him without his knowledge; or that a mock-Oswald visited her, to accomplish the same purpose.

Meagher sees "proof of the plot" in either possibility. She adds, "If there is a re-investigation of the assassination—as there must be if we are not to become the permanent accomplices in the degradation of justice which has taken place—the Odio affair should be high on the agenda."

The Sunday Times called Accessories After the Fact "the best documented and most damning of any attacks on the Warren Report yet." Richard Whalen in the Chicago Sun-Times said, "Every reader familiar with the controversy will be rewarded by her step-by-step pursuit of the truth; every newcomer will find what has been lacking in the critical literature—a sober, comprehensive summary."

== Later years ==
The praise garnered by Accessories After the Fact gave Meagher stature as a JFK assassination expert. She was invited on radio programs and panels. Her articles appeared in various publications, including Esquire, The Minority of One, Studies on the Left, and The Texas Observer. She was asked to write reviews of newly published JFK assassination books.

Within the community of first-generation and second-generation Warren Commission critics, she was a prolific letter-writer who formed many close working relationships, with one notable exception. She strongly disliked New Orleans District Attorney Jim Garrison, even to the point (it was later learned) of advising Clay Shaw on how to win acquittal from Garrison's prosecution in the 1969 trial. She wrote to Harold Weisberg that she disapproved of Garrison's "grandiosely hurled charges at the CIA and the Cuban exiles". She doubted he could ever substantiate his charges, and worried his failures would produce a "cry wolf" effect which could damage the whole JFK assassination research community, "and we will be scoffed at when we make similar claims, even if they are well founded." Her opposition to Garrison ended some of her friendships with fellow Warren Commission critics.

In 1980, she produced her final book, Master Index to the J.F.K. Assassination Investigation, which she developed in collaboration with Gary Owens. It was essentially an updated version of the 1966 Subject Index, but it now included her indexing of all published evidence from the recently completed House Select Committee on Assassinations.

Although Meagher believed the JFK assassination was perpetrated by a conspiracy, she never advocated for a particular conspiratorial theory, as she explained in a 1975 letter:

How does one choose between them, when all such hypotheses are compelling to a degree? After all these years, I still do not know if it was the CIA, the military, LBJ, the Cubans, or the Mafia, or any combination of them. But I always knew, know, and will always know for a certainty that C.E. 399 is a fake, that the autopsy is a fraud, that much of the other hard evidence is suspect or tainted, and that the Warren Report is false and deliberately false.

On January 14, 1989, Sylvia Meagher died at St. Vincent's Hospital in New York City of complications from influenza. She was 67.

== Bibliography ==
=== Books ===
- Subject Index to the Warren Report and Hearings & Exhibits. New York: Scarecrow Press. 1966. LCCN 66013736. OCLC 475118.
- Accessories After the Fact: The Warren Commission, the Authorities & the Report. Indianapolis: Bobbs-Merrill. 1967. LCCN 67025176.
- Accessories After the Fact: The Warren Commission, the Authorities & the Report. New York: Vintage Books. 1976. ISBN 978-0394716305. Reprint edition with Preface by Senator Richard Schweiker and Introduction by Peter Dale Scott.
- Master Index to the J.F.K. Assassination Investigation: The Reports and Supporting Volumes of the House Select Committee on Assassinations and the Warren Commission. Metuchen, New Jersey: Scarecrow Press. 1980. ISBN 978-0810813311. Co-authored with Gary Owens.

=== Selected articles ===
- "The Limits of the Warren Investigation" (PDF). The Minority of One. July–August 1966.
- "How Well Did the 'Non-Driver' Oswald Drive?" (PDF). The Minority of One. September 1966.
- "Notes for a New Investigation". Esquire. December 1, 1966.
- "Two Assassinations" (PDF). The Minority of One. June 1968.
- "The Curious Testimony of Mr. Givens" (PDF). The Texas Observer. August 13, 1971.
