= Apastepeque =

- Municipality
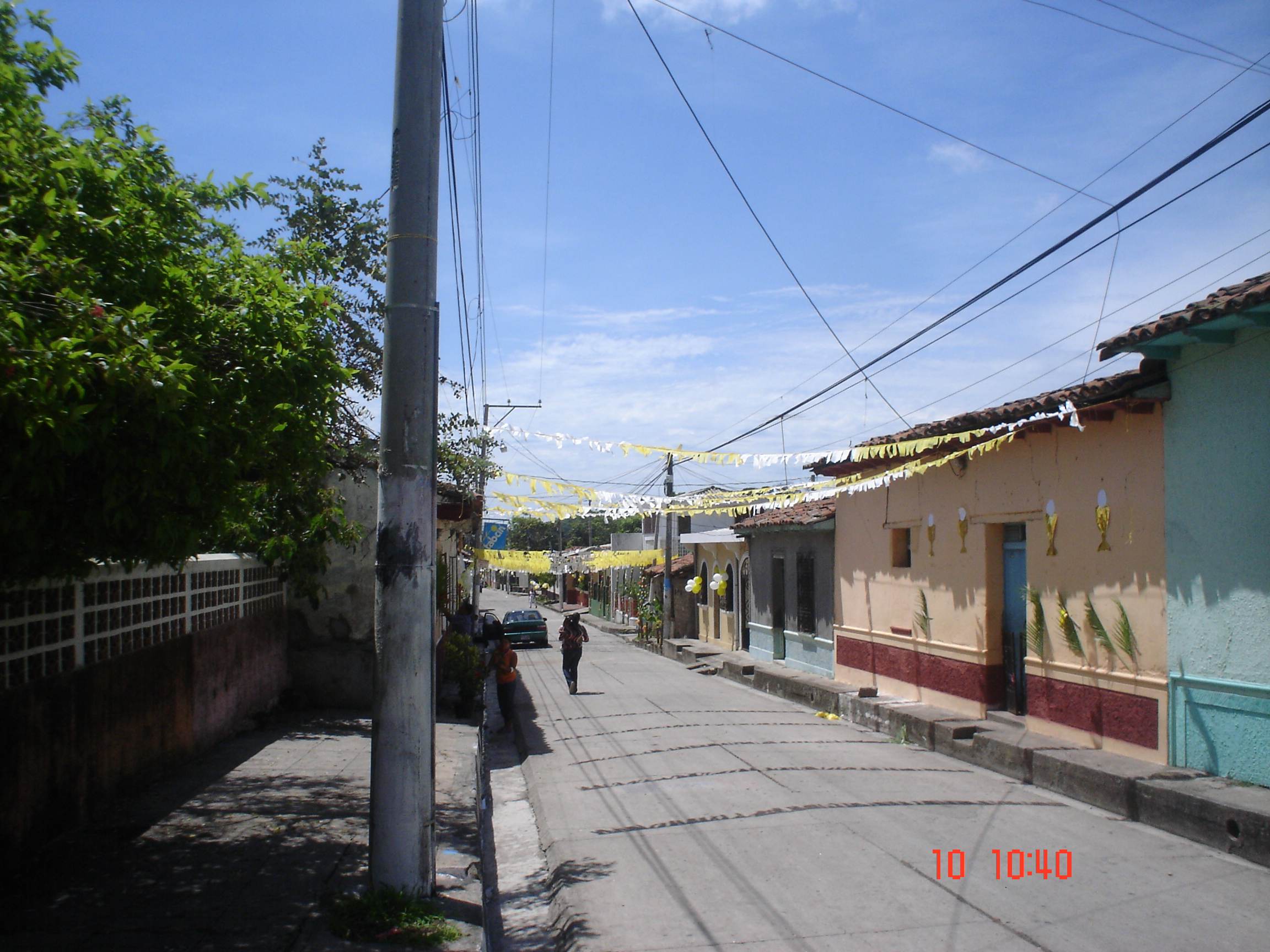
- Raimundo Lazo Street on Corpus Christi day

- Location in El Salvador
- Coordinates: 13°40′N 88°46′W
- Country: El Salvador
- Department: San Vicente Department

Government
  - Patron: Santiago Apostol

Population
  - Total: 19,895

Apastepeque is a municipality in the San Vicente Department, El Salvador. It is located approximately 50 km east of San Salvador and approximately 6 km from San Vicente. The town has approximately 10,000 residents with 19,895 in municipality.

The town is known for its fiestas and cultural traditions throughout the year, starting in January with Fiesta de los Moros, in May, Santa Rita's festivities, in July the patron Santiago, and in December, the annual Christmas carnaval.

== Geography ==
Apastepeque is a municipality of the San Vicente Department. It is located towards the southeast of the centre of the country to the east of San Salvador and lies at an altitude of 590 m. Bordering to the north is the municipality of San Esteban Catarina, to the north east the municipality of Santa Clara, to the east with San Ildefonso, to the south with Ciudad de San Vicente (the department capital) and to the west with the municipality of San Cayetano Istepeque. It is 6 km from Ciudad de San Vicente and 58 km from San Salvador.

== Arts and culture ==
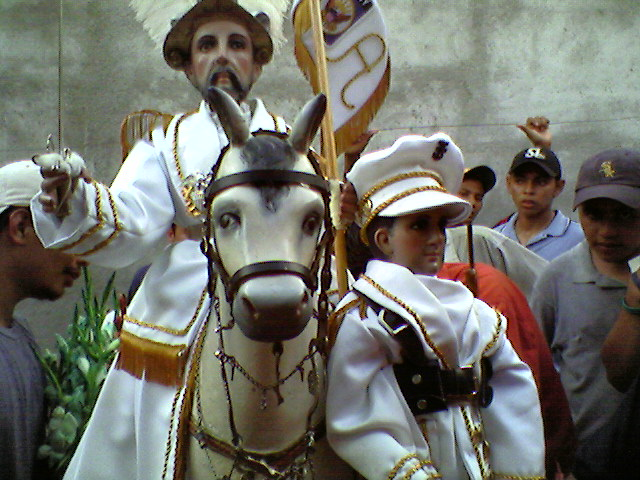
Saint James the Great (Santiago apóstol), the patron saint of Apastepeque.

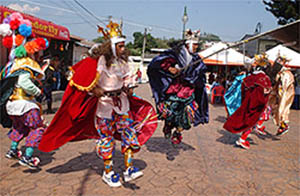
The dance of the Moors and the Christians, a dance dating back to colonial times

Apastepeque is a city with a rich religious and cultural tradition and character that fuses together the elements of pre and colonial influences with those of the new generation. One of the monuments in Apastepeque of great renown is the church that was built during the colonial period. However it has been damaged several times due to earthquakes and recently underwent a reconstruction after the 2001 disaster. Notable fiestas are celebrated in the city such as that between 16 and July 25 in honor of the patron saint Saint James the Great (Santiago Apóstol), where they indulge in much religious, cultural and social activity such as masquerades, dances and concerts.

In the Nahuatl language, Apastepeque means “Hill of the Alabastro”. Alabastro is a type of limestone. In the Nahuatl language, Saguayapa, a settlement adjacent to the main town means “Rivers of frogs and sands”. These twin towns, are separated by the Raymundo Street to the north of the parochial church Santiago Apóstol. The north part is occupied by Saguayapa and the south part by Apastepeque. Apastepeque celebrates many celebrations annually, initiating in the month of January to honor San Sebastián Martyr. This festival is regarded as the second most important in the city and the dances of the Moors and Christians which are deeply engrained in the history of the city are performed to celebrate the event.

== Economy ==
Traditionally, the economy of the city has been based on agriculture, mostly subsistence farming and cultivation Sugar cane forms a crucial pillar of the economy. The sugar cane is appreciated not only as a food product but for its medicinal qualities.
