= Santa Clara Municipality =

Santa Clara Municipality may refer to:

- Santa Clara Municipality, Durango
- Santa Clara, San Vicente, municipality in El Salvador
