= Juan Pablo Torres =

Juan Pablo Torres may refer to:

- Juan Pablo Torres (musician) (1946–2005), Cuban trombonist, bandleader, arranger and producer
- Juan Pablo Torres (soccer) (born 1999), American soccer player

== See also ==
- Juan Torres (disambiguation)
