= Santo Domingo, El Salvador =

Santo Domingo
- Municipality
- Interactive map of Santo Domingo
- Coordinates: 13°43′07″N 88°51′23″W
- Country: El Salvador
- Department: San Vicente Department
- Elevation: 1,896 ft (578 m)

Santo Domingo is a municipality in the San Vicente department of El Salvador. It is located about 30 miles (48 km) east of San Vicente.

== Education ==
The town has two main schools, which all the underage children attend. The schools are Ana Guerra de Jesus, which is a Catholic founded, religious school. The teachers are nuns and the students must attend mass everyday to follow the guidelines of the school. Also, the seminar in the South part of the school is composed of students who want to follow a career as a teacher in a Catholic school. The second school, Escuela Municipal, called Esteban Castro, is a smaller school where a general education is provided to the students attending. In both schools a uniform is required. The uniform for the school, Ana Guerra de Jesus, has a more conservative look than the Escuela Mucnicipal. The colors depend on the school and the guidelines for wearing them, too. The town is composed of about 97% Catholic, less than 3% is Protestant or Christian. That is the reason why the town has a huge church beside Ana Guerra de Jesus. The 3% of Protestants attend home churches or gather in small dining areas. As the rest of the country the religious customs are the same.

Santo Domingo is known for its peaceful surroundings. The population is about 17,000. Santo Domingo celebrates its annual festivities from July 28 through August 4 in honor of the town's patron saint Santo Domingo De Guzman.
