= Pablo Ríos =

Salvadoran singer (1933–2006)

- Born: Juan Pablo Torres Amaya; 26 June 1933; Guadeloupe, El Salvador
- Died: 10 January 2006 (aged 72) Mejicanos, El Salvador
- Genres: Boleros, ballads, rancheros
- Occupation: Singer
- Instrument: Voice
- Years active: 1946–2006

Juan Pablo Torres Amaya, known by his stage name Pablo Ríos (26 June 1933 – 10 January 2006), was a Salvadoran romantic singer.

== Biography ==
Juan Pablo Torres Amaya was born on 26 June 1933 in Guadeloupe, San Vicente, El Salvador. At the age of 13, he began his passion of singing to women, generally singing romantic boleros, ballads, and rancheros.

He won first place at the Central American and Caribbean Song Festival three times in a row, winning the first with his song Odio. To celebrate 50 years of his music, various radio stations and Channel 10 aired special programs with his music.

He died to prostate cancer on 10 January 2006 in the Zacamil Hospital in Mejicanos, El Salvador.

== Albums ==
- 52 Años de Romance (1999)
