= Juan Torres =

Juan Torres may refer to:

- Juan de Torres, founder of Baclayon Church in Philippines in 1596
- Juan Torres de Vera y Aragón, first settler in Avellaneda, Buenos Aires in 1620
- Juan Torres Ribas, leader of Roman Catholic Diocese of Menorca in 1902–1939
- Juan Torres, American baseball player, most valuable player in 1939 Amateur World Series
- Juan José Torres (1920–1976), Bolivian socialist president
- Juan Fremiot Torres Oliver (1925–2012), Catholic bishop in Puerto Rico
- Juan Torres (weightlifter), Cuban weightlifter
- Juan Ignacio Torres Landa (1959–2013), Mexican politician
- Juan José Torres (athlete), Spanish runner
- Juan Torres Odelín, Cuban boxer
- Juan Camilo Torres, winner of 2013 Colombian Chess Championship
- Juan Sablan Torres, unsuccessful vice-governor candidate in Northern Mariana Islands gubernatorial election, 2014
- Juan Manuel Torres (born 1985), Argentine footballer
- Juan A. Torres, entomologist who researched fauna of Puerto Rico
- Juan Antonio Torres (born 1968), Mexican footballer
- Juan David Torres (born 2001), Colombian footballer
- Juan Pablo Torres (musician) (1946–2005), Cuban musician and producer
- Juan Pablo Torres (soccer) (born 1999), American soccer player

== See also ==
- Alfredo Torres (Juan Alfredo Torres González, born 1931), Mexican footballer
- Jorge Torres (baseball) (Jorge Juan Torres, 1918–1982), Cuban baseball player
- Pablo Ríos (born Juan Pablo Torres Amaya, 1934–2006), Salvadorian singer
- Tico Torres (Héctor Samuel Juan Torres, born 1953), American drummer
- Juanfran (footballer, born 1985) (Juan Francisco Torres Belén), Spanish footballer
