= Mayella Mena =

Salvadoran beauty pageant winner

- Born: Mayella Mena; June 1, 1988 (age 38); San Salvador, El Salvador
- Beauty pageant titleholder
- Title: Miss El Salvador Universe 2009

Mayella Mena (born June 1, 1988) is a Salvadoran model and beauty pageant titleholder who won the Miss El Salvador Universe 2009, successor to Rebeca Moreno and represented her country at Miss Universe 2009.

Awards and achievements
Preceded by Rebeca Moreno	Nuestra Belleza El Salvador; 2009	Succeeded by Sonia Cruz
Preceded by Rebeca Moreno	Miss Continente Americano El Salvador; 2009	Succeeded by Sonia Cruz
