= Sonia Cruz =

Salvadoran beauty pageant titleholder

- Born: Sonia Yesenia Cruz Ayala c. 1990 (age 35–36)
- Height: 1.73 m (5 ft 8 in)
- Beauty pageant titleholder
- Title: Nuestra Belleza El Salvador 2010
- Hair color: Brown
- Eye color: Brown
- Major competitions: Nuestra Belleza El Salvador 2010 (Winner); Miss Universe 2010; Miss Continente Americano 2010

Sonia Yesenia Cruz Ayala (born c. 1990) is a Salvadoran beauty pageant titleholder who was crowned Nuestra Belleza El Salvador 2010 and represented her country in the 2010 Miss Universe pageant.

== Early life ==
A resident of San Salvador, Cruz is pursuing a bachelor's degree in business management at Universidad Centroamericana "José Simeón Cañas" and will graduate in 2012.

Prior to her participation in Nuestra Belleza El Salvador, Cruz was elected queen of Fiestas Agustinas, a traditional Salvadoran festivity in memory of the Transfiguration of Jesus.

== Nuestra Belleza El Salvador 2010 ==
Cruz, who stands 1.73 m (5 ft 8 in) tall, competed as one of 15 finalists in her country's national beauty pageant, Nuestra Belleza El Salvador, held on June 25, 2010, at Telecorporación Salvadoreña studios in San Salvador, where she became the eventual winner of the title, gaining the right to represent El Salvador in Miss Universe 2010.

== Miss Universe 2010 ==
As the official representative of her country to the 2010 Miss Universe pageant broadcast live from Paradise, Nevada on August 23, Cruz participated as one of 83 delegates who vied for the crown of eventual winner, Ximena Navarrete of Mexico.

== Miss Continente Americano 2010 ==
After Miss Universe 2010, Cruz represented El Salvador in Miss Continente Americano 2010, held on September 18, 2010, in Guayaquil, Ecuador.

Awards and achievements
Preceded by Mayella Mena	Nuestra Belleza El Salvador; 2010	Succeeded by Mayra Aldana
