= Bosque La Joya =

Forest

Coordinates: 13°32′50″N 88°44′6″W

Bosque La Joya is a forest in the departamento of San Vicente, El Salvador. It lies to the east of Tecoluca and to the west of the Lempa River.
