= Santa Clara, El Salvador =

Santa Clara
- Municipality
- Location in El Salvador
- Coordinates: 13°42′N 88°44′W
- Country: El Salvador
- Department: San Vicente Department
- Elevation: 1,919 ft (585 m)

Santa Clara is a municipality in the San Vicente Department of El Salvador. It is located approximately 50 kilometers (31 mi) east of San Salvador and approximately 8 kilometers (5.0 mi) from San Vicente. The municipality has approximately 9,750 residents.

The town is known for its fiestas and cultural traditions throughout the year, starting in August with Fiestas Patronales, in July the patron San Jose, and in December, the annual Christmas carnaval.

== Geography ==
Santa Clara is a municipality of the San Vicente Department. It is located towards the southeast of the centre of the country to the east of San Salvador and lies at an altitude of 590m. Bordering to the north is the municipality of San Esteban Catarina to the north east the municipality of Apastepeque, to the east with San Ildefonso, to the south with Ciudad de San Vicente (the department capital) and to the west with the municipality of San Cayetano Istepeque. It is 6 km from Ciudad de San Vicente and 60 km from San Salvador.

== History ==
In July 1982, three civil defensemen were killed in an attack on Santa Clara by the Farabundo Martí National Liberation Front.

== Arts and culture ==
Saint James the Great (Santiago apóstol) is the patron saint of Santa Clara. Santa Clara is a town with a rich religious and cultural tradition and character that fuses together the elements of precolonial and colonial influences with those of the new generation. One of the monuments in Santa Clara of great renown is the church that was built during the colonial period. However, it has been damaged several times due to earthquakes and recently underwent a reconstruction after the 2001 disaster. Notable fiestas are celebrated in the city such as that between August 12 to the 25 in honor of the patrona saint Saint Santa Clarita de Asis (Santiago Apóstol), where they indulge in much religious, cultural and social activity such as masquerades, dances and concerts.

== Economy ==
Traditionally, the economy of the city has been based on agriculture, mostly subsistence farming and cultivation. Sugar cane forms a crucial pillar of the economy. The sugar cane is appreciated not only as a food product but for its medicinal qualities.
