= Cinquera =

- District
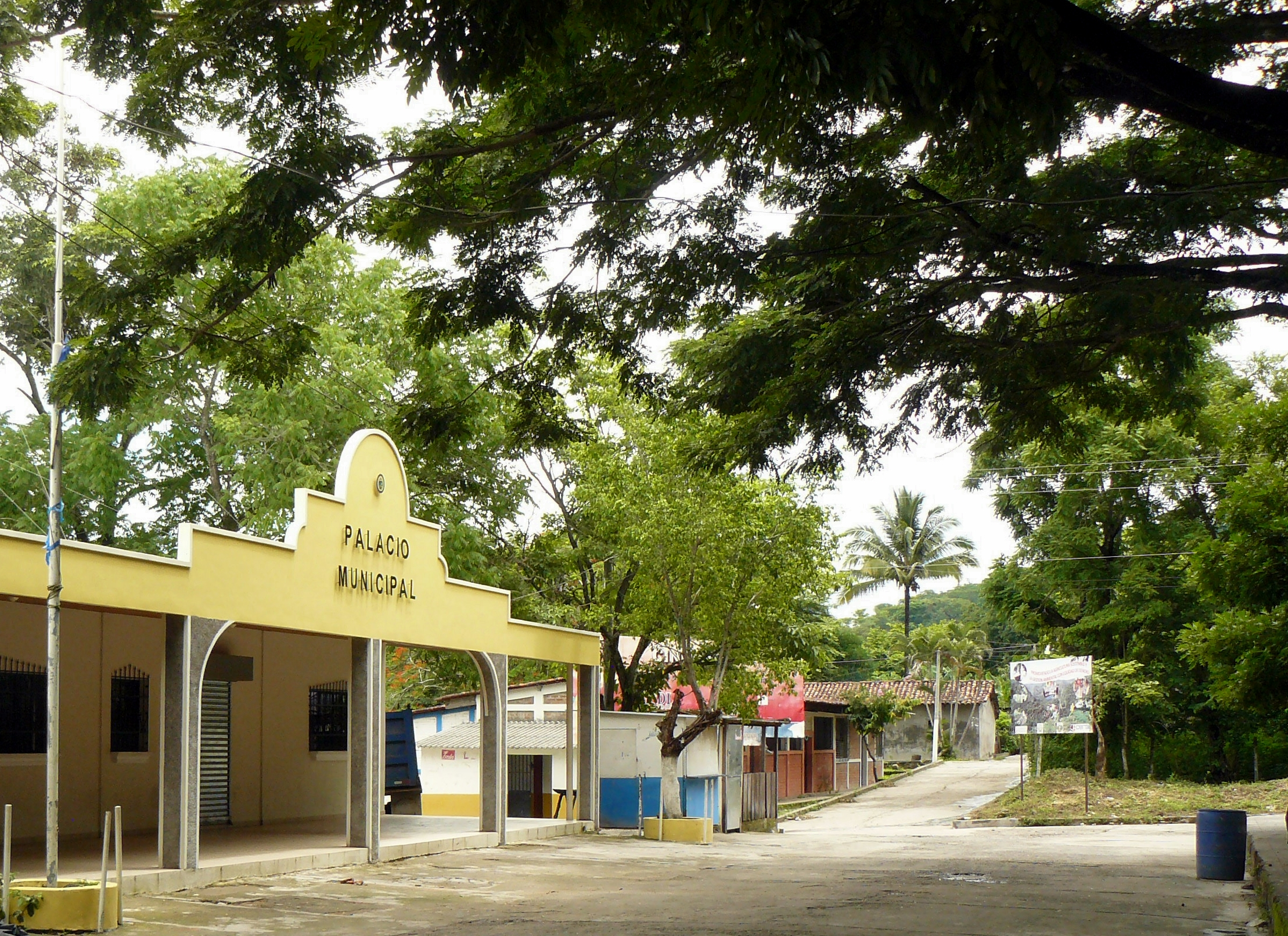

- Location of Cinquera in Cabañas Department

- Location in El Salvador
- Coordinates: 13°53′N 88°58′W
- Country: El Salvador
- Department: Cabañas
- Municipality: Cabañas Oeste

Government
  - Mayor: Lorenzo Rivas (GANA)

Area
  - District: 13.32 sq mi (34.51 km^{2})
- Elevation: 1,467 ft (447 m)

Population (2024)
  - District: 2,096
  - Rank: 248th in El Salvador
  - Rural: 2,096

Cinquera is a district in the Cabañas Department of El Salvador.

== Local attractions ==
- Hostal de Cinquera (translation: Hostel of Cinquera)
- Memorial de el conflicto armado Park (translation: memorial of the armed conflict park)
- las flores Park (translation: the flowers park)
- Iglesia Catolica de Cinquera (translation: Catholic Church of Cinquera)

== Cinquera Ecological Park ==
Cinquera Ecological Park is a former base for guerrilla bands during the civil war and is now a conservation region.

The area around the town of Cinquera, 18km from Suchitoto in northern El Salvador saw heavy fighting during the civil war. Many inhabitants left the area, and the guerrillas moved in. Their bases came under attack from the army and they took shelter within the forest. After the war, the returning population began clearing woodland for agriculture.

An ecological reserve was established to conserve the remaining native vegetation. It contains vestiges of the war, including the rebel hospital and kitchen. Guided walks are available with local guides, many of whom are former guerrillas.
