= Tejutepeque =

- District
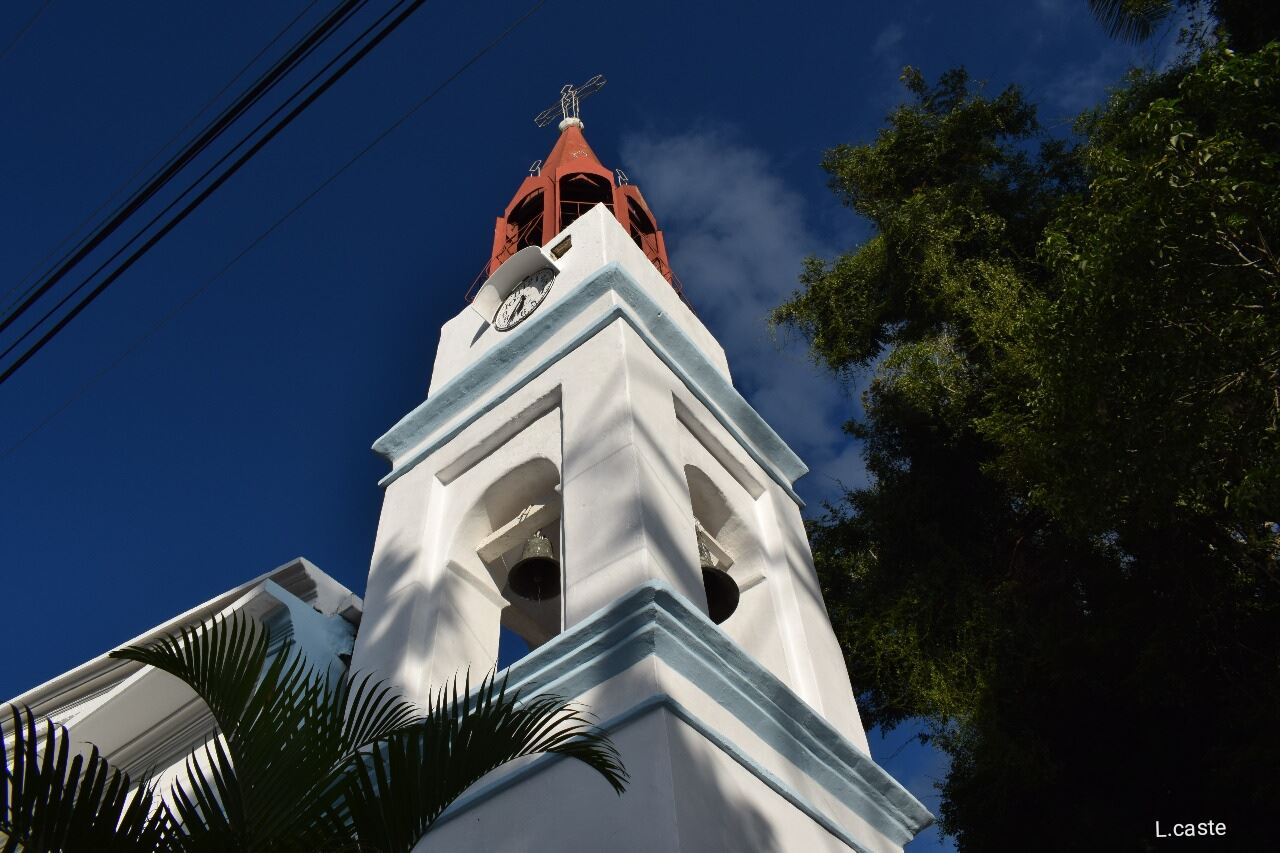

- Location of Tejutepeque in Cabañas Department

- Location in El Salvador
- Coordinates: 13°51′N 88°54′W
- Country: El Salvador
- Department: Cabañas
- Municipality: Cabañas Oeste
- Elevation: 2,277 ft (694 m)

Population (2024)
  - District: 7,189
  - Rank: 164th in El Salvador
  - Rural: 7,189
  - Summer (DST): -06:00 GMT

Tejutepeque is a district in the Cabañas Department of El Salvador. It has a population of 20,000.

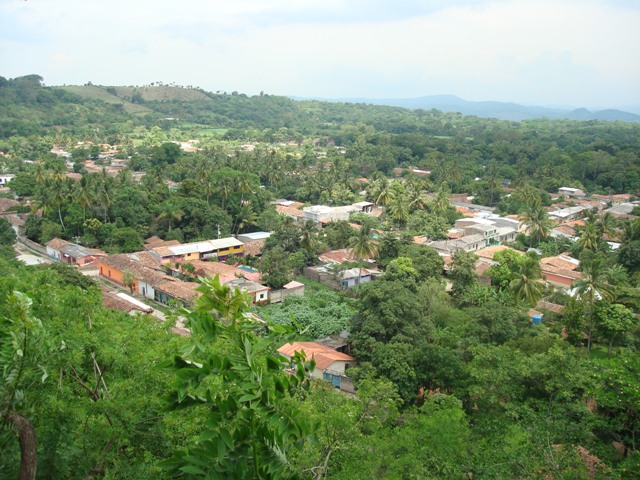
Tejutepeque

== History ==
Tejutepeque is thought to be one of 59 surviving settlements that already existed in 1524 when the Spanish first arrived in what is now El Salvador. It became a municipality in 1847 and was incorporated into Cabañas in 1873, having formerly been part of the Cuscatlán department. It officially became a town in 1879 and a city in 1996.

The name of the municipality is composed of the Nahuat words “tejut” or “texut” meaning “embers”, and “tepec” meaning “hill or mountain”: “Ember Mountain”

== Traditions ==
Each October, the municipality has festivities in honor of its patron saint, Saint Raphael the Archangel. It also holds a special procession on Palm Sunday.
