= Guadalupe, El Salvador =

Guadalupe
- Municipality
- Location in El Salvador
- Coordinates: 13°37′N 88°52′W
- Country: El Salvador
- Department: San Vicente Department

Area
  - Total: 8.31 sq mi (21.51 km^{2})
- Elevation: 2,595 ft (791 m)

Population
  - Total: 6,369

Guadalupe is a municipality in the San Vicente department of El Salvador.

Guadalupe is a small town.

Guadalupe has one Catholic church, one high school (secundaria), one elementary school (primaria), one clinic only open on certain days of the week.
