= Guacotecti =

- District
- Location of Guacotecti in Cabañas Department

- Location in El Salvador
- Coordinates: 13°52′N 88°39′W
- Country: El Salvador
- Department: Cabañas
- Municipality: Cabañas Este
- Elevation: 2,070 ft (630 m)

Population (2024)
  - District: 7,585
  - Rank: 154th in El Salvador
  - Urban: 5,654
  - Rural: 1,931

Guacotecti is a district in the Cabañas Department of El Salvador.

== History ==
Guacotecti existed in the first half of the 16th century when Spaniards arrived. Although founded and inhabited by Lenca tribes, Guacotecti was conquered at the end of the 15th century by Yaqui or Pipil warriors. Guacotecti, in Nahuatl language, means "High Priest of the Treasures".
