= Sensuntepeque =

Capital district of Cabañas Department, El Salvador

- District
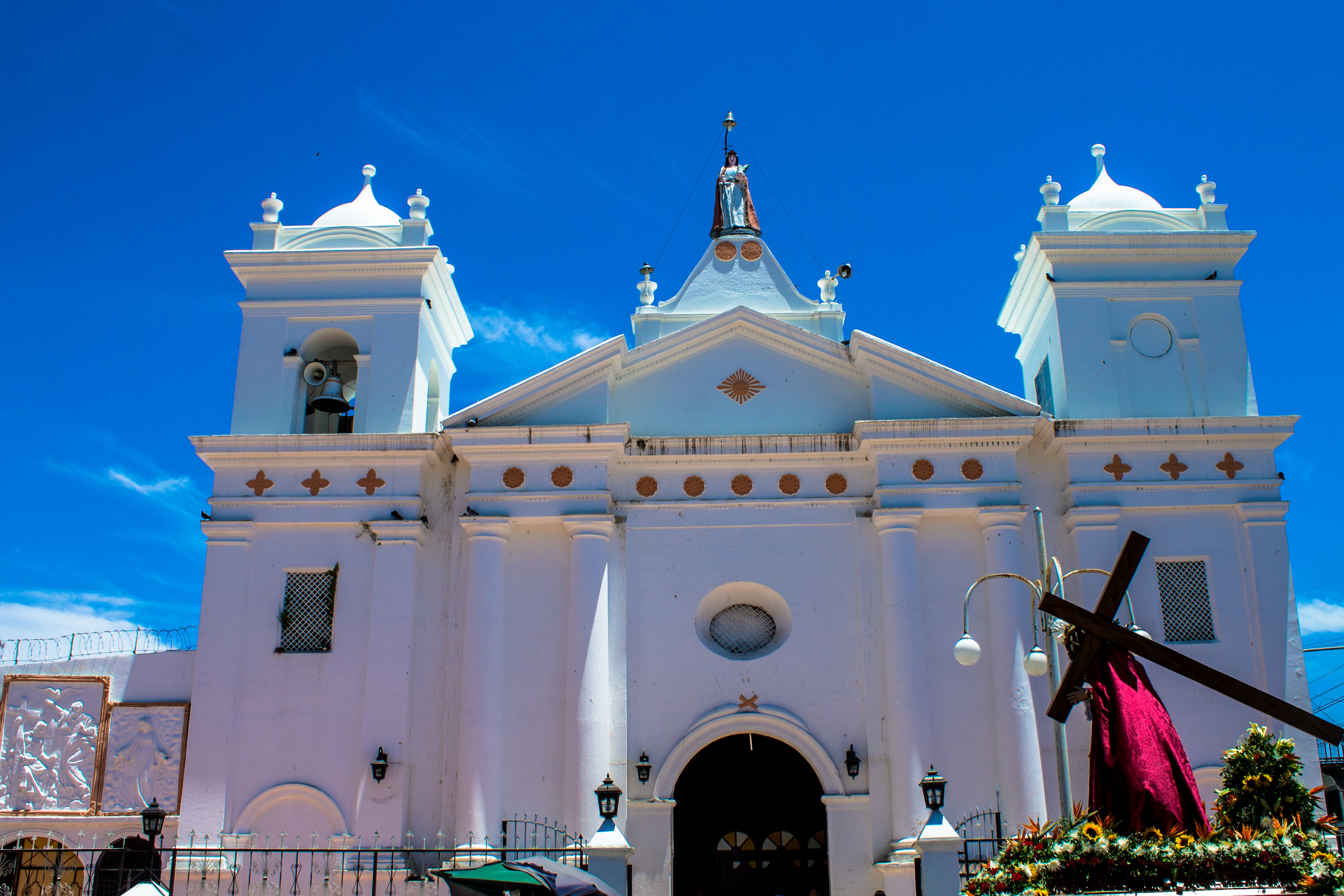
- Santa Bárbara parochial church

- Location of Sensuntepeque (district) in Cabañas Department (above) and of Sensuntepeque City in El Salvador (below)

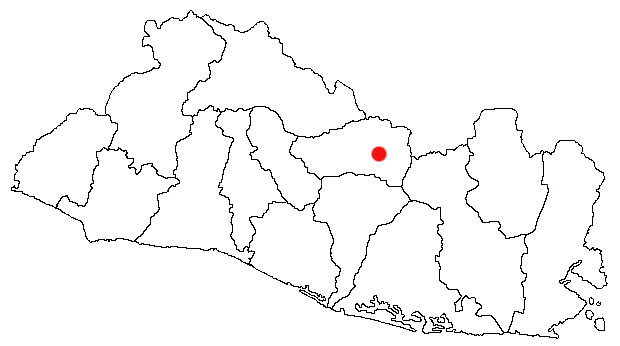

- Location within El Salvador
- Coordinates: 13°52′N 88°38′W
- Country: El Salvador
- Department: Cabañas
- Municipality: Cabañas Este
- Founded: 1550

Area
  - District: 306.33 km^{2} (118.27 sq mi)
- Elevation: 820 m (2,690 ft)

Population (2024)
  - District: 35,916
  - Rank: 40th in El Salvador
  - Density: 117.25/km^{2} (303.67/sq mi)
  - Urban: 14,421
  - Rural: 21,495
- Postal code: 1201

Sensuntepeque (Spanish pronunciation: [sensunteˈpeke]) is a city and district in the Cabañas Department of El Salvador. It is the capital of the department and principal town in the area. Sensuntepeque is located about 83 kilometres (52 mi) northeast of the capital, San Salvador, at an altitude of 820 metres (2,690 ft).

== History ==
In the local Pipil language (also called "Nawat", and similar to Nahuatl), Sensuntepeque means "400 Hills" or "Many Mountains." The name refers to the many hills in the region. The area was first inhabited by the Lenca people. However, the town itself was founded as a Pipil people village in 1550, and in 1799 it became head of the party of Titihuapa. Colonized by the Spanish, it became an evangelical village. On December 20, 1811, its population rose against Spanish colonial rule. It proclaimed independence in 1821, during the government of José María Cornejo (1829-1832) and formally raised its status to that of a town.

In March 1871, the town was raided by Salvadorian Liberals with Honduran Army backing after Honduras declared war on El Salvador.

In 1948 the town had a population of about 8,000 people. During the war in El Salvador, the road between Sensuntepeque and Ilobasco was important for communications in the area, and one or two patrols a day were made with 25-30 soldiers in the mid-1980s.

In 2013, the Archangel St. Michael Catholic School in the El Nazareno colonia added new classrooms and renovated some of the older buildings; this occurred with the financial assistance of the Japanese government. In April 2013, sellers on several main streets at the entrance to the city were evicted by local employees. They moved to new stalls, measuring 1.5 metres (4 ft 11 in), in the area designated for trade. The move was necessitated by civic construction projects, such as renovation of the bus terminal, and the addition of street signs and crosswalks.

== Geography and demographics ==
Sensuntepeque is located about 83 kilometres (52 mi) northeast of the capital, San Salvador and about 27 kilometres (17 mi) northeast of Ilobasco, in northern central El Salvador. It is situated on the southern declivity of Pelón mountain at an altitude of 820 metres (2,690 ft), and covers an area of 306.33 square kilometres (118.27 sq mi). It is geographically distributed into 22 cantons and 236 rural villages. The urban area is divided into four barrios and 28 colonias. Nearby springs include Catorce de Julio, 0.25 miles (0.40 km) to the south, La Mina, 0.25 miles (0.40 km) to the northwest, and El Chorro, 0.25 miles (0.40 km) to the north. Notable landmarks are the Town Hall, a prison, several churches, and a park. It has a population of about 45,000 inhabitants, up from approximately 8,000 inhabitants in 1951. Initially, the water supply was from a springs known as Catorce de Julio (fourteenth of July springs about 1 mile away from the city in the head reaches of a valley)) which provided 12,000 gallons of water per day. Many other springs have been tapped since then to meet the growing water supply needs of the city.

The city's scenic setting is an attraction to visitors. The road to the city passes winding through hills and valleys.

=== Climate ===
The city has a salubrious climate. The climate data for Sensuntepeque, the capital of the region, is given below.

Climate data for Sensuntepeque (1991–2020)
Month	Jan	Feb	Mar	Apr	May	Jun	Jul	Aug	Sep	Oct	Nov	Dec	Year
Mean daily maximum °C (°F)	31.7 (89.1)	33.2 (91.8)	34.2 (93.6)	34.3 (93.7)	32.1 (89.8)	30.9 (87.6)	31.3 (88.3)	31.3 (88.3)	30.5 (86.9)	30.1 (86.2)	30.4 (86.7)	31.1 (88.0)	31.8 (89.2)
Daily mean °C (°F)	22.9 (73.2)	23.9 (75.0)	24.8 (76.6)	25.7 (78.3)	25.1 (77.2)	24.3 (75.7)	24.2 (75.6)	24.1 (75.4)	23.8 (74.8)	23.6 (74.5)	22.9 (73.2)	22.7 (72.9)	24.0 (75.2)
Mean daily minimum °C (°F)	15.5 (59.9)	16.0 (60.8)	17.2 (63.0)	19.1 (66.4)	20.1 (68.2)	19.7 (67.5)	19.0 (66.2)	19.1 (66.4)	19.3 (66.7)	19.0 (66.2)	17.1 (62.8)	15.8 (60.4)	18.1 (64.6)
Average precipitation mm (inches)	2.5 (0.10)	3.0 (0.12)	18.6 (0.73)	59.8 (2.35)	257.9 (10.15)	290.5 (11.44)	282.5 (11.12)	306.7 (12.07)	375.2 (14.77)	268.3 (10.56)	62.5 (2.46)	9.6 (0.38)	1,937 (76.26)
Average relative humidity (%)	75	72	71	74	82	86	85	86	88	87	82	79	80.8
Source: Ministerio de Medio Ambiente y Recursos Naturales

== Economy ==
The economy of the city in colonial times was based on producing indigo. Crops grown today include coffee, sugarcane, henequen, and grains.
