= Cabañas Department =

Department of El Salvador

Cabañas
- Department
- Flag

- Location within El Salvador
- Coordinates: 13°53′49″N 88°42′32″W
- Country: El Salvador
- Created: 1873
- Capital: Sensuntepeque
- Largest city: Ilobasco

Area
  - Total: 1,103.5 km^{2} (426.1 sq mi)
  - Rank: Ranked 12th
- Highest elevation: 1,014 m (3,327 ft)
- Lowest elevation: 50 m (160 ft)

Population (2013)
  - Total: 164,945
  - Rank: Ranked 14th
  - Density: 149.47/km^{2} (387.14/sq mi)
- Time zone: UTC−6 (CST)
- ISO 3166 code: SV-CA

Cabañas (Spanish pronunciation: [kaˈβaɲas]) is a department of El Salvador in the north central part of the country. Its capital is Sensuntepeque and it is one of coldest parts of El Salvador. Classified as a department in February 1873, it covers an area of 1,103.5 km^{2} (426.1 sq mi) and has over 164,900 inhabitants. The other major city of the department is Ilobasco. Agricultural produce includes coffee, sugar cane and sesame seeds, as well as dairy products. Gold, silver and copper are the principal minerals mined in the department. Its main industrial activity is oriented to manufacture of potteries, cheese, lime and distilleries.

== History ==
The department takes its name from the Central-American hero General José Trinidad Cabañas who served as a minister in El Salvador in his later life. From the early 18th century, the town of Ilobasco, one of the oldest pottery centres of El Salvador, attracted Creole and Spanish inhabitants, many of which were of Cuban origin. The blue dye indigo has also been produced there in substantial quantities since at least 1735.

By the beginning of the 19th century, Ilobasco was a thriving community with the establishment of markets, pharmacies, blacksmiths and saddlers. Tourists have recently been attracted to Ilobasco where clay dolls and other types of pottery are a major attraction in addition to a lakeside recreation area. By the early 20th century, the department had two cities, Sensuntepeque and Ilobasco, as well as five towns, Victoria, Dolores, San Isidro, Jutiapa, and Tejutepeque. The Flag of the Cabañas Department is made up of blue-red colours painted vertically and separated by a S-like wavy white line.

== Geography ==
Cabañas Department is located in the northern centre of the country, bordered on the north by the Chalatenango Department, to the northeast by Honduras, on the east by the San Miguel Department, to the south by the San Vicente Department, and to the west by the Cuscatlán Department. Of note is the 88 kilometres (55 mi) long Lempa River (88 kilometres (55 mi)), reservoirs of the Cerrón Grande hydroelectric dam, the La Cruz hills (921 metres (3,022 ft)) and the Ocotillo (1,014 metres (3,327 ft)). The department includes parts of the highland district of Cojutepeque and shares a border with the plateau district in the west. Small streams drain from the Jiboa River, Titihuapa River, and Acahuapa River, while others drain to the Lempa River. Most of the area consists of mountain ranges and chains, though the eastern and northern parts of the Department are desolate. There are also fertile valleys, which produce agricultural crops such as indigo, rice, corn, and many other grains.

=== Climate ===
The climate data is given below for Sensuntepeque which is capital of the region.

Climate data for Sensuntepeque, Cabañas (El Salvador)
| Month | Jan | Feb | Mar | Apr | May | Jun | Jul | Aug | Sep | Oct | Nov | Dec | Year |
|---|---|---|---|---|---|---|---|---|---|---|---|---|---|
| Mean daily maximum °C (°F) | 30.3 (86.5) | 30.1 (86.2) | 32 (90) | 32.2 (90.0) | 30.8 (87.4) | 29.5 (85.1) | 30.1 (86.2) | 30 (86) | 29 (84) | 29.1 (84.4) | 29.0 (84.2) | 29.5 (85.1) | 32.2 (90.0) |
| Daily mean °C (°F) | 22.2 (72.0) | 22.8 (73.0) | 23.8 (74.8) | 24.5 (76.1) | 24.2 (75.6) | 23.3 (73.9) | 23.3 (73.9) | 23.2 (73.8) | 22.8 (73.0) | 22.8 (73.0) | 22.4 (72.3) | 22.0 (71.6) | 22 (72) |
| Mean daily minimum °C (°F) | 16.3 (61.3) | 16.8 (62.2) | 17.7 (63.9) | 19 (66) | 20.0 (68.0) | 19.60 (67.28) | 19.10 (66.38) | 19.3 (66.7) | 19.4 (66.9) | 19.00 (66.20) | 17.90 (64.22) | 16.90 (62.42) | 16.90 (62.42) |

== Festival ==
The most popular festival is the Santa Barbara festival which is held on the 4 December every year. On this occasion, a fair is also held when the commerce activity is at its peak.

=== Municipalities ===
1. Cabañas Este
2. Cabañas Oeste

== Districts ==
1. Cinquera
2. Dolores
3. Guacotecti
4. Ilobasco
5. Jutiapa
6. San Isidro
7. Sensuntepeque
8. Tejutepeque
9. Victoria

== Demography ==
Cabañas Department has an area of 1,103.51 square kilometres (426.07 sq mi), of which 1,099.91 square kilometres (424.68 sq mi) is rural and 3.60 square kilometres (1.39 sq mi) is urban. It has a population of 149,326 inhabitants (70,204 men and 79,122 women) of which 66.7% live in rural areas. Of the 149,326 inhabitants, 23,331 are white people, 124,748 are mestizos, 467 are black people, with indigenous Lenca and Kakawira minorities. The population growth rate is 0.26% per year, the mortality rate is 5.7 per thousand and the fertility rate is 2.8 children per woman. According to the UNDP, the department has the lowest score on the Human Development Index.

== Economy ==
With more than 55 percent of the population being impoverished, the department ranks second in the country for poverty. Cabañas Department is mainly involved in agricultural production, producing basic grains, coffee, sugar cane, indigo, grass, sesame, and is dedicated to raising cattle, pigs, horses, asses, mules and goats. The pottery industry also employs some people as does the gold, silver and copper mining industry. The population of the city of Ilobasco are noted for their arts and crafts. Historically, the Department has also had lime and cheese factories, as well as distilleries.

== Health care ==
Pan American Health Organization in association with the El Salvador Ministry of Health has collaborated on a health project in the Department of Cabañas on a demonstration project for continuous quality improvement of delivery of cervical cancer prevention services among women in the age group of 35 to 59 years.

== Culture ==
The annual fair, on December 4, is the most important day of the year in the Department where people gather in Sensuntepeque to celebrate their patron saints day, Santa Barbara.

== See also ==
- Pacific Rim Mining Corporation
