= Silvia Odio =

Cuban-American testifier (born 1937)

- Born: 1937 (age 88–89); Havana, Cuba
- Known for: Providing testimony to the Warren Commission
- Parent(s): Amador Odio; Sarah Odio

Silvia Odio del Torro (born 1937) is a Cuban-American woman who provided testimony to the Warren Commission investigating the assassination of John F. Kennedy that Lee Harvey Oswald was one of three strangers who visited her Dallas, Texas apartment in September 1963 to solicit money for the anti-Castro group JURE.

== Background ==
Odio was born in Havana, Cuba in 1937, and she remained in Cuba until 1960. She was one of ten children born to Amador and Sarah Odio. Her brother Cesar was a city manager for Miami, Florida for 11 years.

== Warren Commission testimony and investigation ==
On July 22, 1964, Odio provided testimony to Wesley J. Liebeler, assistant counsel of the President's Commission on the Assassination of President Kennedy (known informally as the Warren Commission), at the U.S. Post Office and Courthouse in Dallas.

Odio testified that during the last week of September 1963 three strangers, whom she described as two Latinos and an American, visited her Dallas apartment. They requested that she assist in the preparation of a letter to solicit funds for the Cuban Revolutionary Junta (JURE), the anti-Castro organization to which Odio and her parents belonged. Her father, a former guerilla in Castro's army, was a political prisoner jailed in Cuba for his strong opposition to Castro's communist government.

Odio testified that the men identified themselves by their "war names". She could remember only the name of the talkative one, Leopoldo, who introduced the American to Silvia as Leon Oswald. Leopoldo told her that Oswald, who had been in the Marine Corps and was an excellent shot, could be very useful to JURE. Leopoldo said that they had come from New Orleans and were about to leave on a trip, though he did not specify the destination. Odio did not permit the men to enter her apartment, and she declined their request to translate the letter. She told them that she would first write a letter to her father to ask if he knew of Leopoldo or Angelo. Odio later testified that she was certain that the American was Lee Harvey Oswald.

Odio claimed that later that week, Leopoldo phoned her and said that that Leon had accused the Cubans of cowardice, saying that they "don't have any guts... because President Kennedy should have been assassinated after the Bay of Pigs, and some Cubans should have done that, because he was the one that was holding the freedom of Cuba actually."

The Warren Commission stated in its final report that it had investigated Odio's statements in its efforts to determine whether Oswald was involved in a conspiracy to assassinate Kennedy. (Note: The Warren Commission's report also said that Odio's sister briefly saw the three men when answering the door (and peeking out the living room window) and was also certain that the American was Lee Harvey Oswald.) The commission's investigation showed that Oswald had departed Dallas for New Orleans on April 24, 1963 and lived there until traveling to Mexico City in late September. Oswald was in New Orleans at least until September 23, the day on which Ruth Paine drove Marina Oswald back to Paine's home in the Dallas suburb of Irving. The commission found that Oswald had cashed an unemployment check on September 25, firmly establishing his presence in New Orleans.

The commission held that Oswald may have taken a Continental Trailways bus from New Orleans to Houston on September 25, and that there was "strong evidence" in the form of ticket purchase records and eyewitness reports that he took a bus from Houston to Laredo, Texas on September 26. Other evidence established that Oswald had crossed into Mexico on September 26 and returned across the American border on October 3, the same day on which he returned to Dallas.

The commission noted a window of time between the morning of September 25 and the early morning of September 26 for which it could not account, but stated that it was not plausible or supported by the evidence that Oswald took a car, bus or airplane from New Orleans to Dallas to see Odio and then back to Houston to depart for Laredo in that period of time. It also stated that comments that Oswald had allegedly made to passengers on the bus to Laredo and a telephone call that he placed to a resident in Houston suggest that he was not in Dallas on September 25 but was traveling from New Orleans in a bus. The commission was "almost certain" that Oswald could not have been in Dallas in the time period specified by Odio (although Odio specified no exact date). However, it requested that the FBI conduct further investigation of Odio's testimony, including the possibility that Oswald may have been with others during his trip to Mexico.

In an effort to locate and identify the men whom Odio had said were with Oswald, the FBI interviewed two anti-Castro leaders who denied knowledge of Odio's allegations. Additional investigation, including another interview of Odio, was conducted to find the men who had visited her apartment.

The commission's final report held that the FBI had located a participant in anti-Castro activities, Loran Hall, who stated that he had visited Odio in September 1964 with Larry Howard and William Seymour. The report stated: "While the FBI had not yet completed its investigation into this matter at the time the report went to press, the Commission has concluded that Lee Harvey Oswald was 'not' at Mrs. Odio's apartment in September of 1963."

== House Select Committee on Assassinations investigation ==
The United States House Select Committee on Assassinations (HSCA) stated in its 1979 final report that it had investigated the possibility that anti-Castro Cuban groups and individuals had been involved in the assassination. The committee's report summarized the Warren Commission's findings regarding the Odio incident and stated that general counsel J. Lee Rankin did not receive portions of the FBI's investigation until after the commission's final report had been published.

According to the HSCA, Howard and Seymour denied having met Odio, and Hall later retracted his statement that the three of them had met Odio. The suspicious nature of Loran Hall's confession to the FBI, while substituting William Seymour's name with that of Lee Harvey Oswald, and then the final retraction of his entire confession, was not further explored by the HSCA.

Odio was interviewed by the HSCA, as were her family, her psychiatrist, Hall, Seymour, Larry Howard and the FBI agent who had interviewed Hall.

The HSCA reported that it was "inclined to believe Silvia Odio" and that at least one of the men resembled Oswald. The HSCA did not agree with the Warren Commission that Oswald could not have been in Dallas during the time period specified in Odio's allegations and reported the most likely dates for the encounter to be September 25, 26 or 27, 1963. The committee stated that Oswald's actions and values were consistent with one who would favor the Castro regime, and speculated that Oswald may have associated with anti-Castro activists to implicate movements such as JURE in the assassination or for some unrelated reason.

The HSCA concluded that "it was unable to reach firm conclusions as to the meaning or significance of the Odio incident to the President's assassination."

== Silvia Odio, Loran Hall and Harry Dean ==
Harry Dean, a writer and volunteer FBI informant in Chicago and Southern California, claimed that the two Latinos were actually two of his closest freedom-fighter friends, Cuban-American Loran Hall and Mexican-American Larry Howard. Dean said that Hall regularly used his war name of Lorenzo while Howard's war name was Alonzo.

Dean wrote in his 1990 book Crosstrails that he and the group's leader Guy Gabaldon would solicit cash, medical supplies and paramilitary donations from Southern California members of the John Birch Society and store them in Gabaldon's garage. Dean would then help Hall and Howard load their trailer so that they could drive across the country delivering the donations to anti-Castro paramilitary groups. Dean alleged that Gabaldon issued instructions to Hall and Howard to drive Lee Harvey Oswald from New Orleans to Mexico, and that Loran made a detour to the home of Odio at 8 p.m., most likely on September 26, 1963.
