= Jujutla =

- District
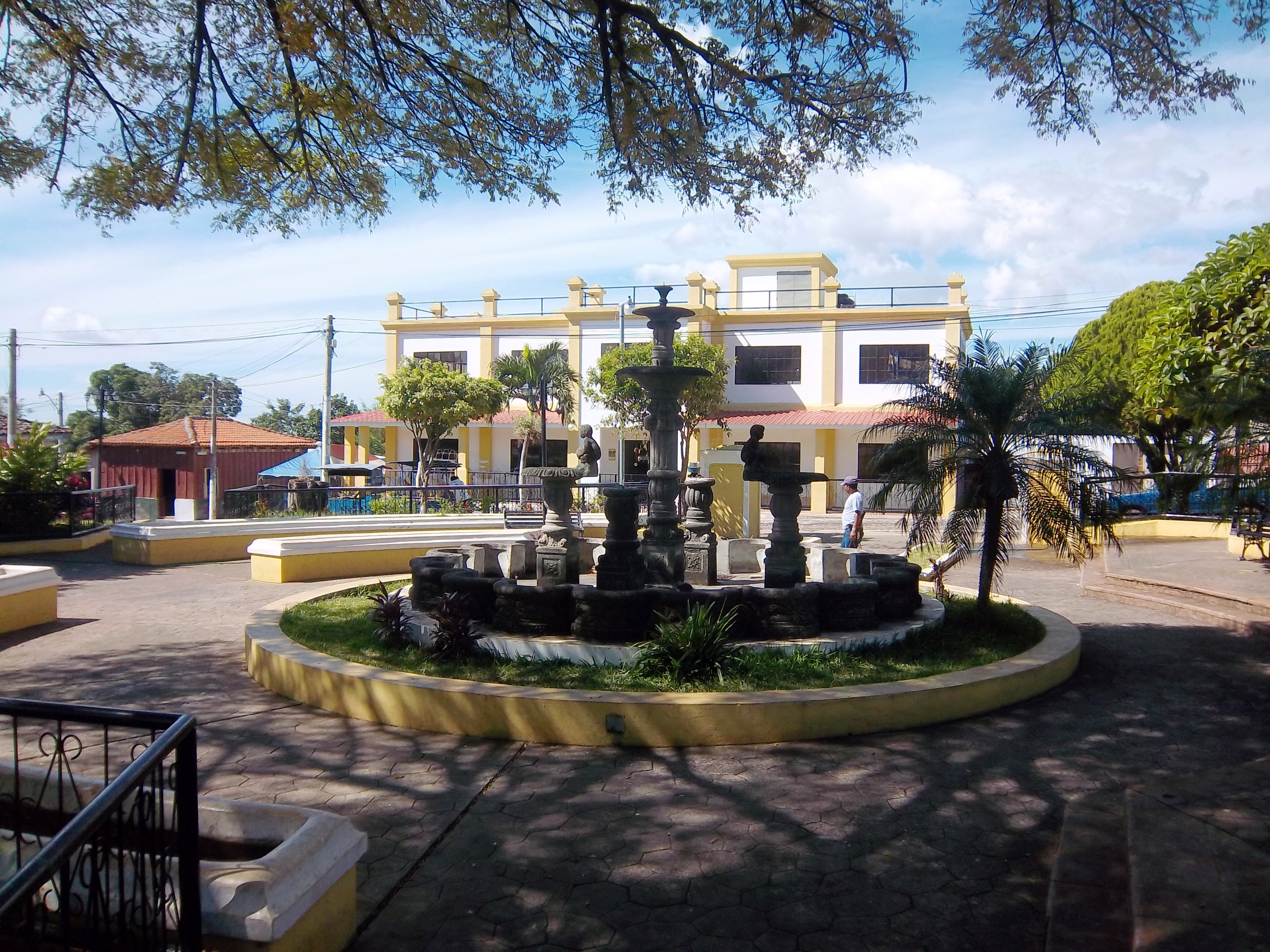

- Location in El Salvador
- Coordinates: 13°47′N 89°51′W
- Country: El Salvador
- Department: Ahuachapán
- Municipality: Ahuachapán Sur

Area
  - District: 101.91 sq mi (263.95 km^{2})
- Elevation: 1,710 ft (520 m)

Population (2024)
  - District: 27,415
  - Rank: 54th in El Salvador
  - Urban: 8,226
  - Rural: 19,189

Jujutla is a district in the Ahuachapán Department of El Salvador.
