= San Cayetano Istepeque =

- District
- Location in El Salvador
- Coordinates: 13°39′N 88°49′W
- Country: El Salvador
- Department: San Vicente Department
- Elevation: 510 m (1,670 ft)

Population (2024)
  - District: 4,184
  - Rank: 209th in El Salvador
  - Urban: 3,255
  - Rural: 929

San Cayetano Istepeque (13°39′N 88°49′W), is a municipality in the San Vicente department of El Salvador. Its altitude is approximately 510 m.
