= Rebeca Moreno =

Salvadoran beauty queen (born 1986)

- Born: Rebeca Moreno; January 16, 1986 (age 40); San Salvador, El Salvador
- Height: 5 ft 3 in (1.60 m)
- Beauty pageant titleholder
- Title: Nuestra Belleza Universo El Salvador 2008
- Hair color: Brown
- Eye color: Green
- Major competitions: Nuestra Belleza Universo El Salvador 2008 (Winner); Miss Universe 2008 (Unplaced)

Rebeca Moreno (born June 17, 1986, in San Salvador, El Salvador) is a Salvadoran beauty pageant titleholder who won the Nuestra Belleza Universo El Salvador pageant in 2008.

She is pursuing her bachelor's degree in mathematics. She was the shortest contestant in Miss Universe 2008 and won the title of Miss Congeniality.

She is an active member of the international peace education organization, CISV International.

Awards and achievements
Preceded by Lissette Rodríguez	Miss Continente Americano El Salvador; 2008	Succeeded by Mayella Mena
