= San Esteban Catarina =

- Municipality
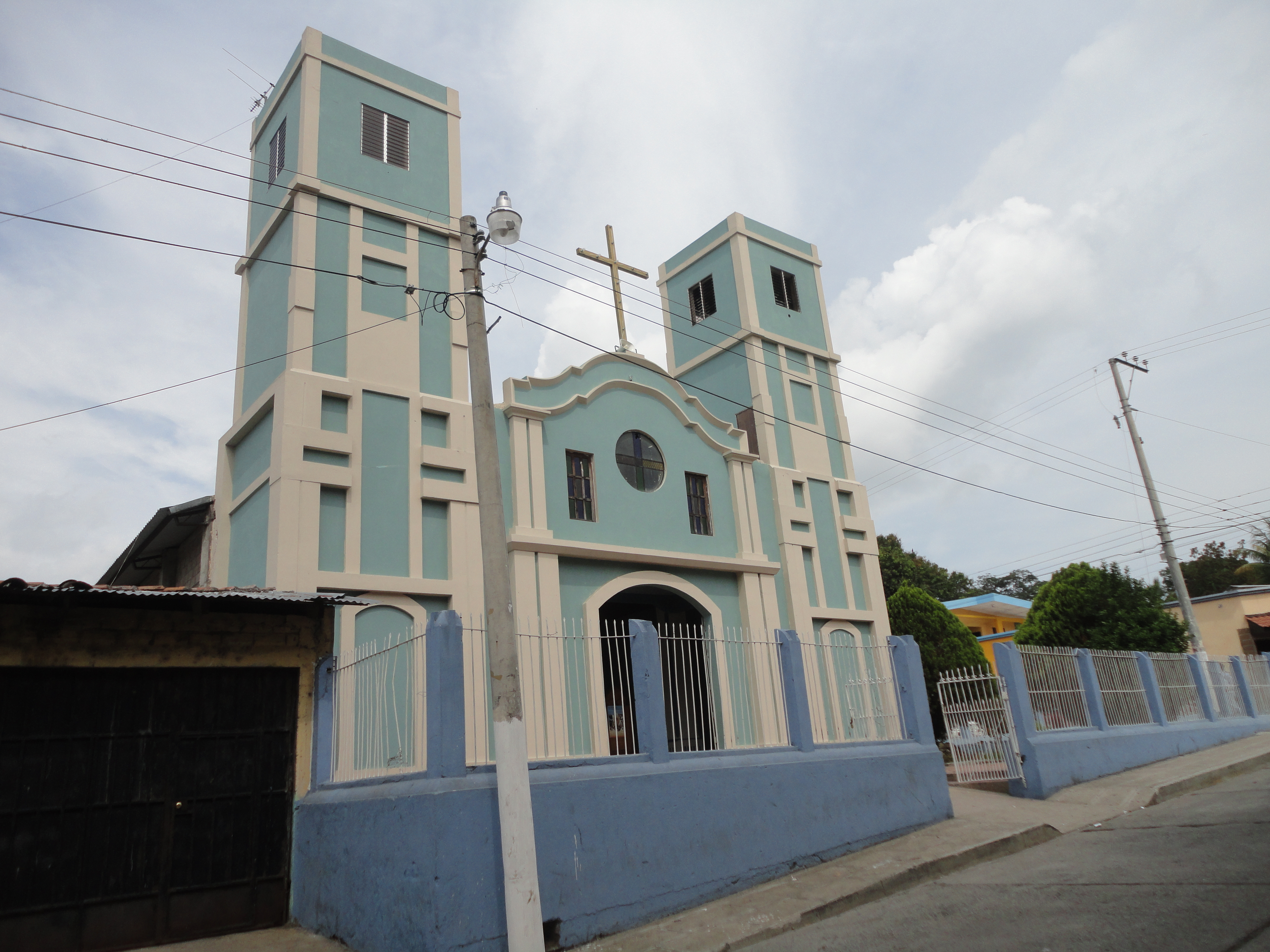

- Location in El Salvador
- Coordinates: 13°41′N 88°47′W
- Country: El Salvador
- Department: San Vicente Department

Area
  - Total: 30.17 sq mi (78.14 km^{2})
- Elevation: 1,955 ft (596 m)

Population (2007)
  - Total: 5,998

San Esteban Catarina is a municipality in the San Vicente department of El Salvador.

San Esteban Catarina is set on a hill (cerro) and it has kept the traditional sets of a typical village. Every year in San Esteban Catarina there is a hot air balloon festival.

== Sports ==
The local professional football club is named C.D. Real San Esteban and it currently plays in the Salvadoran Third Division.
