= Ilobasco =

- District
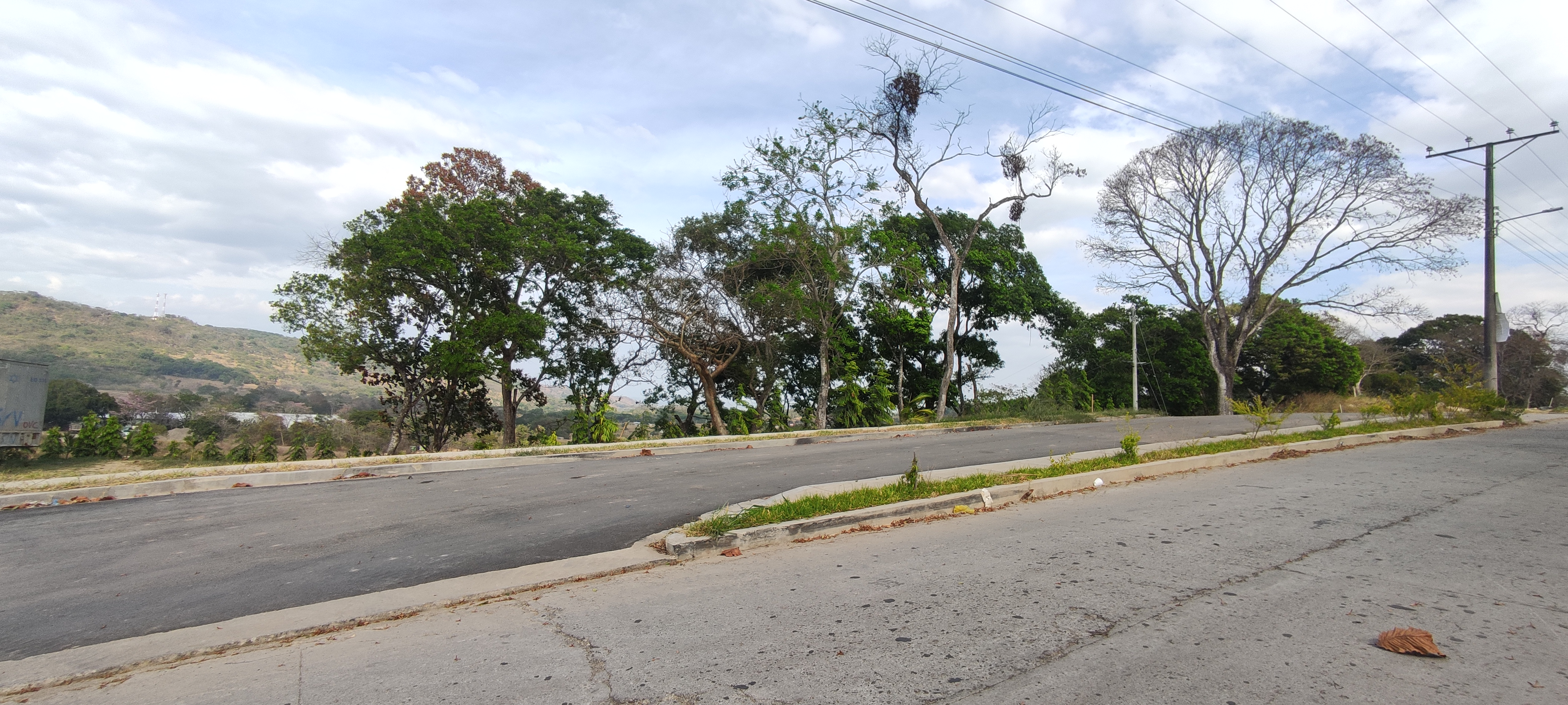

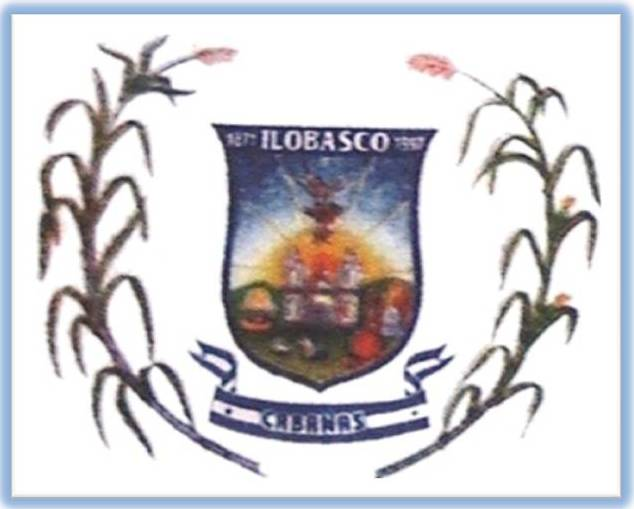
- Seal

- Location in El Salvador
- Coordinates: 13°51′N 88°51′W
- Country: El Salvador
- Department: Cabañas
- Municipality: Cabañas Oeste

Government
  - Type: Mayoralty
  - Mayor: Lorenzo Rivas

Area
  - District: 96.41 sq mi (249.69 km^{2})
- Elevation: 2,460 ft (750 m)

Population (2024)
  - District: 58,581
  - Rank: 24th in El Salvador
  - Density: 640/sq mi (246/km^{2})
  - Urban: 32,288
  - Rural: 26,293
- Time zone: UTC-6

Ilobasco is a district in the Cabañas Department of El Salvador. It is located 30 miles (48 kilometers) northeast of the capital, San Salvador.

== History ==
The Pipil people later conquered the territory at the end of the 15th century. It was organized as a town in 1600, with the name of San Miguel de Xilobasco or Ilobasco, when the first church was built in its center.

At the same time, the settlement of families of Hispanic origin in the town caused growth, becoming a parish around 1770, until January 18, 1871, when it was granted the city category after the Independence process.

Ilobasco has a valuable architectural heritage, which has endured over time, as well as its crafts, being one of the major local tourist attraction in El Salvador.

== Culture ==
Ilobasco is known locally and internationally for its clay (other materials also used) craftsmanship or pottery. The clay is extracted and prepared locally. The clay work includes the "miniatures", which are small representations of daily scenes as lived by Salvadorans, no bigger than 2 inches tall. One version of the miniatures are the "surprises", which are basically a scene covered with another piece of clay shaped and painted in the form of a fruit, an egg, a house or other things. The cover can be removed and then the scene can be seen.

== Toponymy ==
The actual origin and meaning of its name is unknown, most of the proposed names are nahuatl, such as: Xilohuako (Place of Dry Young-Corn), Xilotlaxko (Place of Young-Corn Tortilla), or Xilotazoko (Place of Young-Corn Clay). A document found in December 1859 affirms that the name is of Nawat origin and it means "Golden Thread," but origin of this word is unknown.

== Sports ==
The local football club is El Roble, formerly known as A.F.I. They currently play in the Salvadoran Second Division.
