= San Vicente, El Salvador =

San Vicente
- Municipality
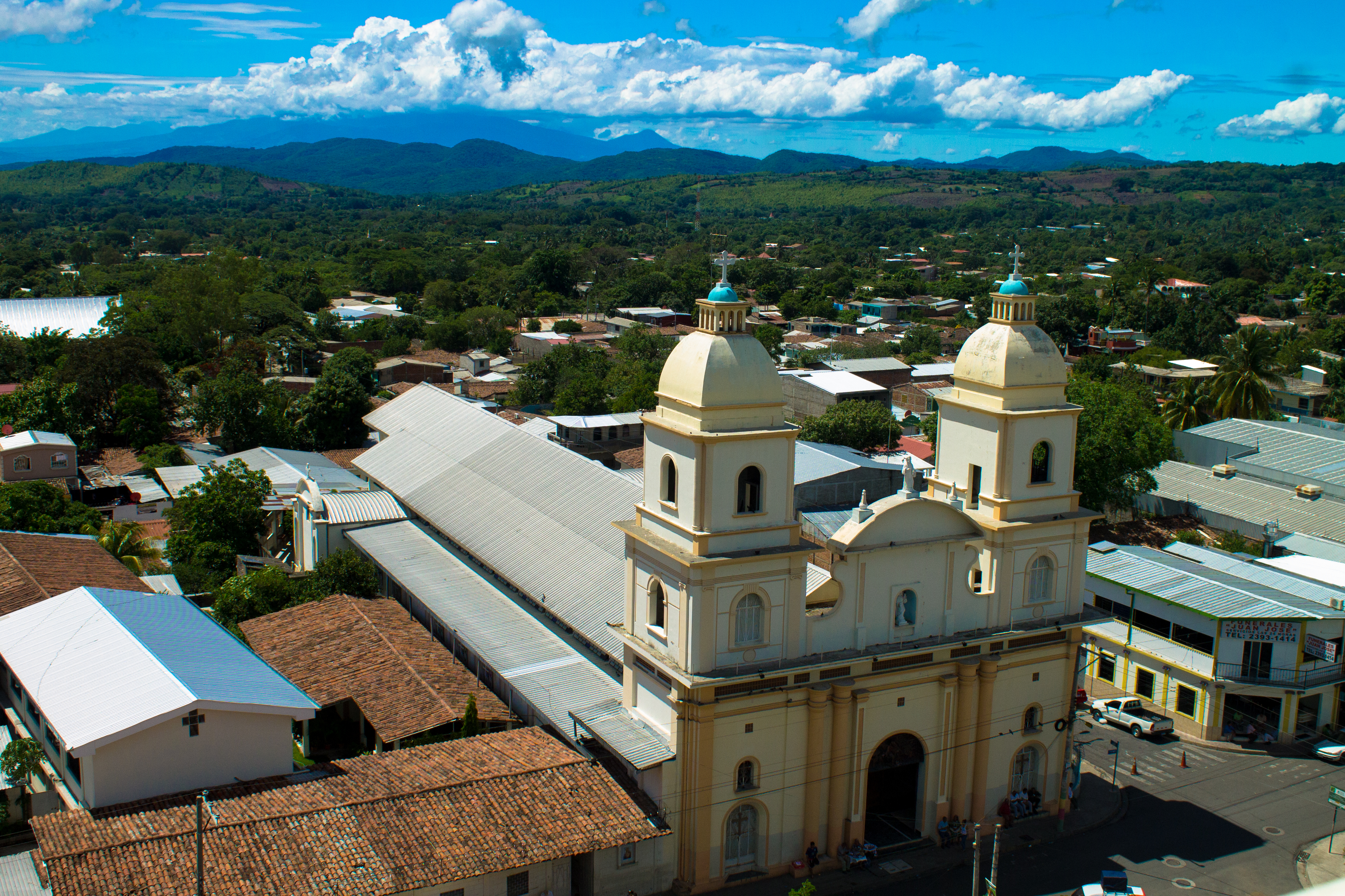
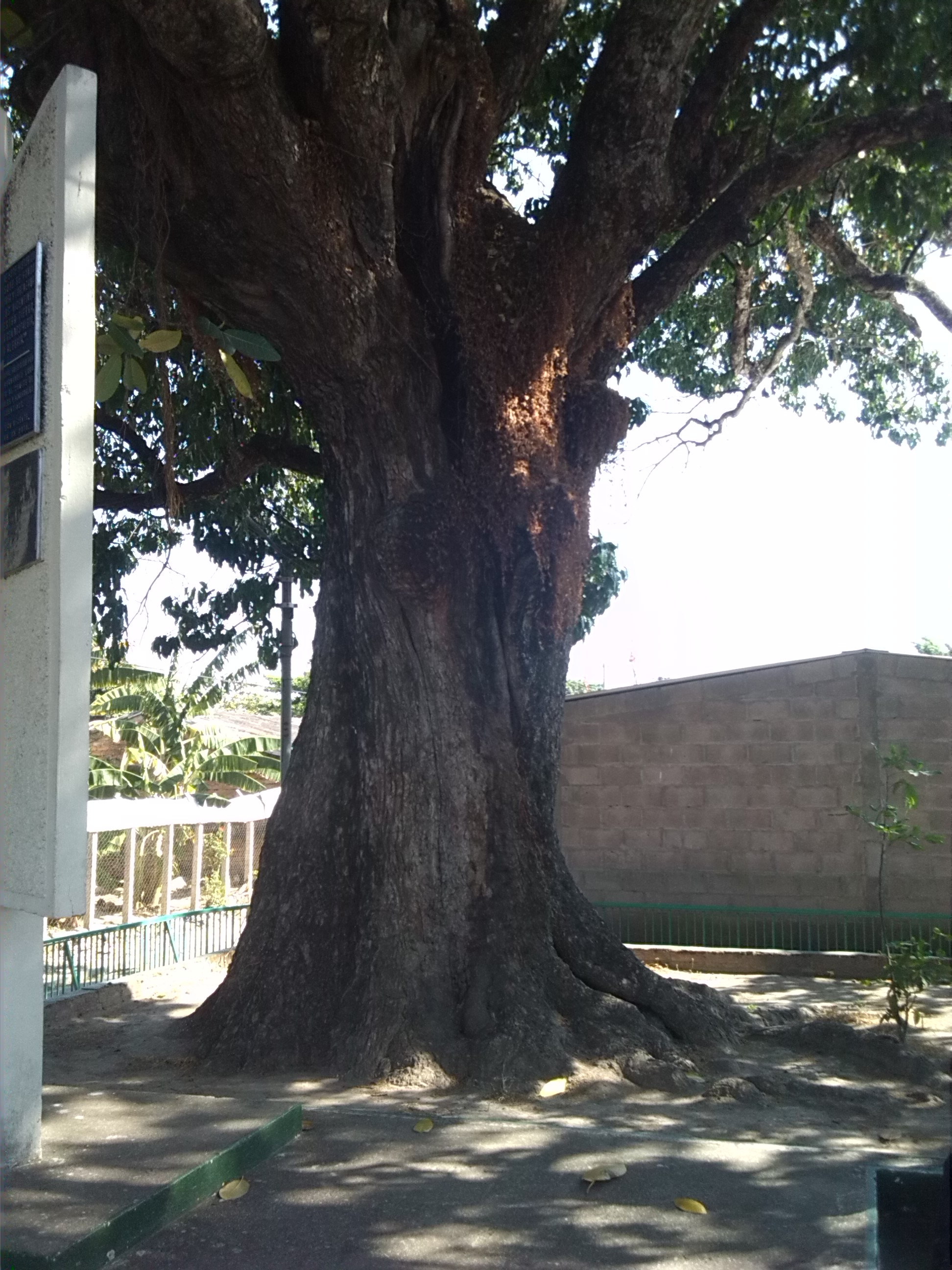
- Cathedral of Saint Vincent The Founding Tempisque tree Cathedral of San Vicente

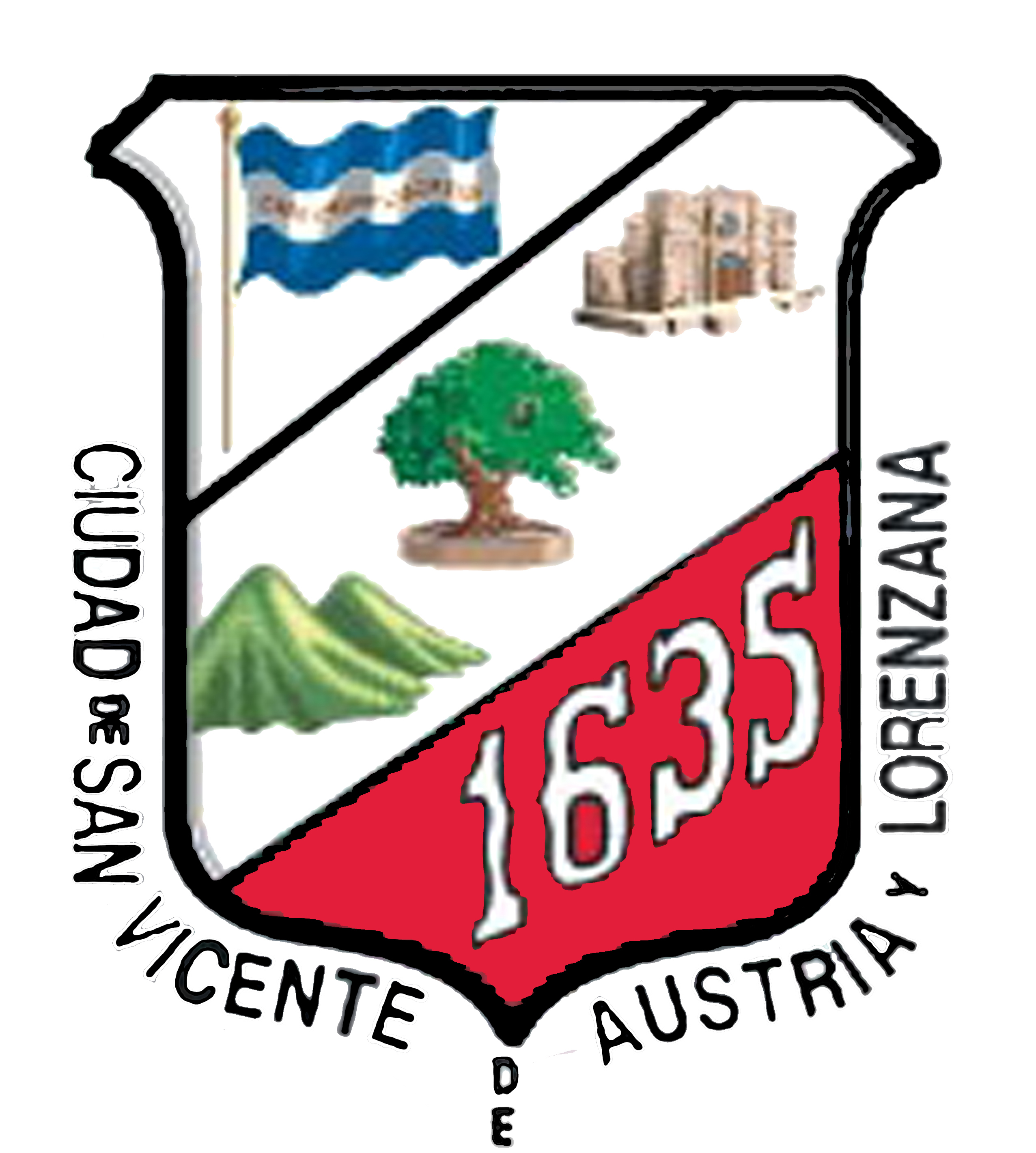
- Flag Seal

- Location in El Salvador
- Coordinates: 13°38′43″N 88°47′03″W
- Country: El Salvador
- Department: San Vicente Department
- Established: 1635

Area
  - Total: 267.25 km^{2} (103.19 sq mi)
- Elevation: 390 m (1,280 ft)

Population (2012)
  - Total: 53,213
  - Density: 199.11/km^{2} (515.70/sq mi)
- Website: Official website (in Spanish)

San Vicente (Spanish pronunciation: [sam biˈsente]) is a municipality in the San Vicente department of El Salvador. It was founded by 50 Spanish families in 1635 under the Tempisque tree, which is still standing today.

== Historic sites ==
One point of interest is the Tower of San Vicente, designed by French Architect Eugenio Basilio Crepiat (the Spanish version of his name), located at the center of the city in Cañas Park. It was damaged by an earthquake in 2001. Repairs have since been made, and the tower is once again the hub of many festivities. Another point of interest is water complex "Amapulapa" which is a water park that has multiple pools a water cascade and multiple restaurants and bars. The city has several local festivals, which take place at Cañas Park. Among these are the gastronomic festivals, which are usually held every month.

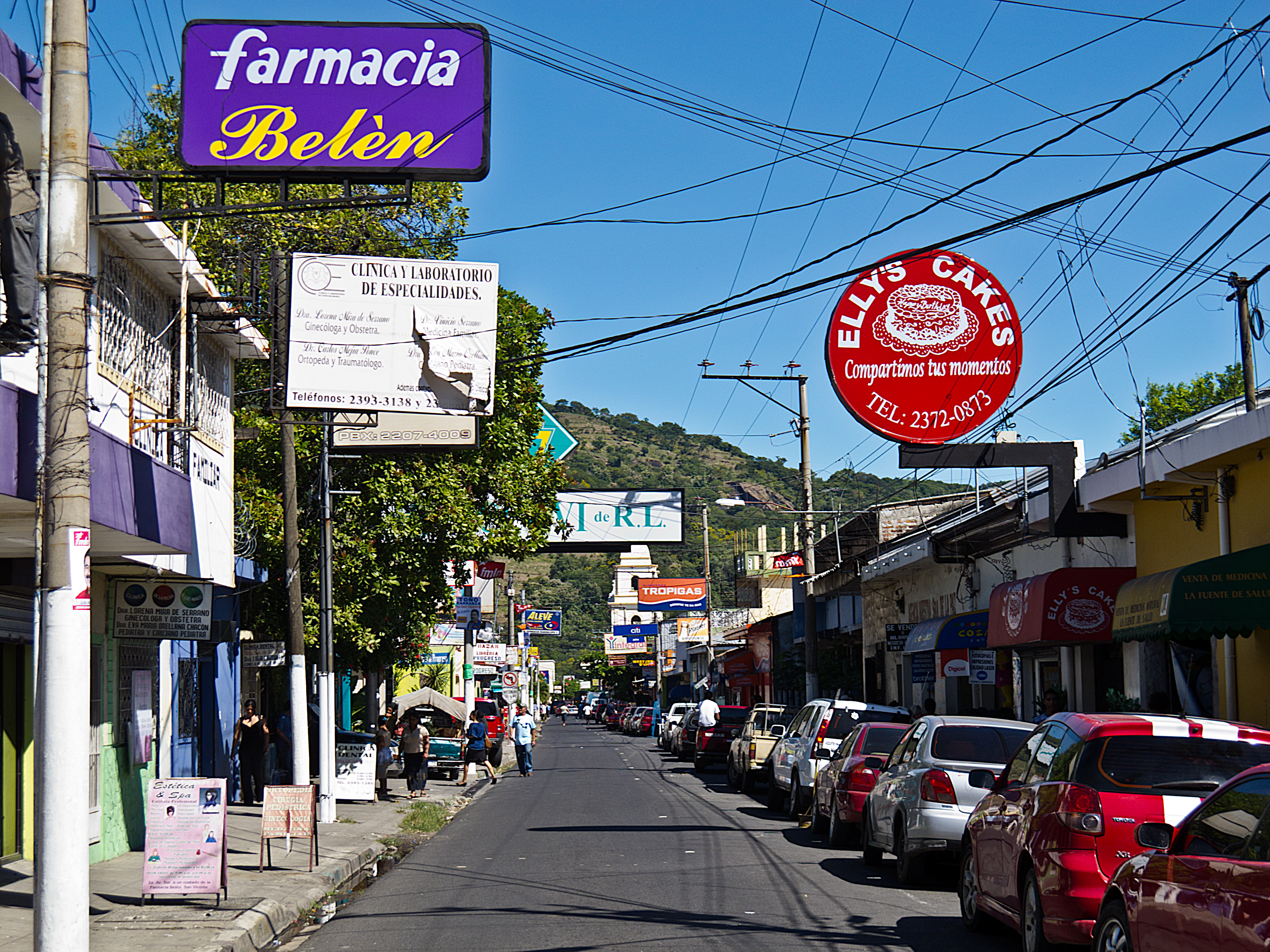
Street view of San Vicente (2a Avenida Sur)

== Religion ==
San Vicente is also the seat of the Roman Catholic Diocese of San Vicente.

== Geography ==
San Vicente is situated in a volcanic region abounding in hot springs and geysers.

El Salvador's second highest volcano, the San Vicente volcano (also known as "Chichontepec" or "Las Chiches"), is located next to the city.
