= San Vicente Department =

Department of El Salvador

San Vicente
- Department
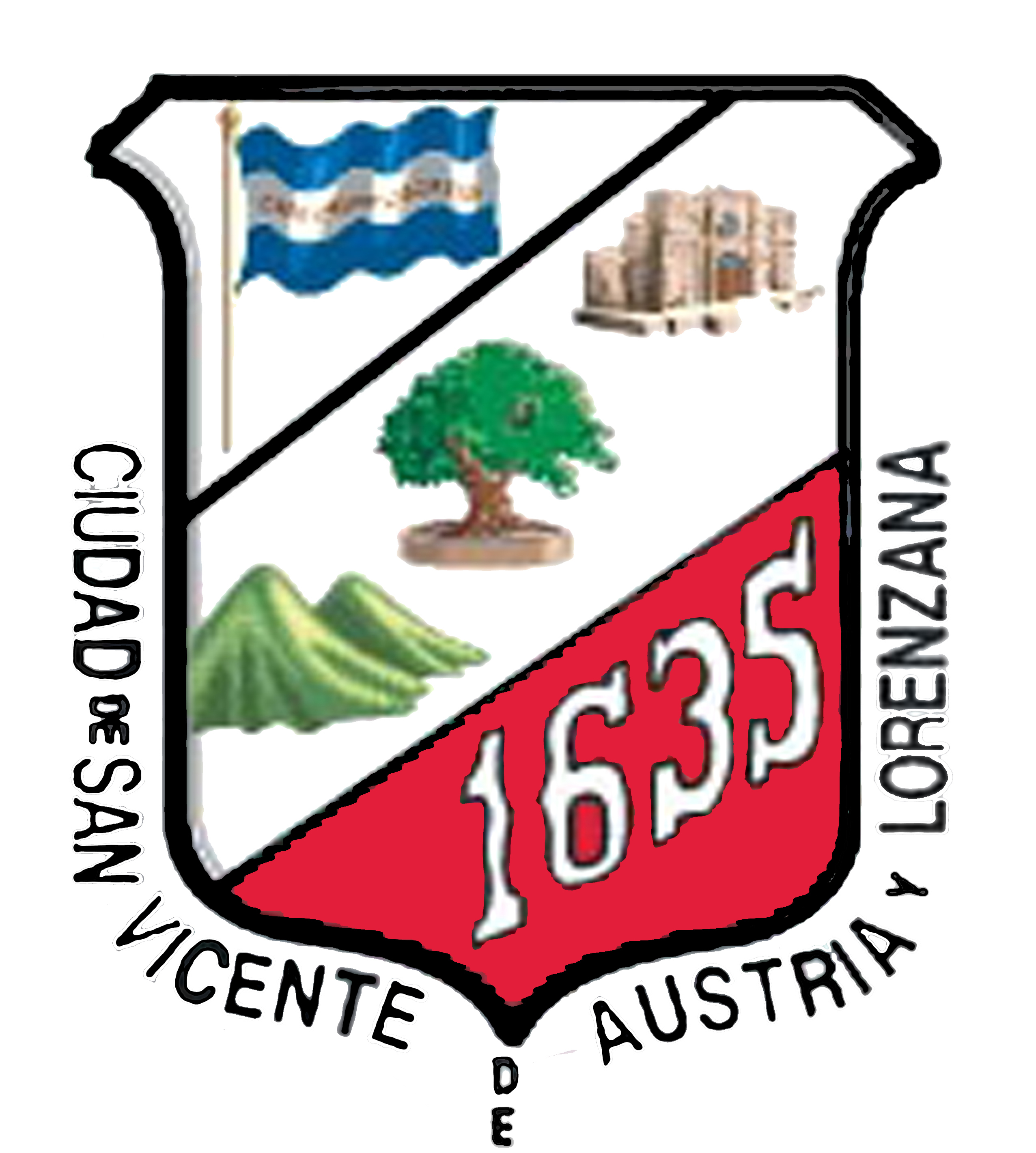
- Flag Coat of arms

- Location within El Salvador
- Coordinates: 13°31′34″N 88°45′07″W
- Country: El Salvador
- Created (given current status): 1824
- Seat: San Vicente

Area
  - Total: 1,184.0 km^{2} (457.1 sq mi)
  - Rank: Ranked 11th

Population
  - Total: 174,561
  - Rank: Ranked 13th
  - Density: 147.43/km^{2} (381.85/sq mi)
- Time zone: UTC−6 (CST)
- ISO 3166 code: SV-SV

San Vicente (Spanish pronunciation: [sam biˈsente]) is a department of El Salvador in the center of the country. The capital is San Vicente. On October 4, 1834, San Vicente City of Austria and Lorenzana (Ciudad de San Vicente de Austria y Lorenzana) was made the capital of State of El Salvador during the Federal Republic of Central America. In 1840, it was no longer the capital of the State of El Salvador, but it continues to be the capital of the department. The department was created on June 12, 1824. The San Vicente department is 1,184 km^{2} (457 sq mi) and has a population in excess of 174,500. The forest Bosque La Joya is found in San Vicente. The Terrorism Confinement Center (CECOT) is located in the San Vicente Department in Tecoluca.

== Municipalities ==
1. San Vicente Norte
2. San Vicente Sur

== Districts ==
1. Apastepeque
2. Guadalupe
3. San Cayetano Istepeque
4. San Esteban Catarina
5. San Ildefonso
6. San Lorenzo
7. San Sebastián
8. San Vicente
9. Santa Clara
10. Santo Domingo
11. Tecoluca
12. Tepetitán
13. Verapaz

== History ==
During the Salvadoran Civil War, the region was considered a stronghold for the rebel Farabundo Martí National Liberation Front. In August 1982, the Salvadoran Army began a campaign in the area, moving in with ground troops after several days of bombing. On August 21–22, the Atlácatl Battalion surprised a group of hundreds of refugees at El Calabozo beside the Amatitán river, opening fire at close range. More than two hundred are reported to have died, among them infants and elderly, leading the incident to be called El Calabozo massacre. The Terrorism Confinement Center (CECOT) maximum security prison was inaugurated there on 31 January 2023.

== Volcano of San Vicente ==
One of the most imposing volcanoes of the coastal chain is the Chinchontepec, or volcano of San Vicente, located in the confines of the department of the same name. Its almost perfect cone, as sugar pile, finishes off in two hill tops and this peculiarity gives origin to its nahuatl name "Hill of two tits".

The oriental summit was called "volcano of Zacatecoluca", is the highest one at 2,173 meters over sea level and it presents a well formed and conserved crater whose bottom at 1,990 meters has a swamp in the stormy season.

The western summit, smaller at 2,083 meters, exhibits an open crater to the east.

Dense vegetation covers both summits. To the northeast, at 820 meters in a ravine of 180 meters of longitude, there are fumaroles; fountains of clear and muddy water or small volcanoes of mud. The most important is to the south of the geological fissure. These groups of phenomenon of geological action are called "infiernillos". In them, the water is at temperatures of 60 °C to 98 °C and they contain great quantities of water vapor, sulfuric acid, sulfuric hydrogen, and carbonic acid.

The Valley of Jiboa expands to the northeast and north of the western summit. It is also called Valley of Millers.

Chichontepec Volcano has also in the midst of the valley, an important archaeological site called "Tehuacan." This was a place of adoration to the Aztec gods, and the found structures demonstrates the type of hierarchical organization their tribes had.

== Products ==
San Vicente is known for the variety of typical sweets made with coconut preserves, nance, and tamarindo. In San Esteban Catarina, sweets of panela and pilon sugar are manufactured. San Sebastian is known for its textile production.
