= 2023–24 Segunda División de Fútbol Salvadoreño =

Segunda División de Fútbol Salvadoreño
- Season: 2023-24
- Champions: Apertura 2023: Titan, Clausura 2024: Cacahuatique
- Promoted: Cacahuatique
- Relegated: Vendaval and Pipil
- Matches: 56
- Goals: 129 (2.3 per match)
- Top goalscorer: Apertura 2023: David Gomez (Tiburones) (17 goals); Clausura 2024: TBD (TBD) (00 goals)
- Biggest home win: Apertura 2023: TBD 8–0 TBD (20 October 2022); Clausura 2024: TBD 8–0 TBD (3 April 2022); Clausura 2023:
- Biggest away win: Apertura 2023: TBD 1-6 TBD (20 November 2022); Clausura 2024: TBD 2-6 TBD (1 May 2023)
- Highest scoring: Apertura 2023: TBD 7-3 TBD (26 September 2021); Clausura 2024: TBD 5-5 TBD (4 May 2023)
- Longest winning run: Apertura 2023: 5 matches Titan; Clausura 2024: TBD 8–0 TBD (3 April 2022)
- Longest unbeaten run: Apertura 2023: 9 matches Cacahuatique; Clausura 2024: 7 matches
- Longest winless run: Apertura 2023: 16 matches Vendaval; Clausura 2024: 16 matches Vendaval
- Longest losing run: Apertura 2023: 10 matches Vendaval; Clausura 2024: 16 matches Vendaval
- Highest attendance: Apertura 2023: 3,465; TBD 3–0 TBD (1 August 2021)
- Lowest attendance: Apertura 2023: 189; TBD vs TBD (19 August 2021)
- Total attendance: Apertura 2023: TBD
- Average attendance: Apertura 2023: TBD
- Stats are from the regular season only

The 2023–24 season (officially known as Liga de Plata and also as TBD) will be El Salvador's Segunda División de Fútbol Salvadoreño. The season will be split into two championships Apertura 2023 and Clausura 2024. The champions of the Apertura and Clausura play the direct promotion playoff every year. The winner of that series ascends to Primera División de Fútbol de El Salvador.

== Changes to the 2023–24 seasons ==
Teams promoted to 2023–24 Primera División de El Salvador

- Fuerte San Francisco
- Municipal Limeno (Purchased spot of Atletico Marte)

Teams relegated to Segunda División de Fútbol Salvadoreño - Apertura 2023

- Chalatenango (Later Failed to register to the Segunda Division)

Teams relegated to Tercera Division de Fútbol Salvadoreño - Apertura 2023

- A.D. Masahuat
- Gerardo Barrios

Teams promoted from Tercera Division de Fútbol Salvadoreño - Apertura 2023

- FC Los Laureles
- Santiagueno
- Cruzeiro

New Teams or teams that purchased a spot in the Segunda division

- Fuerte Aguilares
- INCA
- El Roble (Purchased spot of Municipal Limeno)
- Tiburones Sonsonate (Purchased spot of AD Destroyer)

Teams that failed to register for the Apertura 2023

- Chalatenango
- Nuevo Cuscatlan
- A.D. Inter

== Notable events ==
=== Municipal Limeno purchase of Atletico Marte spot in the Primera Division ===
On the 26th of June, 2023 Municipal Limeño acquired the spot of the historic team Atletico Marte in the Primera division. This ended 3 years of Atletico Marte being in the Primera division.

=== Several teams selling their spot in the Segunda division ===
On July 6, AD Destroyer announced due to lack of financial support the club would be selling their spot in the Segunda Division. On July 11, 2023, a group of business purchased the spot of AD Destroyer and the club relocated to Sonsonate, the club will be named Tiburones Sonsonate.

On July 12, AD Inter announced on the team social media platform that due to several sponsors pulling support, high team cost and lack of fans support, the club announced they would be selling their spot in the Segunda Division.

On July 13, 2023, The Clausura 2023 champion Titan announced on the team social media due to the high team expenses and cost to be accredited to FIFA standard. The team will be selling their spot in the Segundo division.

=== Clubs Failure to register for 2023 Apertura ===
On 28 July 2023, the Segunda División confirmed the administrative relegation of Chalatenango to Tercera Division due to their financial crisis, which meant all players contracts were voided.

=== Delayed start to the 2023 Apertura ===
on 17 August 2023, communication was sent by the Segunda division that due to several clubs failure meet the FESFUT requirements, the league will delay the start of the Segubnda division which was scheduled to start on the 19th/20 August 2023.

=== Topiltzin canceled remaining games at 2023 Apertura ===
On 10 November 2023 FESFUT announced due to lack of payments by Topiltzin all remaining games involving will be cancelled and possibility of automatically relegation to the tercera division.

=== Change of final location 2024 Clausura ===
On June 13, 2024 The Segunda Division announced they would be moving the grand final from Estadio Antonio Toledo Valle to the Estadio Cuscatlán, the game will be played 16 June 2024 and played between Cacahuatique and Tiburones de Sonsonate.

== Managerial changes ==
=== Before the start of the season ===
Team	Outgoing manager	Manner of departure	Date of vacancy	Replaced by	Date of appointment	Position in table
Once Lobos	(El Salvador) Nelson Ancheta	Mutual Agreement	June 2023	(El Salvador) Cesar Acevedo	June 2023	th (2023 Apertura)
Cacahuatique	(El Salvador) Carlos Romero	Mutual Agreement	June 30, 2023	(El Salvador) Nelson Ancheta	July 1, 2023	th (2023 Apertura)
Corinto	(El Salvador) Amilcar Alfonso Guzman	Mutual Agreement	June 30, 2023	(El Salvador) Jorge Abrego	July 3, 2023	th (2023 Apertura)
Fuerte Aguilares	(El Salvador) Rafael Mariona	Mutual Agreement	June 30, 2023	(El Salvador) Angel Orellana	July 3, 2023	Newly promoted (2023 Apertura)
Cruzeiro	(El Salvador) Ricardo Garcia	Mutual Agreement	July 4, 2023	(Uruguay) Ruben Alonso	July 4, 2023	Newly promoted (2023 Apertura)
El Roble	(El Salvador) Hiatus	Returning from hiatus	July 4, 2023	(El Salvador) Lazaro Gutierrez	July 4, 2023	Newly promoted (2023 Apertura)
Tiburones de Sonsonate	(El Salvador) Hiatus	Returning from hiatus	July 4, 2023	(El Salvador) Raul Orellana	July 4, 2023	New club (2023 Apertura)
Titan	(El Salvador) Juan Ramon Sanchez	Mutual consent	July 4, 2023	(El Salvador) Hector Omar Mejia	July 21, 2023	Champion (2023 Apertura)
Vendaval	(El Salvador) Francisco Hernandez	Mutual Agreement	June 30, 2023	(El Salvador) Fausto Omar Vasquez	July 23, 2023	th (2023 Apertura)
Santiagueño	(El Salvador)	End of Contract	July 1, 2023	(El Salvador) Victor Coreas	July 29, 2023	Newly promoted (2023 Apertura)
Cacahuatique	(El Salvador) Nelson Ancheta	Resigned to become Municipal Limeno	August, 2023	(El Salvador) Ivan Ruiz	August, 2023	th (2023 Apertura)
Vendaval	(El Salvador) Fausto Omar Vasquez	Mutual Agreement	August, 2023	(El Salvador) Ramon Sugar Aviles	August, 2023	th (2023 Apertura)

=== During the Apertura season ===
Team	Outgoing manager	Manner of departure	Date of vacancy	Replaced by	Date of appointment	Position in table
Tiburones de Sonsonate	(El Salvador) Raul Orellana	Resigned	August 31, 2023	(El Salvador) Juan Ramon Paredes	August 31, 2023	7th (2023 Apertura)
Vendaval	(El Salvador) Ramón “shugar” Avilés	Resigned	September 12, 2023	(El Salvador) Preza	September 2023	9th Centro Occidente (2023 Apertura)
Topiltzin	(El Salvador) Giovanni Trigueros	Sacked	September 2023	(Brazil) Eraldo Correia	October 2023	7th (2023 Apertura)
Atletico Balboa	(El Salvador) Misael Alfaro	Sacked	October 2023	(El Salvador) David Paz (Interim)	2023	3rd Centro oriente (2023 Apertura)
Corinto	(El Salvador) Jorge Abrego	Resigned	October 23, 2023	(El Salvador) Ulises Dubon	October 25, 2023	6th Centro Oriente (2023 Apertura)
El Roble	(El Salvador) Lazaro Gutierrez	Mutual Consent	October 23, 2023	(El Salvador) Omar David Sevilla	October 25, 2023	5th Centro Oriente (2023 Apertura)
Los Laureles	(El Salvador) Jose Flamenco	Mutual Consent	November 16, 2023	(El Salvador) Mario Elias Guevara	November 17, 2023	5th Centro Oriente (2023 Apertura)

=== Between the Apertura and Clausura season ===
Team	Outgoing manager	Manner of departure	Date of vacancy	Replaced by	Date of appointment	Position in table
TBD	(El Salvador) TBD	Sacked	2023	(El Salvador) TBD	2024	th (2023 Clausura)
Fuerte Aguilares	(El Salvador) Angel Orellana	Sacked	December 2023	(El Salvador) Alexis Guerra	January 2024	th (2023 Clausura)
San Pablo	(El Salvador) Jose Angel Reyes	Mutual Agreement	December 2023	(El Salvador) Donny Valle	January 2024	th (2023 Clausura)
Corinto	(El Salvador) Ulises Dubon	Interimship ended	December, 2023	(El Salvador) Rolando Pérez	January 12, 2024	th (2023 Clausura)
Tiburones	(El Salvador) Juan Ramón Paredes	Mutual Consent	January 12, 2024	(El Salvador) Ivan Ruiz	January 15, 2024	th (2023 Clausura)
Cacahuatique	(El Salvador) Ivan Ruiz	Resigned	January 15, 2024	(Uruguay) Pablo Quiñones	January 31, 2024	th (2023 Clausura)
El Roble	(El Salvador) Omar Sevilla	Resigned	December 2023	(Uruguay) Rubén da Silva	January 2024	th (2023 Clausura)

=== Clausura seasons ===
Team	Outgoing manager	Manner of departure	Date of vacancy	Replaced by	Date of appointment	Position in table
Pipil	(El Salvador) Oscar Amaya	Sacked	March 2024	(El Salvador) Marvin Rosales	March 2024	th (2023 Clausura)
Cruzeiro	(Uruguay) Ruben Alonso	Resigned	March 2024	(El Salvador) Guillermo Rivera	March 2024	th (2023 Clausura)
Tiburones	(El Salvador) Ivan Ruiz	Mutual Consent	April 2024	(El Salvador) Juan Carlos Palma	April 2024	th (2023 Clausura)

== Stadiums and locations ==
Team	City	Stadium	Capacity
Atletico Balboa	TBD, TBD	Estadio TBD	00,000
Cacahuatique	TBD, TBD	Estadio TBD	00,000
Corinto	TBD, TBD	Estadio TBD	00,000
Cruzeiro	TBD, TBD	Estadio TBD	00,000
El Roble	TBD, TBD	Estadio Titan, Texistepeque	00,000
Fuerte Aguilares	TBD, TBD	Estadio Mario Jovel, Aguilares	00,000
INCA	TBD, TBD	Estadio TBD	00,000
Los Laureles	TBD, TBD	Estadio TBD	00,000
Once Lobos	TBD, TBD	Estadio TBD	00,000
Pipil	TBD, TBD	Estadio TBD	00,000
Rácing Jr	TBD, TBD	Estadio TBD	00,000
San Pablo	TBD, TBD	Estadio Valle Mesa	00,000
Santiagueno	TBD, TBD	Estadio TBD	00,000
Tiburones de Sonsonate	TBD, TBD	Estadio TBD	00,000
Titan	TBD, TBD	Estadio TBD	00,000
Topiltzin	TBD, TBD	Estadio TBD	00,000
Vendaval Apopa	TBD, TBD	Estadio TBD	00,000

=== Personnel and kits ===
Team	Chairman	Head coach	Captain	Kit manufacturer	Shirt sponsor(s)
Atletico Balboa	TBD	(El Salvador) Misael Alfaro	(El Salvador) TBD	JM Borbados	ptiTEL, Eletcrolit, Funerio Ciudad Sion, Cable Vision La Union
Cacahuatique	TBD	(El Salvador) Ivan Ruiz	(El Salvador)	JM Borbados	Alcadia Cacahuatique, Accacciba
Corinto	TBD	(El Salvador) Jorge Abrego	(El Salvador) TBD	JM Borbados	VIP Fitness, Beautiful dental, Deli Market, Canal 64
Cruzeiro	TBD	(Uruguay) Ruben Alonso	(El Salvador) TBD	Katty Sports	InJIboa, Lemus, Acodjar, Electrolit, Maria Auxilladora
El Roble	TBD	(El Salvador) Lazaro Gutierrez	(El Salvador) Nelson Barrios	Katty Sports	El Roble
Fuerte Aguilares	TBD	(El Salvador) Angel Orellana	(El Salvador) Diego Rivera	Galaxia	Grupo Jiron, Electrolit, Marinita de la Cruz, Univision Canal 29
INCA	(El Salvador) Elmer Salazar	(El Salvador) TBD	(El Salvador) TBD	AVIVA	ASISA, Super Milagro, Codeza de RL
Los Laureles	TBD	(El Salvador) Marvin Zepeda	(El Salvador) Antonio Larios	Londom Sports	Cemento Regional, Eduardo Motu Dental, Cajade Credito
Once Lobos	TBD	(El Salvador) Cesar Acevedo	(El Salvador) TBD	TBD	Zona Franca Chalchupa
Pipil	TBD	(El Salvador) Omar Amaya	(El Salvador) TBD	Diseño Sport	Mascarello,
Rácing Jr	TBD	(El Salvador) Enzo Artiga	(El Salvador) A. Manuel	Nil	Racing USA, Electrolit, Taller Kaos, Laoshi Armenia
San Pablo	TBD	(El Salvador) Jose Angel Reyes	(El Salvador) Felix Sanchez	TBD	El Asade, Renta car Beliny, Aquavita
Santiagueno	TBD	(El Salvador) Victor Coreas	(El Salvador) TBD	JM Borbados	Hecasa, Supermercado, Deraiz, ISC Contractors,
Tiburones de Sonsonate	TBD	(El Salvador) Raul Orellana	(El Salvador) Marvin Molina	Sportfine	Electrolit, Civil
Titan	TBD	(El Salvador) Hector Omar Mejia	(El Salvador) Rosemberg Cueva	Nikys Sport	TBD
Topiltzin	TBD	(El Salvador) Giovanni Trigueros	(El Salvador) Allan Alfaro	TBD	Cablesat, Bahia Jiquilisco, Electrolit
Vendaval Apopa	TBD	(El Salvador) Ramon Aviles	(El Salvador) TBD	TBD	TBD

== Apertura 2023 ==
Only 17 teams registered for the 2023 Apertura. 3 clubs (C.D. Chalatenango, A.D. Inter Sivar and Atlético Nacional Cuscatleco) failed to register due lack of payments. AD Destroyer sold their spot and relocated to Sonsonate and were renamed Tiburones Sonsonate.

=== Current teams ===
Segunda Division El Salvador
Team	Location	Stadium	Capacity	Founded	Joined	Head coach	Foreign Players
Corinto F.C.	Corinto, Morazán	Estadio Municipal Corinto	TBD	1968	TBD	(El Salvador) Jorge Abrego	(Colombia) Jose Miguel Medrano (Colombia) Argenis Alba
Titan	Texistepeque, Santa Ana	Estadio Titan	TBD	1930	TBD	(El Salvador) Hector Omar Mejia	(Colombia) Devier Chaverra (Colombia) Yonier Hurtado
Atletico Balboa	La Union, La Unión Department	Estadio Marcelino Imners	TBD	TBD	TBD	(El Salvador) Misael Alfaro	(Colombia) TBD (Colombia) TBD
Cacahuatique	Ciudad Barrios, San Miguel	Cancha Ecologocal El Amaton	TBD	TBD	TBD	(El Salvador) Ivan Ruiz	(Colombia) TBD (Colombia) TBD
Cruzeiro	Candelaria Abajo, San Cayetano Istepeque, San Vicente department	Estadio Candelaria Abajo, San Vicente	TBD	TBD	TBD	(Uruguay) Ruben Alonso	(Colombia) TBD (Colombia) TBD
Pipil	Cacaopera, Morazán	Estadio Vicente Paul Fuentes	TBD	TBD	TBD	(El Salvador) Omar Amaya	(Colombia) Héctor Lemos (Colombia) Duban Andrade
El Roble	Ilobasco, Cabañas department	Estadio Mauricio Vides	TBD	TBD	2023	(El Salvador) Lazaro Gutierrez	(Colombia) Wilson Angulo (Colombia) Johnny Moran
Topiltzin	Jiquilisco, Usulután Department	Estadio Topilzín	TBD	TBD	TBD	(El Salvador) Giovanni Trigueros	(Colombia) Marcos Gallego (Colombia) TBD
Fuerte Aguilares	Aguilares, San Salvador Department	Complejo Mario Jovel	TBD	1959	2023	(El Salvador) Angel Orellana	(Colombia) TBD (Colombia) TBD
INCA	Entre Rios, La Libertad	Cancha San Isidro	TBD	1959	2023	(El Salvador) Héctor Alcides Salazar	(Colombia) TBD (Colombia) TBD
Once Lobos	Chalchuapa, Santa Ana	Estadio Club Deportivo Once Lobos	TBD	TBD	TBD	(El Salvador) Cesar Acevedo	(Colombia) TBD (Colombia) TBD
Rácing Jr	Armenia, Sonsonate	Estadio 21 de Noviembre	TBD	TBD	TBD	(El Salvador) Enzo Artiga	(Colombia) TBD (Colombia) TBD
San Pablo	San Pablo Tacachico, La Libertad	Estadio Valle Meza	TBD	TBD	TBD	(El Salvador) Jose Angel Reyes	(Colombia) Jorman Martinez (Colombia) TBD
Vendaval Apopa	Apopa, San Salvador Department	Estadio Joaquín Gutierrez	TBD	1927	TBD	(El Salvador) Ramon Aviles	(Colombia) TBD (Colombia) TBD
Los Laureles	TBD, Sonsonate	Cancha Tiburones Rojos, Acajutla	TBD	2016	2023	(El Salvador) Marvin Zepeda	(Colombia) TBD (Panama) Armando Polo
Tiburones de Sonsonate	Sonsonate, Sonsonate	Estadio Anna Mercedes Campos	TBD	2023	2023	(El Salvador) Raul Orellana	(Colombia) Eduardo Rodriguez (Colombia) Yessy Mena
Santiagueno	Santiago de María, Usulután Department	Estadio Leónidas Cárdenas	TBD	1917	2023	(El Salvador) Victor Coreas	(Colombia) Victor Hinestroza (Colombia) TBD

=== Regular seasons ===
==== Centro Oriente ====
Pos	Team	Pld	W	D	L	GF	GA	GD	Pts	Qualification or relegation
1	Titan	16	10	5	1	44	21	+23	35	Advance to Playoffs
2	Tiburones de Sonsonate	16	8	4	4	40	27	+13	28	Advance to Playoffs
3	San Pablo Tacachico	16	7	6	3	27	17	+10	27	Advance to Playoffs
4	INCA	16	8	3	5	36	27	+9	27	Advance to Playoffs
5	Fuerte Aguilares	16	6	5	5	24	22	+2	23	
6	Rácing Jr	16	6	4	6	23	18	+5	22	
7	Once Lobos	16	5	4	7	30	32	−2	19	
8	Los Laureles	16	3	6	7	23	29	−6	15	
9	Vendaval	16	0	1	15	10	64	−54	1	

Rules for classification: 1) points; 2) goal difference; 3) number of goals scored.

==== Centro Occidente ====
Pos	Team	Pld	W	D	L	GF	GA	GD	Pts	Qualification or relegation
1	Balboa	14	8	4	2	23	9	+14	28	Advance to Playoffs
2	Cacahuatique	14	8	4	2	22	11	+11	28	Advance to Playoffs
3	Cruzeiro	13	7	3	3	25	17	+8	24	Advance to Playoffs
4	Santiagueno	14	6	3	5	22	19	+3	21	Advance to Playoffs
5	Corinto	14	4	5	5	12	14	−2	17	
6	Pipil	14	3	4	7	15	23	−8	13	
7	El Roble	13	3	3	7	18	24	−6	12	
8	Topiltzin	12	1	2	9	8	28	−20	5	

Rules for classification: 1) points; 2) goal difference; 3) number of goals scored.

== Finals ==
=== Centro Oriente Conference ===
November 26, 2023
14:30

INCA	3-2	Titan
Mauricio Rodriguez 85' 93'; Vladimir Garcia pen.' (90)		Reinaldo Carpio; Jesus Ochoa

Cancha Entre Rios, Lourdes, TBD

December 3, 2023

Titan	0-1	INCA
Nil		TBD

Estadio, TBD, TBD

TBD won 2–1 on Aggregate

November 26, 2023

San Pablo Tacachico	1-1	Tiburones de Sonsonate
[Roberto Carlos Medina		Marcos Rodriguez 49'

Estadio Valle Meza, TBD, TBD

December 2, 2023

Tiburones de Sonsonate	0-0	San Pablo Tacachico
Nil		Nil

Estadio Ana Mercedes Campos, Sonsonate, Sonsonate

Tied 1–1 on aggregate. San Pablo Tacachico won 8–7 on penalties

=== Centro Occidente Conference ===
November 26, 2023
15:00 pm

Santiagueño	0-0	Atletico Balboa
Nil		Nil

Estadio Leónidas Cárdenas de Santiago de Maria, Santiago de María, Usulután

December 2, 2023

Atletico Balboa	2-2	Santiagueño
TBD; TBD		TBD; TBD

Estadio Marcelino Imners, La Union, La Union

Tied 2–2 on aggregate.Santiagueño won 4–3 on penalties.

November 26, 2023
10:00

Cruzeiro	1-1	Cacahuatique
Manuel Murillo		Rusvel Saravia

Estadio Jiboa, San Vicente, San Vicente department

December 3, 2023

Cacahuatique	3-1	Cruzeiro
Ilder Reyes 9'; Jonathan Hernández 46' 83'		Diego Ascensio Pen 91'

Cancha Ecologocal El Amaton, Ciudad Barrios, San Miguel

Cacahuatique won 4–2 on Aggregate

=== Centro Oriente Conference ===
December 10, 2023
15:00 pm

San Pablo Tacachico	1-4	Titan
Jorman Martinez		Bryan Ortega; Devier Chaverra; Rosember Cueva; Reinaldo Carpio

Estadio Mesa Valle, TBD

December 17, 2023
14:30

Titan	2-1	San Pablo Tacachico
Jesus Ochoa; Fabricio Moreno Own		Ariel Toledo

Estadio Titan Texistepeque, Texistepeque

Titan won 6–2 on Aggregate

=== Centro Occidente Conference ===
December 10, 2023
15:00 pm

Santiagueno	0-0	Cacahuatique
Nil		Nil

Estadio Leobidas Flores Cardenas, Santiago de Maria

December 17, 2023
14:00 pm

Cacahuatique	2-1	Santiagueno
Roberto Sol; Wilber Chicas		Ever Garcia 2'

Complejo Ecologico El Amaton, Ciudad Barrios, San Miguel

Cacahuatique won 2–1 on Aggregate

=== Grand final ===
December 23, 2023
14:00 pm

Cacahuatique	2-3	Titán
Roberto Carlos Sol 77'; Anderson Perla 82'		Reinaldo Carpio 88' 99'; Jesus Ochoa 114'

Estadio Antonio Toledo Valle, Zacatecoluca, La Paz

Apertura 2023 champions

4th title

=== Individual awards ===
Hombre GOL	Best Goalkeeper Award
(El Salvador) David Gomez; Tiburones de Sonsonate	(El Salvador) Kevin Aleman; Cacahuatique

== Clausura 2024 ==
Only 16 teams registered for the 2024 Clausura. Topiltzin failed to register due lack of payments and were automatically relegated.

=== Current teams ===
Segunda Division El Salvador
Team	Location	Stadium	Capacity	Founded	Joined	Head coach	Foreign Players
Atletico Balboa	La Union, La Unión Department	Estadio Marcelino Imbers	TBD	1950	2022	(El Salvador) David Paz	(Colombia) TBD (Colombia) TBD
Cacahuatique	Ciudad Barrios, San Miguel	Cancha C. Ecológico El Amaton	TBD	1968	2019	(Uruguay) Pablo Quinones	(Colombia) TBD (Colombia) TBD
Corinto	Corinto, Morazán	Estadio Municipal Corinto	TBD	1968	2021	(El Salvador) Rolando Perez	(Colombia) TBD (Colombia) TBD
Cruzeiro	Candelaria Abajo, San Cayetano Istepeque, San Vicente department	Estadio Candelaria Abajo, San Vicente	TBD	1986	2023	(Uruguay) Ruben Alonso	(Colombia) TBD (Colombia) TBD
El Roble	Ilobasco, Cabañas department	Estadio Mauricio Vides	TBD	1989	2023	(Uruguay) Ruben da Silva	(Colombia) TBD (Colombia) TBD
Fuerte Aguilares	Aguilares, San Salvador	Complejo Municipal de Aguilares	TBD	1959	2023	(El Salvador) Alexis Guerra	(Colombia) TBD (Colombia) TBD
INCA	Entre Rios, La Libertad	TBD	TBD	1959	2023	(El Salvador) Héctor Alcides Salazar	(Colombia) TBD (Colombia) TBD
Los Laureles	Acajutla, Sonsonate department	Cancha Tiburones Rojos, Acajutla	TBD	2016	2023	(El Salvador) Mario Elias Guevara	(Colombia) TBD (Colombia) TBD
Once Lobos	Chalchuapa, Santa Ana	Estadio Club Deportivo Once Lobos	TBD	1918	2021	(El Salvador) Cesar Acevedo	(Colombia) TBD (Colombia) TBD
Pipil	Cacaopera, Morazán	Estadio Vicente Paul Fuentes	TBD	1979	2022	(El Salvador) Óscar Eduardo Amaya	(Colombia) TBD (Colombia) TBD
Rácing Jr	Armenia, Sonsonate	Estadio 21 de Noviembre	TBD	1951	2021	(El Salvador) Enzo Artiga	(Colombia) TBD (Colombia) TBD
San Pablo	San Pablo Tacachico, La Libertad	Cancha Valle Mezas	TBD	2000	2016	(El Salvador) Donny Valle	(Colombia) TBD (Colombia) TBD
Santiagueño	Santiago de María, Usulután Department	Estadio Municipal de Santiago de María	TBD	1917	2023	(El Salvador) Victor Coreas	(Colombia) TBD (Colombia) TBD
Tiburones de Sonsonate	Sonsonate, Sonsonate Department	Estadio Anna Mercedes Campos	TBD	2023	2023	(El Salvador) Ivan Ruiz	(Colombia) TBD (Colombia) TBD
Titán	Texistepeque, Santa Ana Department	Estadio Titan	TBD	1930	2019	(El Salvador) Omar Mejia	(Colombia) TBD (Colombia) TBD
Vendaval	Apopa, San Salvador	Estadio Joaquín Gutierrez	TBD	1927	2012	(El Salvador) TBD	(Colombia) TBD (Colombia) TBD

=== Regular seasons ===
==== Centro Oriente ====
Pos	Team	Pld	W	D	L	GF	GA	GD	Pts	Qualification or relegation
1	Titan	16	11	2	3	47	17	+30	35	Advance to Playoffs
2	Los Laureles	16	10	2	4	30	17	+13	32	Advance to Playoffs
3	Tiburones de Sonsonate	16	8	3	5	31	19	+12	27	Advance to Playoffs
4	Rácing Jr	16	6	9	1	24	16	+8	27	Advance to Playoffs
5	San Pablo Tacachico	16	7	5	4	34	23	+11	26	
6	Fuerte Aguilares	16	5	6	5	25	20	+5	21	
7	Once Lobos	16	4	6	6	28	33	−5	18	
8	INCA	16	4	1	11	23	41	−18	13	
9	Vendaval	16	0	0	16	3	59	−56	0	

Rules for classification: 1) points; 2) goal difference; 3) number of goals scored.

==== Centro Occidente ====
Pos	Team	Pld	W	D	L	GF	GA	GD	Pts	Qualification or relegation
1	El Roble	12	7	4	1	17	10	+7	25	Advance to Playoffs
2	Corinto	12	6	1	5	24	23	+1	19	Advance to Playoffs
3	Cacahuatique	12	4	4	4	16	17	−1	16	Advance to Playoffs
4	Cruzeiro	12	3	5	4	20	21	−1	14	Advance to Playoffs
5	Santiagueno	12	3	5	4	10	13	−3	14	
6	Balboa	12	3	3	6	20	21	−1	12	
7	Pipil	12	2	6	4	14	16	−2	12	

Rules for classification: 1) points; 2) goal difference; 3) number of goals scored.

== Finals ==
=== Centro Oriente Conference ===
May 18, 2024

Cacahuatique	4-1	Corinto
Meme Gonzalez pen.' Edenilson Villalobos; Wilber Chicas; Cristian Portillo		Heriberto Velasquez

Cancha C. Ecológico El Amaton, Ciudad Barrios, San Miguel

May 25, 2024

Corinto	0-2	Cacahuatique
Nil		Wilber Chicas; Oscar Soriano

Estadio Gilberto Sorto, Corinto, Morazan

Cacahuatique won 6–1 on Aggregate.

May 19, 2024
15:00

Cruzeiro	4-3	El Roble
Cesar Rodriguez 3'; Diego Ascensio pen.' (18) 66'; Ricardo Guevara 49'		Camilo Delgado 47'; Diego Sanchez; Carlos Martinez

Estadio Jiboa, San Vicente, San Vicente department

May 25, 2023
15:00 pm

El Roble	1-0	Cruzeiro
Camilo Delgado 35'		Nil

Estadio Mauricio Vides, Ilobasco, TBD

4-4 on Aggregate. El Roble won 8–7 on Penalty shootout

=== Centro Occidente Conference ===
May 19, 2024
15:00

Tiburones Sonsonate	1-0	Los Laureles
Diego Martinez Urrutia 42'		Nil

Estadio Anna Mercedes Campos, Sonsonate, Sonsonate Department

May 26, 2024

Los Laureles	1-2	Tiburones Sonsonate
Henry Cortez		Diego Biguer; Levin Rojas

Cancha Tiburones Rojos, Acajutla, Sonsonate Department

Tiburones Sonsonate won 3–1 on Aggregate

May 19, 2024

Rácing Jr	0-1	Titan
Nil		Bryan Ortega

Estadio 21 de Noviembre, Armenia, Sonsonate Department

May 26, 2024

Titan	1-1	Rácing Jr
Rosemburg Cueva		Rodolfo Huezo

Estadio, Texistepeque, Santa Ana

Titan won 2–1 on Aggregate

=== Centro Oriente Conference ===
June 2, 2024

Cacahuatique	1-0	El Roble
IIder Reyes		‘’Nil’’

Estadio Centro Ecological El Amaton, TBD

June 8, 2024

El Roble	0-2	Cacahuatique
‘’Nil’’	[]	Anderson Portillo

Estadio Mauricio Vides, TBD

Cacahuatique won 3–0 on Aggregate

=== Centro Occidente Conference ===
June 1, 2024

Tiburones Sonsonate	1-0	Titan
Levin Rojas 91'		Nil

Estadio Anna Mercedes Campos, Sonsonate

June 10, 2024

Titan	1-0	Tiburones Sonsonate
Bryan Ortega	[]	Nil

TBD, TBD

1-1 on Aggregate. Tiburones Sonsonate won 4–2 on penalties

=== Grand final ===
June 26, 2024

Tiburones de Sonsonate	1-2	Cacahuatique
Eder Polanco 57'		Aldair Reyes 55' 74'

Estadio Cuscatlán, San Salvador, San Salvador Department

Clausura 2024 champions

1st title

=== Individual awards ===
Hombre GOL	Best Goalkeeper Award
(El Salvador) Luis Merino; Los Laureles	(El Salvador) Francisco Melendez; Rácing Jr
