= Pablo Quiñones =

Uruguayan football player

Personal information
- Full name: Pablo Enrique Quiñonez
- Date of birth: 21 December 1975 (age 50)
- Place of birth: Montevideo, Uruguay
- Position: Striker

Team information
- Current team: Cacahuatique (Head Coach)

Senior career*
Years	Team	Apps	(Gls)
1996–1998	Peñarol	8	(0)
1999–2000	Rampla Juniors		
2000-2001	FAS		
2002-2004	Once Lobos		
2005-2007	Atletico Balboa		
2008-2010	Rampla Juniors		

Managerial career
- 2012: FAS Reserves
- 2015-2016: Atlético Comalapa
- 2017-2018: San Pablo
- 2018: Vendaval
- 2019: Audaz
- 2019: Once Deportivo
- 2021: Jocoro
- 2021-2023: Fuerte San Francisco
- 2024: Cacahuatique
- 2024-2025: Dragon
- 2025-: Cacahuatique
- * Club domestic league appearances and goals

Pablo Enrique Quiñonez (born 21 December 1975) is a former Uruguayan football player, who currently coaches Cacahuatique in the Primera División de Fútbol de El Salvador.

== Career ==
Born in Montevideo, Quiñonez began playing professional football in the domestic league with powerhouse team Peñarol and Rampla Juniors. The forward spent most of his career playing abroad, moving to El Salvador for seven seasons in 2000 (playing for FAS,Once Lobos and Atletico Balboa ), before finishing his career with Rampla Juniors.

== Honours ==
=== Club honours ===
==== As a coach ====
- FAS Reserves
  - La Primera (1): Apertura 2012
- Atlético Comalapa
  - Segunda División Runnersup (1): 2016 Clausura
- Fuerte San Francisco
  - Segunda División Champion (1): 2022 Apertura
  - Play-off winners: 2022–23
- Cacahuatique
  - Segunda División Champion (1): 2024 Clausura
  - Play-off winners: 2023-24
