= Corinto F.C. =

Salvadoran professional football club

Corinto FC
- Full name: Corinto Futbol Clube
- Founded: 1968
- Ground: Estadio Municipal Corinto
- Chairman: (El Salvador) Lic. Davi Armando Villatoro
- Manager: (El Salvador) Mauricio Da Silva
- League: Hiatus
- Hiatus: Grupo
Home colours	Away colours

Corinto Futbol Clube are a Salvadoran professional football club based in Corinto, Morazán, El Salvador. The club currently plays in the Second Division of El Salvador.

== History ==
In January 2021, Corinto won the Tercera Division Apertura 2020 Final against Cangrejera FC to gain promotion to the segunda division.

On July 2024, Due to the financial strain for participating in the Segunda Division, the club decided to withdraw from the competition and the club is currently on hiatus.

== Honours ==
=== League ===
- Tercera Division and predecessors
- Champions: (1) : Apertura 2020
- La Asociación Departamental de Fútbol Aficionado' and predecessors (4th tier)
  - Champions (1): 2019

== Sponsors ==
- TBD

== Current squad ==
As of: August 2023 Note: Flags indicate national team as defined under FIFA eligibility rules; some limited exceptions apply. Players may hold more than one non-FIFA nationality.

No.	Pos.	Nation	Player
1	GK	SLV	Deris Escobar
2	DF	COL	Argenis Alba
3	DF	SLV	Norvin Alfaro
4	DF	SLV	Jonathan Alas
5	DF	SLV	Heriberto Velazquez
6	MF	SLV	Salvador Alfaro
7	FW	SLV	Pedro Escobar
8	MF	COL	Jose Medrano
9	FW	SLV	Salvador Vazquez
10	FW	SLV	Jose Luis Canales
12	MF	SLV	Cesar Amaya
15	DF	SLV	Juan Benitez
16	DF	SLV	Edwin Ortiz

No.	Pos.	Nation	Player
17	FW	SLV	Daniel Torres
20	MF	SLV	Daniel Cardona
21	FW	SLV	Adoni Escobar
22	GK	SLV	Adonay Hernandez
23	DF	SLV	Stamley Torres
29	FW	SLV	Martin Escobar
31	MF	SLV	Julio Villatoro
32	MF	SLV	Manrrique Escobar
33	DF	SLV	Felix Mendez
34	MF	SLV	Jefferson Marquez
35	MF	SLV	Erick Ramirez
38	DF	SLV	Cristian Alfaro
95	GK	SLV	Pablo Hernandez

=== Players with dual citizenship ===
- (El Salvador) (United States) TBD

=== In ===
Note: Flags indicate national team as defined under FIFA eligibility rules; some limited exceptions apply. Players may hold more than one non-FIFA nationality.

No.	Pos.	Nation	Player
—		SLV	Roberto Carlos (From Fuerte San Francisco)
—		SLV	Carlos Benitez (From Atletico San Simon)
—		SLV	TBD (From Free agent)
—		SLV	TBD (From Free agent)

No.	Pos.	Nation	Player
—		SLV	TBD (From Free agent)
—		SLV	TBD (From Free agent)
—		SLV	TBD (From Free agent)

=== Out ===
Note: Flags indicate national team as defined under FIFA eligibility rules; some limited exceptions apply. Players may hold more than one non-FIFA nationality.

No.	Pos.	Nation	Player
—		SLV	Juan Benitez (To Platense)
—		SLV	Cesar Amaya (To TBD)
—		SLV	Stamley Lopez (To TBD)
—		SLV	Adonay Hernadez (To TBD)

No.	Pos.	Nation	Player
—		SLV	Jayder Membreno (To TBD)
—		SLV	TBD (To TBD)
—		SLV	TBD (To TBD)

== Coaching staff ==
As of January 2024

Position	Staff
Manager	(El Salvador) Mauricio Da Silva
Assistant Manager	(El Salvador) Jose Rolando Perez
Physical coach	(El Salvador) Marvin Rosales
Goalkeeper Coach	(El Salvador) Ulises Alexander Dubon
Kineslogic	(El Salvador) TBD
Utility Equipment	(El Salvador) Adrian Molina
Football director	(El Salvador) TBD
Team Doctor	(El Salvador) TBD

== List of coaches ==
- (El Salvador) Amilcar Alfonso Guzman (September 2020)
- (El Salvador) Jose Rolando Perez (TBD 2021- May 2022)
- (El Salvador) Victor Coreas (June 2022-March 2023)
- (El Salvador) Amilcar Alfonso Guzman (March 2023-June 2023)
- (El Salvador) Jorge Abrego (July 2023- October 2023)
- (El Salvador) Ulises Alexander Dubon (October 2023 - December 2023)
- (El Salvador) Jose Rolando Perez (January 2024 - July 2024)
- (El Salvador) Hiatus' (July 2024 - Present)
