= Holy Spirit Grotto =

Corinto Cave
- Grotto
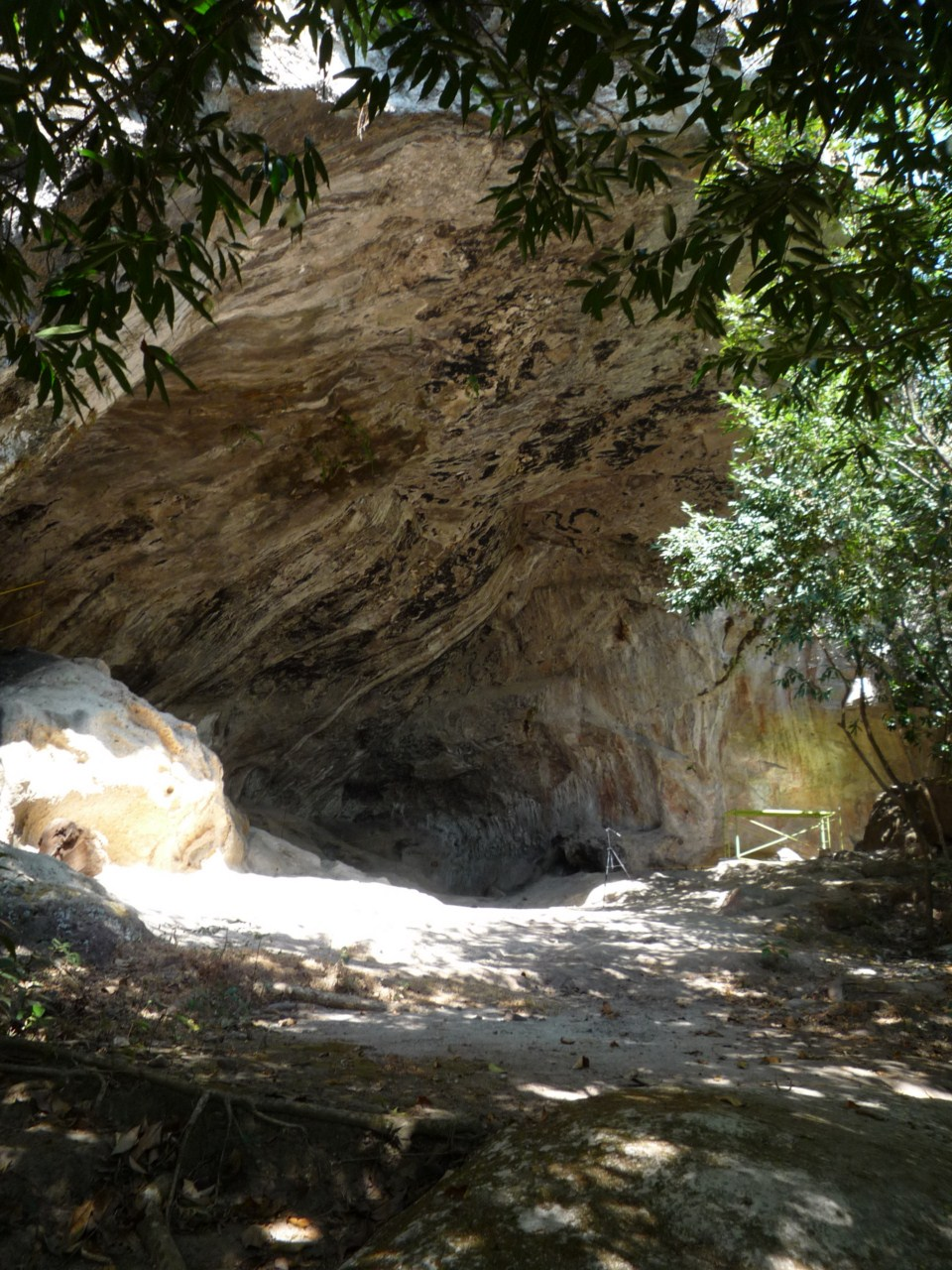
- Entrance into Corinto Cave Grotto

- Location in El Salvador
- Coordinates: 13°49′N 87°58′W
- Country: El Salvador
- Department: Morazán Department
- Elevation: 2,753 ft (839 m)

The Holy Spirit Grotto (La Gruta del Espíritu Santo in Spanish), also known as Corinto Cave, in Corinto, Morazán, El Salvador, is a registered national monument of petroglyphs. The cave is largely associated with the Xibalba legend. The archaeologist Wolfgang Haberland performed studies in the late 1970s indicating the art belongs to the pre-Classic stage of Mesoamerican civilization. The cave likely got its name due to the Mesoamerican association of caves with the underworld, meaning that they are "considered an entrance to the underground world governed by spirits and deities of death, disease, water, and fertility." The cave is an important cultural and religious site for the Lenca nation, forming part of their traditions and legends of the place where ancestors of Balam Colop parted (which is mentioned in the Popol vuh), according to their legends and traditions, is father of all Lenca people, given the association of caves with the underworld by Mesoamericans, the name of 'Holy Spirit Cave' is ironic and perhaps an attempt by early Spanish to "exorcise" the cave in El Salvador. The "holy" nature of this cave is further confirmed by a man named Don Argelio Alvarez, who happens to be one of its guardians. Roughly translated, he claims that the cave contains "something magical and inexplicable that inspires tranquility and peace." Many people from various religious groups also continue to visit the site and carry out ceremonies, such as what Don Argelio believed to have taken place in the cave many centuries ago. However, it is entirely possible that the cave was instead used for other means. A German scientist found some handcrafted arrows and knives made of obsidian within the cave, leading him to believe that it may have actually been a shelter for hunters instead.

The cave itself is located in a heavily forested volcanic landscape two kilometers north of Corinto, and is approximately 60 meters wide, 30 meters in height, and 20 meters deep, with multiple chambers. There are around 200 pictographs within the cave, each of varying colors, including red, ochre, black, green, yellow, and white. The size of each painting varies greatly. Some of the human figures can be up to 100 cm in height, although most are only around 30 cm. General symbols ranged from 4 to 50 cm in height.

Due to its location in an area of archaeological and anthropological interest, there is a great desire to develop it as a cultural center. Two large holes can be seen in an overhanging cliff, which could possibly have been used for astrological purposes. There are also standing stones with cupules, as well as what could possibly be the remnants of an extinct lake or river system. An ancient Spanish road also traverses the outcrop, "leaving deep cartwheel parallel tracks, indicating travel and trade with Honduras to the north." The cave is 20 meters by 60 meters in size, with several different chambers, and 30 meters in height. This would be sufficient space to support the dwelling of 200 people at a ratio of about 60 square feet per person.
