= C.D. Cacahuatique =

Association football club in El Salvador

Cacahuatique
- Full name: Club Deportivo Cacahuatique
- Nicknames: Los Cafeteros (The Coffee Makers); Cacahua
- Founded: 1968; 58 years ago, as Club Deportivo Cacahuatique
- Ground: Cancha C. Ecológico El Amaton
- Capacity: 5,000
- Chairman: (El Salvador) Lic.Juan Amaya
- Manager: (Argentina) Ángel “Nino” Piazzi
- League: (El Salvador) Primera División
- 2026 Clausura: Overall: 8th Playoffs: Semi-finalist
Home colours	Away colours	Third colours

Club Deportivo Cacahuatique is a Salvadoran professional football club based in Ciudad Barrios, San Miguel, El Salvador tournament champion apertura 2018.

The club currently plays in the Primera División.

The club was founded in 1968.

== History ==
Cacahuatique after 2 previous attempts to win the Segunda División Salvadorean title in Apertura 2021 and Apertura 2023, the club was able to win their first Segunda División Salvadorean title defeating Tiburones de Sonsonate on 2024.

Cacahuatique for the first time in their history were promoted to the Primera División on July 1, 2024, after defeating Titan in a playoff match by a score of 4-3 in penalties, after the team were tied 1-1 after 120 minutes.

== Honours ==
=== Domestic honours ===
- Segunda División Salvadorean and predecessors
  - Champions (1) : 2024 Clausura
  - Play-off winners: 2023-24
  - Runners-up (2) : Apertura 2021, Apertura 2023
- Tercera División Salvadorean and predecessors
  - Champions:(1) : Apertura 2018
- Liga ADFAS and predecessors
  - Champions:(1) : TBD

== Sponsorship ==
Companies that Cacahuatique currently has sponsorship deals with for 2026–2027 includes:

- (El Salvador) JymBordados Sublimación – Official kit suppliers
- (El Salvador) Gasolinera Jaguar Power – Official sponsors
- (El Salvador) Alcaldía de San Miguel Norte – Official sponsors
- (Mexico) Electrolit – Official sponsors
- (El Salvador) BRAS S.A. de C.V. – Official sponsors
- (El Salvador) Nativos de Ciudad Barrios – Official sponsors
- (El Salvador) Rico Pollo – Official sponsors
- (El Salvador) Inverssat S.A De C.V – Official sponsors
- (El Salvador) Canal 4 – Official sponsors
- (El Salvador) ACACCIBA de R.L. – Official sponsors
- (El Salvador) Centro Lab Medic – Official sponsors
- (El Salvador) CIMACOOP DE R.L. – Official sponsors
- (El Salvador) Agua Las Perlitas – Official sponsors
- (El Salvador) SIING Soluciones Integrales de Inceneria – Official sponsors

== Club records ==
- First victory in the Primera Division for Cacahuatique: 3-1 Firpo, August 3, 2024
- First goalscorer in the Primera Division for Cacahuatique: Rene Gomez v Alianza 2 August 2024
- 100th goal in the Primera Division for Cacahuatique: Honduran TBD v TBD Day Month, Year
- Largest Home victory, Primera División: 2-0 v Fuerte San Francisco August 25, 2024
- Largest Away victory, Primera División: 3-1 v Firpo, August 3, 2024
- Largest Home loss, Primera División: 1–3 v Alianza August 2, 2024
- Largest Away loss, Primera División: 1-3 v Aguila 4 November 2024
- Highest home attendance: 2,000 v Primera División, Day Month, Year
- Highest away attendance: 1,000 v Primera División, San Salvador, Day Month, Year
- Highest average attendance, season: 49,176, Primera División
- Most goals scored, season, Primera División: 25, TBD
- Worst season: Segunda Division 2002-2003: 1 win, 4 draws and 17 losses (7 points)
- First CONCACAF tournament match (2023 CONCACAF Central American Cup): vs 1–4 TBD; Estadio, Location; Day Month, Year
- Largest Home victory, CONCACAF tournament match (2023 CONCACAF Central American Cup): 5-1 v TBD, 2023
- Largest Away victory, CONCACAF tournament match (2023 CONCACAF Central American Cup): 3-0 v TBD, 2023
- Largest Home loss, CONCACAF tournament match (2023 CONCACAF Central American Cup): 0-4 v TBD, Day Month, Year
- Largest Away loss, CONCACAF tournament match (2023 CONCACAF Central American Cup): 0-5 v TBD, Day Month, Year

=== Individual records ===
- Record appearances (all competitions): TBD, 822 from 1957 to 1975
- Record appearances (Primera Division): Honduran TBD, 150 from 2024 to Present
- Most capped player for El Salvador: 63 (0 whilst at Cacahuatique), Juan Jose Gomez
- Most international caps for El Salvador while a Cacahuatique player: 3, Juan Carlos Argueta
- Most caps won whilst at Cacahuatique: 3, TBDa.
- Record scorer in league: Salvadorian Alexander Marquez, 8
- Most goals in a season (all competitions): TBD, 62 (1927/28) (47 in League, 15 in Cup competitions)
- Most goals in a season (Primera Division): Argentinian TBD, 15
- First goal scorer in International competition: Argentinian TBD (v. TBD; Estadio TBD, TBD; Day Month, Year)
- Most goals in a CONCACAF competitions: 1, Argentinian TBD
- Most appearance in a CONCACAF competitions: TBD
- Oldest player to appear for Cacahuatique: Cristian Portillo 39 years, 9 months
- Fastest goalscorer in a Primera Division: 13 seconds, Bryan Lovo vs. FAS, March 3, 2025.

== Current squad ==
As of July, 2026 Note: Flags indicate national team as defined under FIFA eligibility rules; some limited exceptions apply. Players may hold more than one non-FIFA nationality.

No.	Pos.	Nation	Player
1	GK	ESA	Wilberth Hernández
2	DF	ESA	Reinaldo Aparicio (captain)
3	DF	ESA	Ronald Padilla
4	DF	ESA	Didier Robles
5	DF	ESA	Francisco Carballo
6	MF	ARG	Elías Umeres
7	DF	ESA	William Canales
9	FW	ARG	Hernán González
10	MF	TTO	Jomal Williams
11	FW	ESA	Juan Sanchez
14	MF	ESA	Herbert Sosa
15	DF	ESA	José Galindo
16	DF	ESA	Fabricio Herrera

No.	Pos.	Nation	Player
17	MF	ESA	Melvin Alfaro
19	MF	ESA	Misael Palacios
21	DF	ESA	Eduardo Hernández
22	MF	ESA	Byron Mendoza
23	FW	ESA	Paolo Ulloa
24	DF	ESA	Guillermo Fuentes
25	FW	ECU	Danny Cetré
26	MF	ESA	César Márquez
28	MF	ESA	Bladimir González
30	GK	PAN	Jeremy Rodríguez
31	FW	ESA	Luis Cruz
35	GK	ESA	Cristián Bonilla
37	MF	ESA	Anderson Portillo

=== Players with dual citizenship ===
- (El Salvador) (Panama) Jeremy Rodríguez

=== In ===
Note: Flags indicate national team as defined under FIFA eligibility rules; some limited exceptions apply. Players may hold more than one non-FIFA nationality.

No.	Pos.	Nation	Player
—		ECU	Danny Cetré (From Fuerte San Francisco)
—	FW	ESA	Juan Sánchez (From Free Agent)
—	GK	ESA	Wilberth Hernández (From LA Firpo)
—		ESA	Salvador Galindo (From El Vencedor)
—	DF	ESA	William Canales (From Alianza)

No.	Pos.	Nation	Player
—	FW	TTO	Jomal Williams (From Achuapa)
—		ESA	Melvin Alfaro (From Zacatecoluca)
—		ARG	Hernán González (From Sarmiento de Resistencia)

=== Out ===
Note: Flags indicate national team as defined under FIFA eligibility rules; some limited exceptions apply. Players may hold more than one non-FIFA nationality.

No.	Pos.	Nation	Player
—	GK	ESA	Danilo Joya (To Alianza)
—	DF	ESA	Jonathan Quintanilla (To Fuerte San Francisco)
—		ESA	Daniel Arévalo (To TBD)
—		ESA	Oscar Ceren (To LA Firpo)
—		COL	Luis Hinestroza (To TBD)
—		BRA	Alesson Ferreira (To TBD)

No.	Pos.	Nation	Player
—		COL	Diomer Hinestroza (To TBD)
—		ESA	Óscar de la O (To TBD)
—		ESA	Jose Luis Rodriguez (To TBD)
—		ESA	Daniel Márquez (To Aguila)
—		ESA	Alexander Márquez (To Aguila)

== Coaching staff ==
As of January 2026

Position	Staff
Manager	(El Salvador) Cristian Portillo (Interim)
Assistant Manager	(El Salvador) Cristian Portillo (*)
Reserve Manager	(El Salvador) Cristian Portillo (*)
Ladies's Manager	(El Salvador) Kelvin Gomez
Under 17's Manager	(El Salvador) TBD
Physical coach	(El Salvador) Luis Portillo (*)
Assistant Physical coach	(El Salvador) TBD
Goalkeeper Coach	(El Salvador) Manuel Meme Gonzalez (*)
Kineslogic	(El Salvador) Edson Molina (*)
Utility Equipment	(El Salvador) Pablo de la O
Football director	(El Salvador) Cristian Portillo
Team Doctor	(El Salvador) TBD

== Management ==
Position	Staff
Owner	(El Salvador) Asociación Deportiva Ciudad Barrios
President	(El Salvador) Lic. Juan Amaya
Vice-President	(El Salvador) Arq. Carlos Méndez
Gerente Deportivo	(El Salvador) Dr. Ricardo Burrutia
Sports Director	(El Salvador) Marvin Hernández
Team-Representative	(El Salvador)

== List of coaches ==
As of January 6, 2026

Name	Nat	Tenure	Win-Draw-Loss
Marvin Hernández	(El Salvador)	2017	see below
Willian Chevez	(El Salvador)	2018– May 2019	0-0-0
Omar Sevilla	(El Salvador)	June 2019 - September 2019	see below
Eraldo Correia	(Brazil)	September 2019- January 2020	0-0-0
Marvin Hernández	(El Salvador)	February 2020 -April 2021	0-0-0
Efrain Solano	(Colombia)	April 2021-June 2021	0–0–0
Omar Sevilla	(El Salvador)	June 2021-June 2022	0-0-0
Jorge Abrego	(El Salvador)	June 2022 - December 2022	0–0–0
Carlos Romero	(El Salvador)	January 2023 - July 2023	0-0-0
Nelson Ancheta	(El Salvador)	July 2023 - August 2023	0–0–0
Ivan Ruiz	(El Salvador)	August 2023 - January 2024	0–0–0
Pablo Quiñones	(Uruguay)	January 2024 - July 2024	0–0–0
Daniel Corti	(Argentina)	July 2024 - March 2025	17–9–10
Victor Coreas	(El Salvador)	March 2025 - May 2025	3–4–6
Pablo Quiñones	(Uruguay)	June 2025 - December 2025	8–6–12
Ángel “Nino” Piazzi	(Argentina)	January 2026 - September 2026	0–0–0
Cristian Portillo Interim	(El Salvador)	September 2026 - Present	0–0–0

=== Notable managers ===
The following managers have won at least one trophy while in charge at Cachuatique:

The following managers won at least one trophy when in charge of Cacahuatique
Name	Period	Trophies
(El Salvador) Willian Chevez	2018 - May 2019	1 Tercera Division Salvadorean (2018 Apertura)
(El Salvador) Omar Sevilla	June 2019 - September 2019; June 2021-June 2022	1 Runner up Segunda División Salvadorean (Apertura 2021)
(El Salvador) Ivan Ruiz	August 2023 - January 2024	1 Runner up Segunda División Salvadorean (Apertura 2023)
(Uruguay) Pablo Quiñones	January 2024- July 2024; June 2025 - December 2025	1 Segunda División Salvadorean (Clausura 2024), 1 Playoff winner (2023-24)

== List of notable players ==
=== Internationals who have played at Cacahuatique ===
Players marked in bold gained their caps while playing at Cacahuatique.

- (El Salvador) Meme Gonzalez
- (El Salvador) Juan Carlos Argueta
- (El Salvador) Rommel Mejia
- (El Salvador) Óscar Cerén
- (El Salvador) Herbert Sosa

== Other departments ==
=== Football ===
==== Reserve team ====
The reserve team serves mainly as the final stepping stone for promising young players under the age of 21 before being promoted to the main team. The second team is coached by Cristian Portillo. the team played in the Primera División Reserves, their greatest successes were semifinalist in the Reserve championships in the Clausura 2026. It plays its home matches at Polideportivo de Chapeltique, adjacent to the first teams and women's team.

Name	Nat	Tenure	Notes
TBD	(El Salvador)	June 2025	N/A
Cristian Portillo (*)	(El Salvador)	June 2025 - Present	N/A

=== Current squad ===
As of: June, 2025 Note: Flags indicate national team as defined under FIFA eligibility rules; some limited exceptions apply. Players may hold more than one non-FIFA nationality.

No.	Pos.	Nation	Player
—		ESA	TBD
—		ESA	TBD
—		ESA	TBD
—		ESA	TBD
—		ESA	TBD

No.	Pos.	Nation	Player
—		ESA	TBD
—		ESA	TBD
—		ESA	TBD
—		ESA	TBD
—		ESA	TBD

==== Junior teams ====
The youth team (under 17 and under 15) has produced some of El Salvador's top football players, including TBD and TBD. It plays its home matches at TBD, adjacent to the first team's ground, and it is coached by Carlos Padilla (under 17) and Juan (Under 15). The team greatest successes was winning Clausura 2025 season.

Name	Nat	Tenure
TBD	(El Salvador)	N/A
TBD	(El Salvador)	N/A
TBD	(El Salvador)	2025 - Present

=== Current squad ===
As of: June, 2025 Note: Flags indicate national team as defined under FIFA eligibility rules; some limited exceptions apply. Players may hold more than one non-FIFA nationality.

No.	Pos.	Nation	Player
—		ESA	TBD
—		ESA	TBD
—		ESA	TBD
—		ESA	TBD
—		ESA	TBD

No.	Pos.	Nation	Player
—		ESA	TBD
—		ESA	TBD
—		ESA	TBD
—		ESA	TBD
—		ESA	TBD

==== Women's team ====
The women's first team, which is led by head coach Kelvin Gomez, features several members of the El Salvador national ladies team. Their greatest successes were reaching the semi finals of Apertura 2023, where they lost 10–1 on aggregate to Alianza Women's.

Name	Nat	Tenure
Kelvin Gomez	(El Salvador)	June 2025 - Present

=== Current squad ===
As of: May, 2026 Note: Flags indicate national team as defined under FIFA eligibility rules; some limited exceptions apply. Players may hold more than one non-FIFA nationality.

No.	Pos.	Nation	Player
—		ESA	Nidia Lovo
—		ESA	Nidia Zelaya
—	FW	ESA	Jacqueline Sosa
—		ESA	Leyli Hernandez
—		ESA	Mayreni Amaya
—		ESA	Heisy Benitez
—		ESA	Yulissa Aguilar
—		ESA	Josseline Ortiz
—		ESA	Paola Zelaya

No.	Pos.	Nation	Player
—		ESA	TBD
—		ESA	TBD
—		ESA	TBD
—		ESA	TBD
—		ESA	TBD

=== In ===
Note: Flags indicate national team as defined under FIFA eligibility rules; some limited exceptions apply. Players may hold more than one non-FIFA nationality.

No.	Pos.	Nation	Player
—	MF	ESA	Jacqueline Sosa (From Fuerte San Francisco Femenino)
—	FW	ESA	Maireny Amaya (From Aguila Femenino)
—		ESA	Katerin de la O (From Aguila Femenino)
—	GK	ESA	Milena Vasquez (From TBD)
—	MF	ESA	Adriana Flores (From TBD)

No.	Pos.	Nation	Player
—	MF	ESA	Virginia Flores (From TBD)
—	FW	ESA	Andrea Serrano (From TBD)
—	FW	ESA	Gissela Rodriguez (From TBD)
—	DF	ESA	Ana Flores (From TBD)
—		ESA	TBD (From TBD)

=== Out ===
Note: Flags indicate national team as defined under FIFA eligibility rules; some limited exceptions apply. Players may hold more than one non-FIFA nationality.

No.	Pos.	Nation	Player
—		ESA	Sofia Hernandez (To Aguila Femenino)
—		ESA	TBD (To TBD)
—		ESA	TBD (To TBD)

No.	Pos.	Nation	Player
—		ESA	TBD (To TBD)
—		ESA	TBD (To TBD)
—		ESA	TBD (To TBD)
