= Santiago de María =

Coordinates: 13°29′N 88°28′W

Santiago de María is a municipality in the Usulután department of El Salvador. It has one of the strongest economies in El Salvador due to small private businesses and an entrepreneurial culture. It has a population of 20,032.

== Climate ==
Climate data for Santiago de María (1991–2020)
Month	Jan	Feb	Mar	Apr	May	Jun	Jul	Aug	Sep	Oct	Nov	Dec	Year
Mean daily maximum °C (°F)	28.2 (82.8)	29.4 (84.9)	30.1 (86.2)	29.8 (85.6)	28.5 (83.3)	27.7 (81.9)	28.5 (83.3)	28.3 (82.9)	27.1 (80.8)	26.8 (80.2)	27.2 (81.0)	27.6 (81.7)	28.3 (82.9)
Daily mean °C (°F)	21.7 (71.1)	22.4 (72.3)	23.0 (73.4)	23.4 (74.1)	23.0 (73.4)	22.7 (72.9)	23.2 (73.8)	22.8 (73.0)	22.0 (71.6)	21.8 (71.2)	21.8 (71.2)	21.7 (71.1)	22.5 (72.5)
Mean daily minimum °C (°F)	17.2 (63.0)	17.6 (63.7)	18.3 (64.9)	19.4 (66.9)	19.7 (67.5)	19.5 (67.1)	19.4 (66.9)	19.3 (66.7)	19.1 (66.4)	19.0 (66.2)	18.3 (64.9)	17.6 (63.7)	18.7 (65.7)
Average precipitation mm (inches)	2.9 (0.11)	2.8 (0.11)	9.0 (0.35)	53.4 (2.10)	258.9 (10.19)	308.0 (12.13)	245.8 (9.68)	334.9 (13.19)	410.7 (16.17)	375.1 (14.77)	94.1 (3.70)	10.3 (0.41)	2,105.9 (82.91)
Average relative humidity (%)	65	63	64	72	81	82	76	80	87	85	75	68	74.8
Source: Ministerio de Medio Ambiente y Recursos Naturales
