= C.D. Pipil =

Association football club in El Salvador

- Full name: Club Deportivo Pipil
- Founded: 1979
- Ground: Estadio Vicente Paul Fuentes
- Chairman: (El Salvador)
- Manager: (El Salvador) Ciro Romero
- League: (El Salvador) Tercera División
- Grupo
Home colours

Club Deportivo Pipil is a Salvadoran professional football club based in Cacaopera, Morazán, El Salvador. The club currently plays in the Tercera Division of El Salvador.

== History ==
On 29 May 2022, Pipil won the Clausura 2022 Tercera Division against Cruzeiro 3–1 with the goals came from two goals from Alexis Gato Alvarenga and Jvaier Luna. This allowed Pipil to play promotion game against Audaz, Pipil won 3–1 on penalties after the game was tied 0-0 after extra time and were promoted to the Segunda Division for the first time. However the level of play was too high for Pipil and At the end of the 2023–24 season, Pipil were relegated back to Tercera Division.

== Honours ==
=== League ===
- Tercera División de Fútbol Salvadoreño and predecessors
  - Champions: (1) : Clausura 2022
  - Runners up: (1) : Clausura 2025
- La Asociación Departamental de Fútbol Aficionado' and predecessors (4th tier)
  - Champions (1): 2019

== Sponsors ==
- Diseño Sport
- Mascarello
- Turicentro Apalipul

== Current squad ==
As of: July, 2025 Note: Flags indicate national team as defined under FIFA eligibility rules; some limited exceptions apply. Players may hold more than one non-FIFA nationality.

| No. | Pos. | Nation | Player |
|---|---|---|---|
| — | | SLV | Adilson Romero |
| — | | SLV | Brian Fuentes |
| — | | SLV | Jorge Gómez |
| — | | SLV | Deris Escobar |
| — | | SLV | Carlos Benítez |
| — | | SLV | Kevin Gómez |
| — | | SLV | Adrián Chicas |
| — | | SLV | Alan Márquez |
| — | | SLV | Angel Díaz |
| — | | SLV | Yonatan Majano |
| — | | SLV | Kevin Argueta |
| — | | SLV | Kevin Espinal |
| — | | SLV | Boris García |
| — | | SLV | Gerson Hernández |
| — | | SLV | Fredis Argueta |
| — | | SLV | German Ventura |
| — | | SLV | Franklin Portillo |

| No. | Pos. | Nation | Player |
|---|---|---|---|
| — | | SLV | Diego Maldonado |
| — | | SLV | Cristian Grandos |
| — | | SLV | Carlos Alvarenga |
| — | | SLV | Nicolás Ruiz |
| — | | SLV | Wilber Chicas |

=== Players with dual citizenship ===
- (El Salvador) (United States) TBD

=== In ===
Note: Flags indicate national team as defined under FIFA eligibility rules; some limited exceptions apply. Players may hold more than one non-FIFA nationality.

| No. | Pos. | Nation | Player |
|---|---|---|---|
| — | | SLV | Cristian Saenz (From Cacaopera FC) |
| — | | SLV | Cristian Herrnandez (From Escuela de Futbol El Rosario) |
| — | | SLV | Alexander Pereira (From TBD) |
| — | | SLV | Denis Guevara (From TBD) |
| — | | SLV | Juan Pablo Romero (From Escuela de Futbol El Rosario) |

| No. | Pos. | Nation | Player |
|---|---|---|---|
| — | | SLV | Axer Lopez (From TBD) |
| — | | SLV | Henry Alberto Guzman (From TBD) |
| — | | SLV | Diego Isaac Lopez (From TBD) |
| — | | SLV | Amilcar David Iglesias (From TBD) |
| — | | SLV | TBD (From TBD) |

=== Out ===
Note: Flags indicate national team as defined under FIFA eligibility rules; some limited exceptions apply. Players may hold more than one non-FIFA nationality.

| No. | Pos. | Nation | Player |
|---|---|---|---|
| — | | SLV | TBD (To TBD) |
| — | | SLV | TBD (To TBD) |
| — | | SLV | TBD (To TBD) |
| — | | SLV | TBD (To TBD) |
| — | | SLV | TBD (To TBD) |

| No. | Pos. | Nation | Player |
|---|---|---|---|
| — | | SLV | TBD (To TBD) |
| — | | SLV | TBD (To TBD) |
| — | | SLV | TBD (To TBD) |

== Coaching staff ==
As of January 2026

| Position | Staff |
|---|---|
| Manager | (El Salvador) Marvin Rosales |
| Assistant Manager | (El Salvador) Julio Roberto Romero |
| Physical coach | (El Salvador) Richard Claros |
| Goalkeeper Coach | (El Salvador) Ulises Alexander Dubón |
| Kineslogist | (El Salvador) Cristian González |
| Utility Equipment | (El Salvador) Luis Hernández |
| Utility Equipment | (El Salvador) Felipe Ayala |
| Football director | (El Salvador) TBD |
| Team Doctor | (El Salvador) TBD |

== Directos staff ==
As of August 2023

| Position | Staff |
|---|---|
| President | (El Salvador) Wilian Emeldo Ramírez |
| Vice President | (El Salvador) Jesús Neftalí Cruz |
| Secretary | (El Salvador) Vidnia Arriaza |
| Assistant secretary | (El Salvador) Juan Carlos Fuentes |
| Treasury | (El Salvador) Juan José Ortega |
| Assistant Treasury | (El Salvador) Walter Antonio Alvarado |
| First Directory | (El Salvador) Herson Ulises Fuentes |
| Second Directory | (El Salvador) Santos Reyes Pérez |
| Third Directory | (El Salvador) Jose Francisco Perreira |
| Fourth Directory | (El Salvador) Gerardo Antonio Romero |
| Fifth Directory | (El Salvador) Santos Elena Ramírez |
| Club representative | (El Salvador) Transito Daniel Romero |
| Assistant Club representative | (El Salvador) Esmeraldo Chávez Cornejo |

== List of coaches ==
- (El Salvador) Óscar Eduardo Amaya (June 2022-Present)
- (El Salvador) Marvín Rosales (March 2024- June 2024)
- (El Salvador) Ciro Romero (July 2024 - December 2025)
- (El Salvador) Marvín Rosales (January 2026 - Present)
