= Corinto, El Salvador =

Corinto
- Municipality
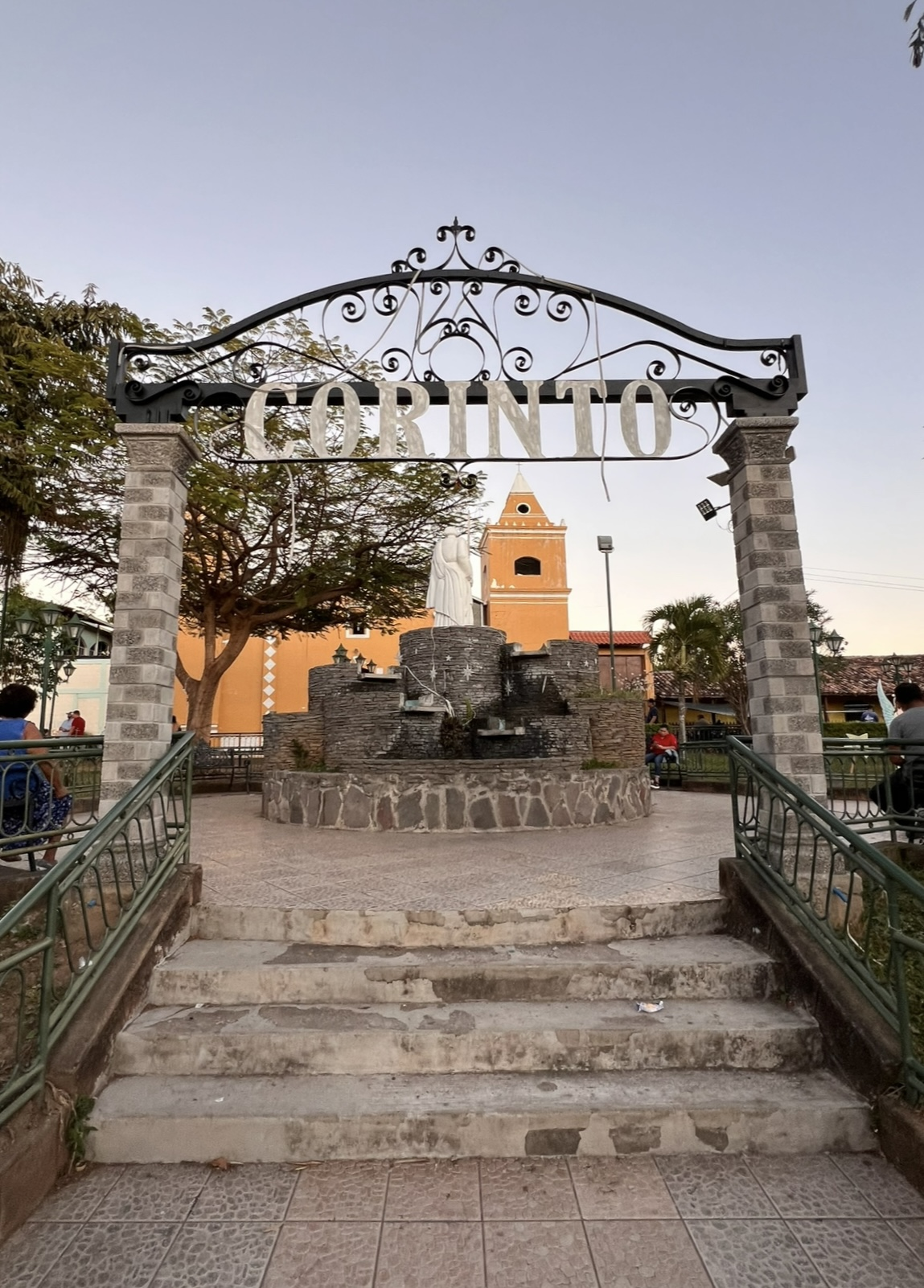
- Central Plaza in Corinto, Morazan

- Flag

- Location in El Salvador
- Coordinates: 13°48′32″N 87°58′09″W
- Country: El Salvador
- Department: Morazán Department
- Elevation: 2,753 ft (839 m)

Population
  - Total: About 10,000

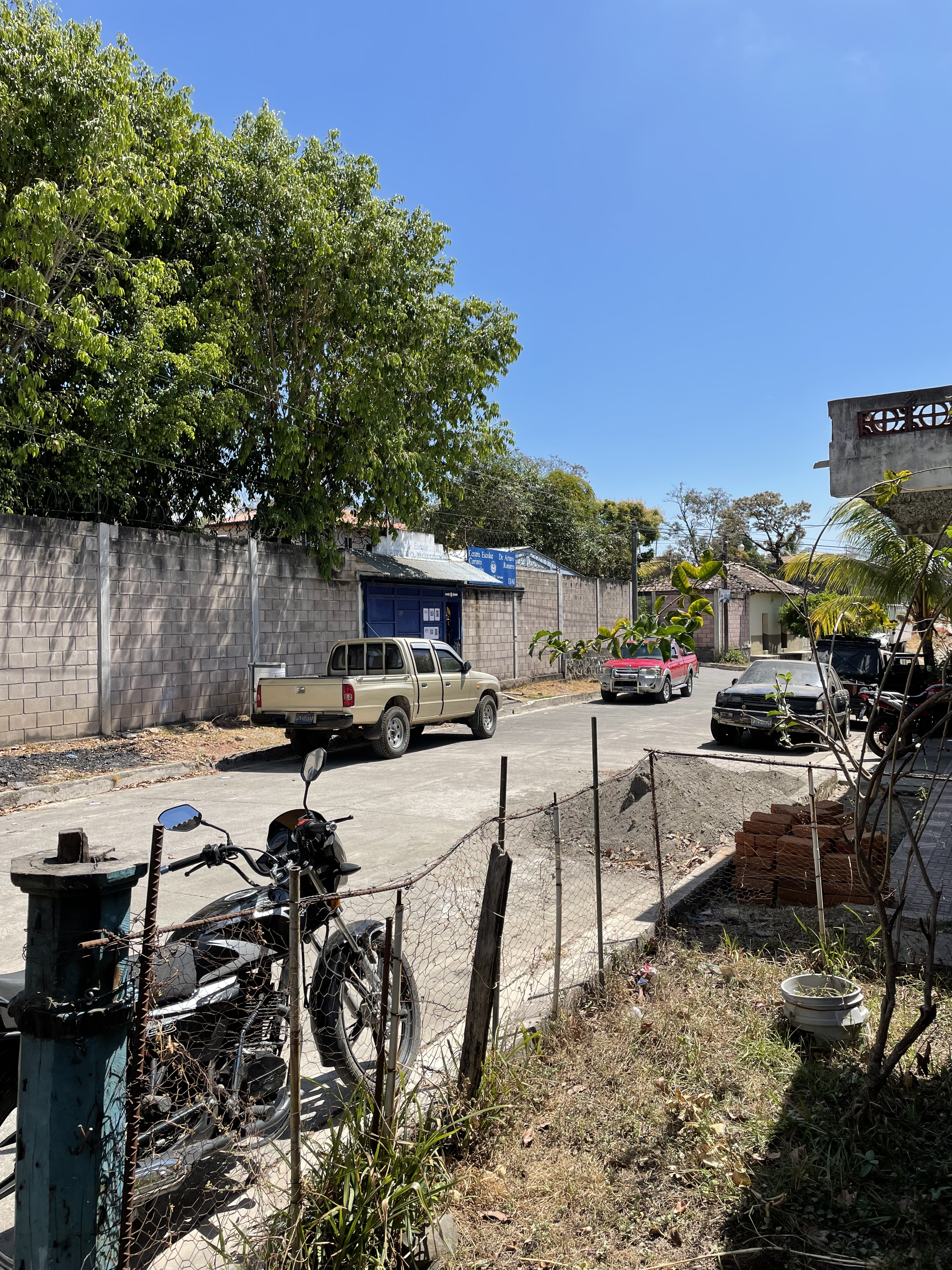
Street in Corinto

Corinto is a municipality in the Morazán department of El Salvador. "La Gruta del Espíritu Santo" (The Holy Spirit Grotto) is a local tourist attraction, a registered National Monument of petroglyphs. The archaeologist Wolfgang Haberland performed studies in the late 1970s indicating the art belongs to the pre-Classic stage. Although there has been much speculation about the population of the city, it is estimated at 10 thousand people. The cuisine of the region is similar to most of Central America: a lot of fruit, corn tamales, and pupusas.
