= List of football clubs in El Salvador =

List of football clubs in El Salvador sorted by division:

== Primera División (2023/24 seasons) ==
Team	Home city	Stadium	Capacity
Santa Tecla F.C.	Santa Tecla, La Libertad	Estadio Las Delicias	10,000
Alianza F.C.	San Salvador	Estadio Cuscatlán	45,925
C.D. FAS	Santa Ana	Estadio Óscar Quiteño	15,000
C.D. Águila	San Miguel	Juan Francisco Barraza	10,000
A.D. Isidro Metapán	Metapán, Santa Ana	Estadio Jorge Calero Suárez	8,000
Dragón	San Miguel, El Salvador	Estadio Juan Francisco Barraza	10,000
Jocoro F.C.	Jocoro, Morazán	Complejo Deportivo Tierra de Fuego	10,000
Platense	Zacatecoluca	Estadio Panorámico de Zacatecoluca	10,000
Fuerte San Francisco	San Francisco Gotera, Morazán	Estadio Correcaminos	
C.D. Luis Ángel Firpo	Usulután	Estadio Sergio Torres	5,000
Once Deportivo de Ahuachapan	Ahuachapán	Estadio Simeón Magaña	
C.D. Municipal Limeño	Santa Rosa de Lima, La Unión	Estadio José Ramón Flores	5,000

== Segunda División de Fútbol Salvadoreño (2019/20 seasons) 2002/03 ==
=== Grupo Centro Occidente ===
Team	City	Home Stadium
C.D. Atlético Apopa	(El Salvador) Apopa, San Salvador	Estadio Joaquín Gutiérrez
C.D. Brujos Mario Calvo	(El Salvador) Izalco, Sonsonate	Estadio Salvador Mariona
C.D. Municipal Ilopaneco	(El Salvador) Ilopango, San Salvador	Estadio Azteca
C.D. Once Lobos	(El Salvador) Chalchuapa, San Ana	Estadio Cesar Hernández
C.D. Rácing Junior	(El Salvador) Armenia, Sonsonate	Estadio 21 de Noviembre
A.D Santa Rosa Guachipilin	(El Salvador) Santa Rosa Guachipilin, Santa Ana	Estadio José Hernández
C.D. Alacranes 33	(El Salvador) Chalatenango	Complejo Deportivo Mario Jovel
EF San Pablo Tacachico	(El Salvador) San Pablo Tacachico, La Libertad	Estadio Valle Mesa
C.S.D. Vendaval	(El Salvador) Apopa, San Salvador	Joaquín Gutiérrez de Apopa
C.D. Atlético Marte	(El Salvador) San Salvador	Estadio Cuscatlan

=== Grupo Centro Oriente ===
The team name	City	Home Stadium
C.D. Chagüite	(El Salvador) Lolotiquillo, Morazán	Estadio Correcaminos
C.D. Aspirante	(El Salvador) Jucuapa, Usulután	Estadio Municipal de Jucuapa
C.D. Liberal	(El Salvador) Quelepa, San Miguel	Estadio Jaguar de Piedra
C.D. Fuerte San Francisco	(El Salvador) San Francisco Gotera, Morazán	Estadio Luis Amílcar Moreno
Independiente F.C.	(El Salvador) San Vicente	Estadio Jiboa
C.D. El Vendedor	(El Salvador) Santa Elena, Usulután	Estadio José Germán Rivas
C.D. UDET	(El Salvador) El Tránsito, San Miguel	Cancha César Antonio Ángulo
C.D. Platense	(El Salvador) Zacatecoluca, La Paz	Estadio Antonio Toledo Valle
C.D. Topiltzín	(El Salvador) Jiquilisco, Usulután	Estadio Topiltzín de Jiquilisco
C.D. Dragón	(El Salvador) San Miguel	Juan Francisco Barraza
C.D. Deportivo de Ahuachapán	(El Salvador) Ahuachapán	Estadio Simone Magaña

== Tercera Division de Fútbol Salvadoreño (2019/20 seasons) ==
=== Group A ===
- Real Pajonal
- Joroco F.C. Sport
- C.D. Vendaval (San Isidro, Izalco)
- Nuevo San Sebastián
- ADET (Atiquizaya)
- Racing Jr
- C.D. Huracán
- C.D. Espartano (San Julián)
- Santa Rosa FC
- Arce Cara Sucia
- Fuerte San Isidro
- CD Venados Junior
- Atletico San Alejo
- Agave FC
- Toros FC
- C.D. Apareca
- Independiente Nacional 1906
- Santa Tecla F.C.
- C.D. San Luis
- C.D. Universidad Centroamericana
- C. D. H-13
- C.D. Telecomunicación
- C.D. Atletico Balboa

=== Group B ===
- Turín FESA F.C. (Turín)
- San Jerónimo Nejapa
- Nejapa FC
- C.D. San Rafael Maracaná
- ADLER
- ADO Municipal
- Cojutepeque F.C.
- C.D. Talleres jr.
- San Martín
- C.D. Ilopaneco
- Corinto F.C.
- Municipal Santa María
- Atletico Comalapa
- El Roble
- A.D. Chalatenango Sport
- A.F.l. F.C.
- Municipal llopaneco
- Leones de Occidente
- Fuerte San Francisco (Resvers)
- A.D. Isidro Metapán C
- A.D.I. F.C.
- C.D. Platense (Resvers)

=== Group A ===
- C.D. UES
- Municipal Limeño (Resvers)
- C.D. Real San Esteban
- Berlín FC
- C.D. Halcón Municipal
- Sensunte Cabañas
- C.D. Atlético San Lorenzo
- C.D. El Remolino
- Luis Ángel Firpo (Thirds)
- C.D. Santiagueño
- C.D. San Sebastián
- C.D. California
- C.D. TACA
- C.D. Vista Hermosa
- San Salvador FC
- EF Santa Pablo (Tacachico)
- C.D. Vendaval Apopa
- Santa Rosa Guachipilin
- F.C. San Rafael Cedro
- Telecom F.C.
- Colo-Cola F.C.
- A.D. Leones de Occidente
- Atletico San Alejo

=== Group B ===
- C.D. Huracán
- C.D. Chagüite
- El Vencedor
- C.D. Liberal
- C.D. UDET (El Tráncito)
- C.D. Liberal
- C.D. Perlas
- C.D. Maracaná
- C.D. Marte Soyapango
- C.D. Los Andes
- C.D. Arcense
- C.D. Once Deportivo Ahuachapán
- C.D. Brasilia
- C.D. Topiltzin
- Real Destroyer F.C.
- C.D. Pasaquina
- C.D. Platense
- llopaneco F.C.
- Quequeisque F.C.
- Atletico Charrastique
- C.D. Libertal Ismael Rodríguez
- C.D. Juventud Olimpia Metallo
- C.D. llopaneco
- Real San Esteban
- Atletico Morazán
- C.D. Tehuacán
- Maracaná San Rafael
- Jalacatal F.C.
- Once Municipal
- Chinameca S.C.

== Defunct clubs ==
- AD Municipal (Juayúa, Sonsonate)
- A.F.I
- C.D. Águila San Isidro
- C.D. Alacrán
- Arcense
- C.D. Atlético Chaparratique
- Atlético Juvenil
- Atlético Morazán
- Atlético Nacional
- Atlético San José
- C.D. Brazil
- C.D. Curazao
- C.D. Juventud Olímpica Metalio
- Chinameca Sporting Club
- C.D. Derbi San Vicente
- El Tercio (Usulután)
- España
- C.D. Espartano
- Espíritu Santo
- Estrellas del Sur
- C.D. Estrella Roja
- Estudiantes F.C.
- Fuerte Aguilares
- Guadalupano
- Inca Súper Flat
- Juventud Alegre (Candelaria de la Frontera, Santa Ana)
- Juventud Cara Sucia (Cara Sucia)
- Malacoff
- Mario Calvo (Izalco)
- Masahuat F.C.
- C.D. Nueva Concepción
- Olímpico Litoral
- C.D. Quezaltepeque
- Real Destroyer
- C.D. Real Zaragoza
- Salvadoreño (Armenia)
- San José Sacare
- C.D. San Miguel
- San Pedro Masahuat
- San Salvador F.C.
- C.D. Santa Bárbara
- Santa María
- C.D Santiagueño
- TACA (Cantón Tacanahua, Ahuachapán)
- C.D. Tehuacán
- Titán
- Vista Hermosa
