= Tercera División de El Salvador =

Salvadoran association football league

- Founded: 1970; 56 years ago
- Folded: 2026; 0 years ago
- Country: El Salvador
- Confederation: CONCACAF
- Number of clubs: 40
- Level on pyramid: 3
- Promotion to: Segunda División
- Relegation to: ADFAS
- Domestic cup: Copa Presidente
- Last champions: Centro Oriente Izalco; Centro Occidente El Roble (2026 Clausura)
- Most championships: TBD ( titles each)
- Broadcaster(s): Canal 58; Facebook
- Website: www.elgrafico.com
- Current: 2025 Clausura

The Tercera División de El Salvador, commonly known as Tercera División, and officially known as Electrolit Tercera División for sponsorship reasons, is the men's third professional association football division of the Salvadoran football league system. Administered by Liga Nacional de Fútbol Profesional, it is contested by 40 teams, with the top two teams plus the winner of a play-off promoted to Segunda division and replaced by the three lowest-placed teams in that division.

== Structure ==
There are 40 clubs in Tercera Division divided into 4 groups of 10. They play in Apertura and Clausura. The clubs play every team in each group twice. The top four teams from each group, 16 teams in total, qualify for play-offs to determine the winner of the apertura and clausura title. The winners will be promoted to the Segunda División de El Salvador.

Similarly, the four clubs that finish at the bottom of Tercera Division are relegated to ADFA and are replaced by the top four clubs.

On 7 May 2026, FESFUT decided to fold Segunda Division and Tercera Division and create a new a leage called Liga de Ascenso de Futbol de El Salvador.

== Third Division Of Football Season 2024 Clubs ==
The following teams are competing in the 2025–26 Tercera División season.qq

Location of teams in 2024–2025 Tercera División de El Salvador

== All participants for the 2025/26 season ==
Team	Location	Stadium	Capacity
Academia BP	Nuevo Cuscatlán, La Libertad	Estadio Cancha Municipal La Florencia	5,000
Ancla de Oro	TBD	Estadio	TBD
Atletico Belén	TBD	Estadio	TBD
Atlético San Simón	San Simón, Morazán	Estadio Municipal San Simón	5,000
Atlético Verapaz	Verapaz, San Vicente	Estadio Verapaz	5,000
Audaz	Apastepeque, San Vicente	Estadio Municipal La Coyotera	5,000
Buenos Aires FC	Acajutla, Sonsonate	Cancha Cristóbal Alemán Alas	1,000
CD Buenos Aires	Osicala, Morazán	Estadio Municipal de Osicala	10,000
Brasil FC	Quelepa, San Miguel	Estadio Municipal de Quelepa	5,000
Brasilia F.C.	TBD	Estadio	1,000
El Roble	Ilobasco, Cabañas	Estadio Municipal de Ilobasco	10,000
El Vencedor	Santa Elena, Usulután	Estadio José Germán Rivas Lozano	5,000
Estrellas del Sur	Chirilagua, San Miguel	Estadio Municipal Carlos Moon	5,000
FORFUT	Ilobasco, Cabañas	Estadio Municipal de Ilobasco	10,000
Izalco	Izalco, Sonsonate	Estadio Salvador Mariona	5,000
Juventud Candelareño	Candelaria de la Frontera, Santa Ana	Estadio Municipal de Candeleria	5,000
La Hachaudura	TBD	Estadio	000
Marte Soyapango	Soyapango, San Salvador	Cancha Jorgito Meléndez	5,000
Municipal	TBD	Estadio	000
Nacional de Las Magaritas	TBD	Estadio	000
Nonualco	TBD	Estadio	000
Once Municipal	TBD	Estadio	000
Racing	TBD	Estadio	000
Real Sociedad	TBD	Estadio	000
Sal y Mar	Cantón Los Jiotes, San Alejo, La Unión	Estadio Marcerlino Imbers	0000
San Marcos	Jiquilisco, Usulután	Cancha San Marcos Lempa	0000
San Rafael Obrajuelo	San Rafael Obrajuelo, La Paz	Estadio José Borjas Castillo	0000
Santo Tomás	Tejutla, Chalatenango	Cancha Óscar Julián Regalado	0000
Santos	Ciudad Arce, La Libertad	Cancha Santa Rosa	5,000
SESSA	Guadalupe, San Vicente	Cancha Vista al Volcán	10,000
Sonics International Club	TBD	Estadio	1,000
Tenancingo	Tenancingo, Cuscatlán	Cancha Santa Cruz Michapa	5,000
Vendaval	Apopa, San Salvador	Estadio Joaquín Gutiérrez	10,000
Vista Hermosa	San Francisco Gotera, Morazán	Estadio Luis Amílcar Moreno	10,000

== Current directors of the third Division ==
=== Management ===
Name	Title	Ref.
Walter Carabantes López	President	

== Past champions in Tercera División de Fútbol Salvadoreño Trophy ==
- 1970–71 : CD Titán
- 1971–72 : CD Dragón
- 1972–73 : CD El Roble
- 1973–74 : A.D.O.
- 1974–75 : ADTE
- 1975–76 : CD Chaguite
- 1976–77 : A.F.I.
- 1977–78 : ADTE
- 1978–79 : A.F.I.
- 1979–80 : ADET
- 1980–81 : A.F.I.
- 1981–82 : CD Los Andes
- 1982–83 : CD Platense
- 1983–84 : ADTE
- 1984–85 : CD Tehuacán
- 1985–86 : ADET
- 1986–87 : AD Municipal
- 1987–88 : CD TACA
- 1988–89 : CD L.A. Firpo
- 1989–90 : CD Atlético Marte
- 1990–91 : CD Barcelona
- 1991–92 : CD Malacoff
- 1992–93 : ADTE
- 1993–94 : CD El Roble
- 1994–95 : A.F.I.
- 1995–96 : A.D.O.
- 1996–97 : Atlético Morazán
- 1997–98 : A.F.I.
- 1998–99 : CD Tehuacán
- 1999–2000 : CD Huracán
- 2000–01 : CD El Roble
- 2001–02 : CD L.Á. Firpo
- 2002–03 : A.D.O.
- 2003–04 : ADTE
- 2004–05 : Halcones
- 2005–06 : CD Curazao / Liberal I.R.
- 2006–07 : Tehuacán
- 2007–08 : Titán
- 2008–09 : Centro Occidente Brasilia (Apertura 2008, Promotion) / Espartano (Clausura 2009); Centro Oriente Liberal I.R. (Apertura 2008, Promotion) / Pasaquina (Clausura 2009)
- 2009–10 : Centro Occidente Turin-FESA (Apertura 2009) and (Clausura 2010); Centro Oriente Municipal Santa María (Apertura 2009) / Pasaquina FC (Clausura 2010, Promotion)
- 2010–11 : Centro Occidente Isidro Metapán C (Apertura 2010, Promotion) / Juventud Alegre (Clausura 2011); Centro Oriente San Sebastian (Apertura 2010) / C.D. La Asunción (Clausura 2011, Promotion)
- 2011–12 : Centro Occidente Atlético Comalapa (Apertura 2011) / Turín FC (Clausura 2012, Promotion); Centro Oriente C.D. Espíritu Santo (Apertura 2011, Promotion)
- 2012–13 : Centro Occidente CD Racing Jr. (Apertura 2012) / Chalatenango (Clausura 2013, Promotion); Centro Oriente Huracán FC (Apertura 2012) / Topiltzín (Clausura 2013, Promotion)
- 2013–14 : Centro Occidente Atlético Comalapa (Apertura 2013) and (Clausura 2014); Centro Oriente Fuerte San Francisco (Apertura 2013) / Audaz (Clausura 2014, Promotion)
- 2014–15 : Centro Occidente Turin-FESA (Apertura 2014) and (Clausura 2015); Centro Oriente Fuerte San Francisco (Apertura 2014) and (Clausura 2015)
- 2015–16 : Centro Occidente CD Racing Jr. (Apertura 2015) / Turin-FESA (Clausura 2016); Centro Oriente UDET (Apertura 2015) / Jocoro (Clausura 2016, Promotion)
- 2016–17 : Centro Occidente EF Guazapa (Apertura 2016) / Municipal Ilopaneco (Clausura 2017, Promotion); Centro Oriente UDET (Apertura 2016) / Chagüite (Clausura 2017)
- 2017–18 : Centro Occidente AD Santa Rosa Guachipilín (Apertura 2017, Promotion) / Turin-FESA (Clausura 2018); Centro Oriente Liberal (Apertura 2017, Promotion) / Ciclon del Golfo (Clausura 2018)
- 2018–19 : Centro Occidente Turin-FESA (Apertura 2018) / Real Pajonal (Clausura 2019); Centro Oriente Cacahuatique (Apertura 2018) / Gerardo Barrios (Clausura 2019)
- 2019–20 : Centro Occidente (Apertura 2019) / Clausura 2020); Centro Oriente (Apertura 2019) / (Clausura 2020)
- 2020–21 : Centro Occidente (Apertura 2020) / Clausura 2021); Centro Oriente (Apertura 2020) / (Clausura 2021)
- 2021–22 : Centro Occidente Fuerte Aguilares (Apertura 2021) /Masahuat (Clausura 2022); Centro Oriente Audaz (Apertura 2021) / Pipil (Clausura 2022)
- 2022–23 : Centro Occidente Los Laureles (Apertura 2022) and (Clausura 2023); Centro Oriente Santiagueño (Apertura 2022) / Cruzeiro (Clausura 2023)
- 2023–24 : Centro Occidente Brasilia (Apertura 2023) / AD Espartano (Clausura 2024); Centro Oriente Zacatecoluca FC (Apertura 2023) and (Clausura 2024)
- 2024–25 : Centro Occidente CD Talleres Jr. (Apertura 2024) and (Clausura 2025); Centro Oriente AD Santa Clara (Apertura 2024) / CD Neo Pipil (Clausura 2025, Promotion);
- 2025–26 : Centro Occidente Vendaval (Apertura 2025) / Izalco (Clausura 2026); Centro Oriente Racing de Gualuca (Apertura 2025) / El Roble (Clausura 2026)

== 2026–27 teams ==
=== Changes from the previous season ===
Teams promoted to Segunda División de Fútbol Salvadoreño

- Talleres Jr.
- CD Neo Pipil
- Sensunte Cabañas F.C.
- AD Juventud Independiente
- CD Pipil

Teams relegated to ADFA- Apertura 2026

- A.D. Nacional Las Margaritas
- Ancla de Oro F.C.
- Sonics International Club
- SESSA

failed to register for the Clausura 2025

- A.D. Santa Clara (Apertura 2024 Centro Occidente Champion)
- Atlas F.C.
- CD San Rafael Cedros
- Independiente FC
- Escuela futbol de Pasaquina

Teams promoted from ADFA - Apertura 2025

- Atletico Belén
- Nonualco F.C.
- Racing de Gualuca

New Teams or teams that purchased a spot in the Tercera Division

- Sonics International Club (Purchased spot of CD Aruba)
- Once Municipal (Purchased spot of CD Malacoff)
- Los Laureles F.C.
- A.D. Municipal
- Brasilia F.C.
- Real Sociedad de Morazán (Purchased spot of Tiburones FC)
- La Hachadura F.C.

Teams that failed to register for the Apertura 2025

- Malacoff (Sold their spot to CD Once Municipal)
- Aruba (Sold their spot to Sonics International Club)
- Atlas (Sold their spot to Ancla de Oro FC)
- Tiburones (Sold their spot to (CD Real Sociedad)
- Santiagueño FC
- A.D. Puerto El Triunfo

Teams that failed to register for the Clausura 2026

- TBD

=== Group A ===
Team namec	Founded	Hometown	Coaches
A.D. Municipal	1963	(El Salvador) Juayúa, Sonsonate	(El Salvador) Ricardo Antonio López (*)
Buenos Aires	19	(El Salvador) Acajutla, Sonsonate	(El Salvador) Ricardo Navarro (*)
Izalco	19	(El Salvador) Izalco, Sonsonate	(El Salvador) José Alfredo Portillo (*)
Juventud Candelareño *	1983	(El Salvador) Candelaria de la Frontera, Santa Ana	(El Salvador) TBD
La Hachaudura	2021	(El Salvador) La Hachadura, Sonsonate	(El Salvador) Rafael Rizo (*)
Once Municipal	1945	(El Salvador) Ahuachapán, Ahuachapán	(El Salvador) Henry Rojas (*)
Santos	19	(El Salvador) Ciudad Arce, La Libertad	(El Salvador) Eduardo Preza (*)
Sonics International Club	2019	(El Salvador) Sonsonate, Sonsonate	(El Salvador) Enio Mendoza (*)

=== Group B ===
Team name	Founded	Hometown	Coaches
Academia BP*	19	(El Salvador) Nuevo Cuscatlán, La Libertad	(El Salvador) Justino Umaña (*)
Atletico Belén	1988	(El Salvador) Soyapango, San Salvador	(El Salvador) TBD
Brasilia F.C.	19	(El Salvador) Suchitoto, Cuscatlán	(El Salvador) TBD
Marte Soyapango	2023	(El Salvador) Soyapango, San Salvador	(El Salvador) Lázaro Gutiérrez (*)
Nacional de Las Magaritas	1988	(El Salvador) Soyapango, San Salvador	(El Salvador) Osmaro Santos (*)
Santo Tomás	19	(El Salvador) Tejutla, Chalatenango	(El Salvador) Fabricio Trejo (*)
Vendaval	1927	(El Salvador) Apopa, San Salvador	(El Salvador) David Omar Sevilla (*)
AD Tenancingo	19	(El Salvador) Tenancingo, Cuscatlán	(El Salvador) Willie René Miranda

=== Grupo A ===
Nombre del equipo	Founded	Hometown	Coaches
Audaz	1948	(El Salvador) Apastepeque, San Vicente	(El Salvador) Omar Vásquez (*)
Atlético Verapaz	1938	(El Salvador) Verapaz, San Vicente	(El Salvador) Amancio Matías Mendoza (*)
El Roble	1989	(El Salvador) Ilobasco, Cabañas	(El Salvador) Jorge Abrego (*)
El Vencedor	1921	(El Salvador) Santa Elena, Usulután	(El Salvador) Giovanni Trigueros (*)
FORFUT	2016	(El Salvador) Ilobasco, Cabañas	(El Salvador) Alex Pineda (*)/ Alonzo Aguilar (*)
Nonualco	19	(El Salvador) Ilobasco, Cabañas	(El Salvador) Marlo Gómez (*)
San Marcos	1960	(El Salvador) San Marcos Lempa, Jiquilisco, Usulután	(El Salvador) Sebastian Hernández (*)
San Rafael Obrajuelo	1984	(El Salvador) San Rafael Obrajuelo, La Paz	(El Salvador) Ever Aguirre
SESSA	19	(El Salvador) Guadalupe, San Vicente	(Argentina) Julio Zamora (*)

=== Group B ===
Team name	Founded	Hometown	Coaches
Ancla de Oro	1963	(El Salvador) Cantón Huisquil, Conchagua, La Unión	(El Salvador) David Paz (*)
Atlético San Simón	1989	(El Salvador) San Simón, Morazán	(El Salvador) TBD
Brasil	1936	(El Salvador) Quelepa, San Miguel	(El Salvador) Roberto Mata (*)
Buenos Aires	1970	(El Salvador) Osicala, Morazán	(El Salvador) Víctor Coreas
Estrellas del Sur	1954	(El Salvador) Chirilagua, San Miguel.	(Colombia) Luis Carlos Asprilla (*)
Racing	19	(El Salvador) Gualuca, San Miguel	(El Salvador) Ervin Loza (*)
Real Sociedad de Morazán	1981	(El Salvador) Sociedad, Morazán	(El Salvador) Marvin Blanco (*)
Sal y Mar	1955	(El Salvador) Cantón Los Jiotes, San Alejo, La Unión	(Colombia) Gorge Chara (*)
Vista Hermosa	2013	(El Salvador) San Francisco Gotera, Morazán	(El Salvador) Eliseo Salamanca (*)

== Clubs who have competed in the Tecera Division, but not currently ==
As of June 2025

Club	Town or city	Last appearance in the Tercera Division	Current status (2024–25)	Level in pyramid
ADEREL Lourdes	Lourdes, Colón, La Libertad	Clausura 2024		
ADET	Talnique, La Libertad		Segunda División (merged with CD Aruba)	2
ADI	Intipucá, La Unión			
ADO				
ADO Municipal	San Luis La Herradura, La Paz			
A.F.I.	Ilobasco, Cabañas			
Academia de Fútbol Hernán López	Santo Domingo de Guzmán, Sonsonate			
Agave	Moncagua, San Miguel			
Aguila San Isidro	Chinameca, San Miguel			
CD Anamoros	Anamorós, La Unión			
CD Apaneca	Apaneca, Ahuachapán			
Apopa	Apopa, San Salvador			
Arcense	Ciudad Arce, La Libertad			
CD Armenia	Armenia, Sonsonate			
Aspirante	Jucuapa, Usulután			
Atlas	San Alejo, La Unión			
Atlas FC	Santiago Nonualco, La Paz	Apertura 2024		
Atlético Balboa	La Unión		Segunda División	2
Atletico Chaparrastique	Ciudad Barrios, San Miguel			
CD Atlético Comalapa	Comalapa, Chalatenango		Hiatus (2024-TBD)	N/A
CD Atlético Juvenil	Jocoaitique, Morazán			
Atlético Morazán				
CS Atlético San Nicolás	Tonacatepeque, San Salvador			
CD Barcelona	El Tamarindo			
Berlín F.C.	Berlín, Usulután			
CD Brasilia	Suchitoto, Cuscatlán		Hiatus (2025-Present)	N/A
CD Brujos	Izalco, Sonsonate			
Cabañas F.C .	Tejutepeque, Cabañas			
CD Cacahuatique	Ciudad Barrios, San Miguel		Primera Division	1
C.D. California	California, Usulután			
CD Cali Municipal	Caluco, Sonsonate			
Cangrejera F.C.	Puerto de La Libertad			
Cara Sucia FC	Cara Sucia, San Francisco Menéndez, Ahuachapán			
Chaguite	Lolotiquillo, Morazán			
Chalatenango	Chalatenango		Hiatus (2023-TBD)	N/A
Chinameca SC	Chinameca, San Miguel			
C.S. Ciclón del Golfo	La Unión			
Coca-Cola F.C.				
Cojutepeque F.C.	Cojutepeque, Cuscatlán			
CD Congoles	El Congo, Santa Ana			
Corinto FC	Corinto, Morazán		Hiatus (2024)	N/A
Cruzeiro	San Cayetano Istepeque, San Vicente		Segunda División	2
CD Divisadero	San Francisco Gotera, Morazán			
Dragón	San Miguel		Segunda División	2
A.D. Dulce Nombre de María	Dulce Nombre de María, Chalatenango			
C.D. El Cerrón	El Cerrón, Santa Ana			
El Paraíso	El Paraíso, Chalatenango			
El Roble	Ilobasco, Cabañas		Hiatus (2024-TBD)	N/A
AD El Tercio	Jiquilisco, Usulután			
España FC	San Buenaventura, Usulután			
CD España Adese				
Espartano	San Julián, Sonsonate		Segunda División	2
Estrella Roja	Santiago de María, Usulután	Clausura 2024		
Fuerte San Francisco	San Francisco Gotera, Morazán		Primera División	1
CD Fuerte San Isidro Lempa	La Libertad			
CD Gerado Barrios	San Rafael Oriente, San Miguel		ADFAS San Miguel	4
CD Hacienda Nueva	Lourdes, Colón, La Libertad			
CD Halcones Municipal				
Huracán	Atiquizaya, Ahuachapán		ADFA Ahuachapan	4
CD Ilopaneco	Ilopango, San Salvador			
Independiente FC	San Vicente	Apertura 2024		
AD Inter Sivar	San Salvador	Clausura 2023	Hiatus (2024)	N/A
AD Isidro Metapán C	Metapán, Santa Ana		Disbanded (2013)	N/A
Jalacatal F.C.	Cantón Jalacatal, San Miguel			
Jocoro FC	Jocoro, Morazán		Hiatus (2025-TBD)	N/A
Juventud 72 Cara Sucia	Cara Sucia, San Francisco Menéndez, Ahuachapán		Hiatus (2021-)	N/A
Juventud Independiente	San Juan Opico, La Libertad		ADFA San Salvador	4
CD Juventud Olimpica Metallo	Acajutla, Sonsonate		ADFA Sonsonate	4
C. D. La Palma	La Palma, Chalatenango		ADFAS Chalatenango	4
CD La Asunción			Disbanded (2018)	N/A
CD Leones Fronterizos	Pasaquina, La Unión			
AD Leones de Occidente			Disbanded (2016)	N/A
CD Liberal	Quelepa, San Miguel			
C.D. Liberal Ismael Rodríguez	San Rafael Oriente, San Miguel			
C.D. Los Andes	San Jorge, San Miguel	Clausura 2024		
Los Toros FC	Usulután		Disbanded (2016)	N/A
CD Magdalena	Chilanga, Morazán			
C.D. Maracaná	San Rafael Obrajuelo, La Paz			
CD Mar y Plata	Puerto El Triunfo, Usulután			
EFI Mario Calvo	Izalco, Sonsonate			
AD Masahuat	Masahuat, Santa Ana		Hiatus (2024-Present)	
A.D. Municipal	Juayúa, Sonsonate			
Municipal Ilopaneco	Ilopango, San Salvador			
Municipal Santa María	Santa María, Usulután			
Nejapa FC	Nejapa, San Salvador			
CD Nueva Concepción	Nueva Concepción, Chalatenango			
EF Nueva Concepción	Nueva Concepción, Chalatenango	Clausura 2024		
CD Nuevo San Sebastián	San Sebastián Salitrillo, Santa Ana			
Once Lobos	Chalchuapa, Santa Ana		Hiatus (2025-Present)	
AD Paraíso	El Paraíso, Chalatenango			
Escuela de Futbol de Pasaquina	Pasaquina, La Unión	Apertura 2024		
CD Platense	Zacatecoluca, La Paz		Primera División	1
Quequeisque F.C.	Santa Tecla, La Libertad			
C.D. Quezaltepeque	Quezaltepeque, La Libertad		Hiatus (2022-Present)	
CD Racing Jr	Armenia, Sonsonate		Hiatus (2024)	N/A
Real Antiguo Cuscatlán	Antiguo Cuscatlán, La Libertad			
Real Pajonal	San Antonio Pajonal, Santa Ana			
CD Real San Esteban	San Esteban Catarina, San Vicente			
A.D. Real Zaragoza	Zaragoza, La Libertad			
CD Salvadoreño	Armenia, Sonsonate		ADFAS Sonsonate	4
CD San Carlos Los Turcios	El Paisnal, San Salvador	Clausura 2024		
C.D. San Cayetano				
San Jerónimo Nejapa	Nejapa, San Salvador		ADFAS San Salvador	4
San Jorge				
CD San Luis	San Luis Talpa, La Paz			
CD San Pablo Municipal	San Pablo Tacachico, La Libertad		Hiatus (2024-TBD)	N/A
C.D. San Rafael Cedros	San Rafael Cedros, Cuscatlán	Apertura 2024		
A.D. Santa Clara	San Luis Talpa, La Paz	Apertura 2024		
Santa Rosa F.C.				
AD Santa Rosa Guachipilín	Santa Rosa Guachipilín, Santa Ana			
Sensunte Cabañas	Sensuntepeque, Cabañas			
SID Municipal	Santa Isabel Ishuatán, Sonsonate			
C.D. TACA	San Bartolomé Perulapía, Cuscatlán		ADFAS Cuscatlán	4
CD Tehuacán	Tecoluca, San Vicente		ADFAS San Vicente	4
Telecom F.C.				
CD Titán	Texistepeque, Santa Ana		Hiatus (2024-TBD)	N/A
CD Topiltzín	Jiquilisco, Usulután		Hiatus (2023-TBD)	N/A
A.D. Torino	Turín, Ahuachapán	Clausura 2024		
Turín-FESA FC	San Luis Talpa, La Paz		ADFAS San Salvador	4
C.D. UDET	El Tránsito, San Miguel		ADFAS San Miguel	4
CD UES	San Salvador		Hiatus (2021-Present)	N/A
CD Vencedor Junior				
C.D. Villa San Carlos				
CD Villalta	La Unión			

Note: Any Teams that haven't competed in any division within the last five years will be labelled as Hiatus as clubs in El Salvador have a history of taking breaks from competing and coming back into competition; if longer than five years it will assumed the clubs have officially folded and will be labelled as Disbanded.

== See also ==
- Football in El Salvador – overview of football sport
