= U.D. Santos =

Association football club in El Salvador

- Full name: Santos
- Ground: Cancha Santa Rosa, El Salvador
- League: Tercera División Salvadorean
Away colours

UD Santos is a Salvadoran football club based in Ciudad Arce, La Libertad Department, El Salvador.

The club currently plays in the Tercera Division de Fútbol Salvadoreño after purchasing a spot.

== Honours ==
=== Domestic honours ===
==== Leagues ====
- Tercera División Salvadorean and predecessors
  - Champions (2) : N/A
  - Play-off winner (2):
- La Asociación Departamental de Fútbol Aficionado and predecessors (4th tier)
  - Champions (1): La Libertad Department 2023–2024
  - Play-off winner (2):

== Current squad ==
As of: August 2025 Note: Flags indicate national team as defined under FIFA eligibility rules; some limited exceptions apply. Players may hold more than one non-FIFA nationality.

No.	Pos.	Nation	Player
—		SLV	Raul Roque
—		SLV	Johan Mendoza
—		SLV	Kevin Preza
—		SLV	Mauricio Alas
—		SLV	Raymundo Monje
—		SLV	Bryan Ponce
—		SLV	Diego Larios
—		SLV	Bladimir Caceres
—		SLV	Levi Herrera

No.	Pos.	Nation	Player
—		SLV	Angel Henriquez
—		SLV	Jeffry Ramirez
—		SLV	Wilfredo Martinez

=== Players with dual citizenship ===
- (El Salvador) (United States) TBD

=== In ===
Note: Flags indicate national team as defined under FIFA eligibility rules; some limited exceptions apply. Players may hold more than one non-FIFA nationality.

No.	Pos.	Nation	Player
—		SLV	Raul Roque (From Juventud Candelareño)
—		SLV	Johan Mendoza (From Atletico Belen)
—		SLV	Kevin Preza (From Vendaval)
—		SLV	Mauricio Alas (From Juventud Independiente)
—		SLV	Raymundo Monje (From Juventud Independiente)
—		SLV	TBD (From TBD)
—		SLV	TBD (From TBD)

No.	Pos.	Nation	Player
—		SLV	TBD (From TBD)
—		SLV	TBD (From TBD)
—		SLV	TBD (From TBD)

=== Out ===
Note: Flags indicate national team as defined under FIFA eligibility rules; some limited exceptions apply. Players may hold more than one non-FIFA nationality.

No.	Pos.	Nation	Player
—		SLV	TBD (To TBD)
—		SLV	TBD (To TBD)
—		SLV	TBD (To TBD)
—		SLV	TBD (To TBD)

No.	Pos.	Nation	Player
—		SLV	TBD (To TBD)
—		SLV	TBD (To TBD)
—		SLV	TBD (To TBD)

== List of coaches ==
- (El Salvador) Ricardo Ernesto Mancia
- (El Salvador) Eduardo Preza
