= C.D. Atlas La Unión =

Association football club in El Salvador

C.D. Atlas
- Full name: Club Deportivo Atlas
- Founded: 1937
- Ground: Cancha Municipal La Bruja; San Alejo, La Unión, El Salvador
- Manager: (El Salvador) Rafael Flores
- League: Tercera Division
Home colours

Club Deportivo Atlas is a Salvadoran professional football club based in San Alejo, La Unión, El Salvador.

The club currently plays in the Tercera Division de Fútbol Salvadoreño.

== Honours ==
=== Domestic honours ===
==== Leagues ====
- Tercera División de Fútbol Salvadoreño and predecessors
  - Champions (2) : N/A
  - Play-off winner (2):
- La Asociación Departamental de Fútbol Aficionado' and predecessors (4th tier)
  - Champions (1):
  - Play-off winner (2):

== Current squad ==
Note: Flags indicate national team as defined under FIFA eligibility rules; some limited exceptions apply. Players may hold more than one non-FIFA nationality.

No.	Pos.	Nation	Player
—	FW	SLV	Jonathan Salmeron
—	MF	SLV	Josué López
—	DF	SLV	Alexander Pacheco
—	FW	SLV	Emilio Girón

No.	Pos.	Nation	Player
—	MF	SLV	Jefferson Nuñez
—		SLV	
—		SLV	

== List of coaches ==
- (El Salvador) Rafael Flores (2019)
- (El Salvador) Óscar Álvarez (March 2020-)
- (El Salvador) William Chevez (October 2020- 2021)
- (El Salvador) Leonel Guevara (December 2022-July 2023)
- (El Salvador) William Chevez (August 2023-)
- (El Salvador) Rafael Flores (September 2023 -Present)
