= C.D. Nuevo San Sebastián =

Salvadoran football club

Club Deportivo San Sebastian
- Full name: Club Deportivo San Sebastian
- Nickname(s): TBD
- Founded: TBD
- Ground: Estadio San Sebastian Salitrillo, El Salvador
- Manager: (El Salvador) Mario Salguero
- League: Tercera Division de Fútbol Salvadoreño
- Apertura 2018: TBD

Club Deportivo San Sebastian is a Salvadoran professional football club based in San Sebastián Salitrillo, Santa Ana, El Salvador.

The club currently plays in the Tercera Division de Fútbol Salvadoreño.

The club was founded in TBD.

== Honours ==
- TBD

== Captain ==
- TBD (2016)

== Notable players ==
- (El Salvador)

== List of coaches ==
- (El Salvador) Mario Salguero
