= A.D. Masahuat =

Salvadoran football club

- Full name: Asociación Deportivas Masahuat
- Founded: 2021
- Ground: Esatdio Municipal Masahuat; Masahuat, Santa Ana, El Salvador
- Manager: (El Salvador) Rafael Tobar
- League: Tercera Division de Fútbol Salvadoreño
Home colours

Asociación Deportivas Masahuat is a Salvadoran professional football club based in Masahuat, Santa Ana, El Salvador.

The club currently plays in the Tercera Division de Fútbol Salvadoreño after being relegated from the Segunda Division.

== Honours ==
=== Domestic honours ===
==== Leagues ====
- Tercera División de Fútbol Salvadoreño and predecessors
  - Champions (1) : Clausura 2022
  - Play-off winner (2):
- La Asociación Departamental de Fútbol Aficionado' and predecessors (4th tier)
  - Champions (1):
  - Play-off winner (2):

== Current squad ==
- TBD

== List of coaches ==
- (El Salvador)
- (El Salvador) Camilo Cáceres
- (El Salvador) TBD (December 2023-Present)
