= Benji Villalobos =

Salvadoran professional goalkeeper (born 1988)

Personal information
- Full name: Benji Oldai Villalobos Segovia
- Date of birth: 15 July 1988 (age 38)
- Place of birth: El Tránsito, El Salvador
- Height: 1.81 m (5 ft 11 in)
- Position: Goalkeeper

Team information
- Current team: C.D. Águila
- Number: 22

Senior career*
| Years | Team | Apps | (Gls) |
| 2004 | CD UDET | | |
| 2005 | Universidad Gerardo Barrios | | |
| 2006– | CD Águila | 400 | (1) |

International career
| 2010– | El Salvador | 19 | (0) |
- * Club domestic league appearances and goals

Benji Oldai Villalobos Segovia (born 15 July 1988 in El Salvador) is a Salvadoran professional goalkeeper.

== Club career ==
=== UDET ===
After starting his career at UDET in 2004.

=== Universidad Gerardo Barrios ===
Villalobos played for Segunda División club Universidad Gerardo Barrios in 2005, before joining Águila in 2006.

=== Águila ===
Although Villalobos had been signed to Águila since 2006, he did not get any game time until 2 May 2008, in a league match against Alianza. Although Águila lost that game 2–1, Villalobos did very well and proved that he had a lot of potential.

On 15 September 2012, he scored a penalty kick against Isidro Metapán in a 2–3 defeat.

On 22 December 2009, Águila reached the Apertura 2009 final against FAS, but lost 2–3, Villalobos did not play.

In the next tournament, Águila reached the final again, but lost against Isidro Metapán 1–3, Villalobos did not play.

On 6 May 2012, Águila won the Clausura 2012 final against Isidro Metapán (2–1 victory), Villalobos was in goal.

Águila reached the semi-finals of the Apertura 2012, but lost against Isidro Metapán 3–5 on aggregate.

Águila was two points away from relegation in the Clausura 2014.

In the next tournament reached a new final, but lost against Isidro Metapán on penalties, Villalobos was in goal.

Águila reached the Clausura 2016 final, but lost again local rivals Dragón 0–1, Villalobos was in goal.

On 1 December 2018, Águila reached the semi-finals of the Apertura 2018, after defeating Audaz 4–3 on aggregate. However, Águila was eliminated by Santa Tecla F.C. 2–5 on aggregate. In May 2019, Villalobos save two penalties at the Clausura 2019 final against Alianza F.C.

== Match-fixing ban ==
On 10 October 2013, Villalobos was banned for six months due to his involvement with match fixing.

== International career ==
Villalobos received his first call-up to the El Salvador national team for the 2010 FIFA World Cup qualification game against Suriname on 10 September 2008, but did not get any game time. He has since been selected numerous times, but only received his first full men's national team cap when he played in an international friendly against Guatemala in September 2010, which El Salvador lost two-nil.

He was a non-playing squad member at the 2009 CONCACAF Gold Cup. However, Villalobos returned to El Salvador national team in 2017.

== Honours ==
=== Player ===
==== Club ====
C.D. Águila

- Primera División
  - Champion (3): Clausura 2012, Clausura 2019, Apertura 2023
  - Runners-up: Apertura 2009, Clausura 2010, Apertura 2014, Clausura 2016
