= Alfonso Perla =

Salvadoran footballer (born 1982)

Personal information
- Full name: Alfonso Alberto Perla Fuentes
- Date of birth: 28 March 1982 (age 44)
- Place of birth: San Alejo, El Salvador
- Height: 1.65 m (5 ft 5 in)
- Position: Midfielder

Senior career*
Years	Team	Apps	(Gls)
2003–2005	Dragón		
2005	Águila		
2005–2011	Vista Hermosa	87	(0)

International career^{‡}
2006	El Salvador	1	(0)
- * Club domestic league appearances and goals as of 22 September 2011 ‡ National team caps and goals as of 10 December 2021

Alfonso Alberto Perla Fuentes (born 28 March 1982) is a Salvadoran professional football player, who most recently played for Vista Hermosa in the Primera División de Fútbol de El Salvador.

== Club career ==
Nicknamed el Ogro, Perla began his playing career with Dragón in 2003, before joining Águila for the 2005 Clausura. He had played for Vista Hermosa since 2005, but was put on the transfer list due to financial circumstances in June 2011 despite his contract still running for two years.

== See also ==
- Football in El Salvador
- List of football clubs in El Salvador
