= Real Pajonal =

Real Pajonal FC
- Full name: Real Pajonal Fútbol Club
- Founded: 2001
- Ground: Cancha Municipal San Antonio Pajonal; El Salvador
- Capacity: 1,000
- Manager: (El Salvador) Antonio García Prieto
- League: Tercera Division de Fútbol Salvadoreño
- Website: https://m.facebook.com/RealPajonalFc/
Home colours

Real Pajonal is a Salvadoran professional football club based in San Antonio Pajonal, Santa Ana Department, El Salvador.

The club currently plays in the Tercera Division de Fútbol Salvadoreño.

The club was founded in 2001.

== Honours ==
=== Leagues ===
- La Asociación Departamental de Fútbol Aficionado and predecessors (4th tier)
  - Champions (1): 2015

== Captain ==
- Rene Garcia (2018)

== List of coaches ==
- (El Salvador) Antonio Garcia Prieto
