= Escuela de Futbol Guazapa =

EF Guazapa
- Full name: Escuela de Futbol Guazapa
- Nickname(s): Los Potros
- Founded: 2012
- Ground: Complejo Deportivo Teofilo Simán Fesa, El Salvador
- League: Tercera Division de Fútbol Salvadoreño
- Apertura 2018: TBD
Home colours

Escuela de Futbol Guazapa is a Salvadoran professional football club based in Guazapa, El Salvador. It was founded in 2012.

The club currently plays in the Tercera Division de Fútbol Salvadoreño.

== Honours ==
- Apertura 2016

== Captain ==
- Joel Avilés (2016)

== List of coaches ==
- (El Salvador) Welman Salomón Reyes (2012)
- (El Salvador) Ulises Monge (2014)
