= C.D. Real Sociedad de Morazán =

- Full name: Clube Deportivo Real Sociedad de Morazán
- Founded: 1981
- Ground: Polideportivo Tierra de fuego, El Salvador
- Manager: Osmín Argueta
- League: Tercera División de Fútbol Salvadoreño
Home colours	Away colours

Club Deportivo Real Sociedad de Morazán is a Salvadoran professional football club based in Sociedad, Morazán Department, El Salvador.

The club currently plays in the Tercera Division de Fútbol Salvadoreño after purchasing a spot.

== Honours ==
=== Domestic honours ===
==== Leagues ====
- Tercera División de Fútbol Salvadoreño and predecessors
  - Champions (2) : N/A
  - Play-off winner (2):
- La Asociación Departamental de Fútbol Aficionado and predecessors (4th tier)
  - Champions (1): Morazon Department 2024–2025
  - Play-off winner (2): N/A

== Current squad ==
As of: August 2025 Note: Flags indicate national team as defined under FIFA eligibility rules; some limited exceptions apply. Players may hold more than one non-FIFA nationality.

No.	Pos.	Nation	Player
—		ESA	TBD
—		ESA	TBD
—		ESA	TBD
—		ESA	TBD
—		ESA	TBD
—		ESA	TBD
—		ESA	TBD
—		ESA	TBD
—		ESA	TBD

No.	Pos.	Nation	Player
—		ESA	TBD
—		ESA	TBD
—		ESA	TBD
—		ESA	TBD
—		ESA	TBD
—		ESA	TBD
—		ESA	TBD
—		ESA	TBD
—		ESA	TBD

== List of coaches ==
- (El Salvador) Marvin Blanco ( - Present)
