= C.D. Gerardo Barrios =

Association football club in El Salvador

- Full name: Club Deportivo Gerardo Barrios
- Nickname: Universitario
- Ground: Cancha La Merced, San Rafael Oriente, El Salvador
- Chairman: (El Salvador) Luis Alonso Vasquez Lopez
- Manager: (El Salvador) Ervin Loza
- League: (El Salvador) Segunda División de Fútbol Salvadoreño
| Home colours | Away colours |

Club Deportivo Gerardo Barrios is a Salvadoran professional football club based in San Rafael Oriente, El Salvador.

The club currently plays in the Segunda División de Fútbol Salvadoreño, after being promoted as the third best team of the Tercera Division de Fútbol Salvadoreño.

The club previously went by Universidad de Gerardo Barrios.

== Stadium ==
Gerardo Barrios plays its home games at Cancha La Mercad in San Rafael Oriente. However the club stated the Cancha La Mercad was too small to play in the primera division therefore they moved their games to the bigger Estadio Cesar Antonio Angulo.

- Cancha La Merced (−2019)
- Estadio Cesar Antonio Angulo (2019–)
- Cancha Municipal de San Rafael Oriente

== Honours ==
=== Domestic honours ===
- Segunda División Salvadorean and predecessors
- Champions (0) : TBD
- Tercera División Salvadorean and predecessors
  - Champions:(1) :2018
- Liga ADFAS and predecessors
  - Champions:(1) :2017

== Club Records ==
=== Top goalscorers ===
| No. | Player | period | Goals |
|---|---|---|---|
| | (El Salvador) TBD | TBD-TBD | TBD |
| | (El Salvador) TBD | TBD-TBD | TBD |
| | (El Salvador) TBD | TBD-TBD | TBD |
| | (El Salvador) TBD | TBD-TBD | TBD |
| | (El Salvador) TBD | TBD-TBD | TBD |
| | (El Salvador) TBD | TBD-TBD | TBD |
| | (El Salvador) TBD | TBD-TBD | TBD |
| | (El Salvador) TBD | TBD-TBD | TBD |
| | (El Salvador) TBD | TBD-TBD | TBD |
| | (El Salvador) TBD | TBD-TBD | TBD |
| 10 | (El Salvador) Rusvel Saravia | 2021–2022 | 16 |

Note: Players in bold text are still active with Gerardo Barrios

== Current squad ==
As of: October 2021 Note: Flags indicate national team as defined under FIFA eligibility rules; some limited exceptions apply. Players may hold more than one non-FIFA nationality.

| No. | Pos. | Nation | Player |
|---|---|---|---|
| 1 | GK | ESA | Juan Lemus |
| 2 | DF | ESA | Salvador Vega |
| 3 | DF | ESA | Esteban Quintanilla |
| 5 | MF | ESA | Roberto Hernandez |
| 7 | MF | ESA | Rene Martinez |
| 8 | MF | COL | Yohanny Fancy Mancilla |
| 9 | FW | BRA | Josielson Moraes |
| 10 | MF | ESA | Jose Ventura |
| 11 | FW | ESA | Rusvel Saravia |
| 12 | MF | ESA | Manfredi Sosa |
| 14 | | ESA | Wilson Chavez |

| No. | Pos. | Nation | Player |
|---|---|---|---|
| 15 | | ESA | Emmanuel Flores |
| 16 | | ESA | C. Diaz |
| 17 | | ESA | J.Avalos |
| 20 | DF | ESA | Joaquin Campos |
| 21 | DF | ESA | Edwin Jaimes |
| 22 | | ESA | J. Acevedo |
| 23 | | ESA | Marcial Maravilla |
| 24 | | ESA | Nelson Batres |
| 25 | GK | ESA | Jairo Rivas |
| 31 | MF | ESA | Daniel Castro |
| 32 | | ESA | Irvin Granados |
| 33 | | ESA | Cesar Carrillo |
| 34 | | ESA | Ever Medrano |

== Notable players ==
- (El Salvador) Benji Villalobos

== Non-playing staff ==
=== Coaching staff ===
| Name | Role |
|---|---|
| (El Salvador) Miguel Angel Aguilar Obando | Head coach |
| (El Salvador) Reynaldo Leon | Assistant Coach |
| (El Salvador) TBD | Physical |
| (El Salvador) Milton Alvarez | Goalkeeping coach |
| (El Salvador) TBD | Team Physician |
| (El Salvador) TBD | Utility |

== List of coaches ==
- (Uruguay) Carlos Reyes (2001)
- (El Salvador) Nelson Antonio Granados (2017)
- (El Salvador) Salvador Coreas Privado (2018)
- (El Salvador) Victor Fuentos (2018)
- (El Salvador) Efrain Solano (June 2019 – 2020)
- (El Salvador) Ervin Loza (2020–21)
- (El Salvador) Miguel Angel Aguilar Obando (Oct 2021-)
