= Atlético Verapaz =

Association football club in El Salvador

- Full name: Club Deportivo Atlético Verapaz
- Founded: 1970
- Ground: Mini Estadio de Verapaz; Verapaz, San Vincente, El Salvador
- Capacity: 5,000
- Manager: (Argentina) Carlos Alberto Sánchez
- League: (El Salvador) Tercera División
- Apertura 2024: 9º (Atlético Verapaz)
Home colours	Away colours

Club Deportivo Atlético Verapaz is a Salvadoran professional football club based in Verapaz, San Vincente, El Salvador.

The club currently plays in the Tercera Division de Fútbol Salvadoreño.

== Honours ==
=== Domestic honours ===
==== Leagues ====
- Tercera División de Fútbol Salvadoreño and predecessors
  - Champions (2) : N/A
  - Play-off winner (2):
- La Asociación Departamental de Fútbol Aficionado' and predecessors (4th tier)
  - Champions (1):
  - Play-off winner (2):

== Current squad ==
Note: Flags indicate national team as defined under FIFA eligibility rules; some limited exceptions apply. Players may hold more than one non-FIFA nationality.

No.	Pos.	Nation	Player
—		(El Salvador) SLV	Kevin Zetino
—		(El Salvador) SLV	Miguel Alejandro Baires
—		(El Salvador) SLV	Maycol Roque
—		(El Salvador) SLV	Josué Ramírez
—		(El Salvador) SLV	Aldair Argueta
—		(El Salvador) SLV	Johnasson Tizando
—		(El Salvador) SLV	Walter Bladimir
—		(El Salvador) SLV	Néstor Méndez
—		(El Salvador) SLV	Juan David Rivera
—		(El Salvador) SLV	Jorge Ramos
—		(El Salvador) SLV	Bryan Arévalo
—		(El Salvador) SLV	Kevin Domínguez
—		(El Salvador) SLV	Emmanuel Cerritos
—		(El Salvador) SLV	Germán Castro
—		(El Salvador) SLV	TBD

No.	Pos.	Nation	Player
—		(El Salvador) SLV	Aldair Martínez
—		(El Salvador) SLV	Kevin Villalta
—		(El Salvador) SLV	Kevin Rivas
—		(El Salvador) SLV	Esai Alvarado
—		(El Salvador) SLV	TBD
—		(El Salvador) SLV	TBD
—		(El Salvador) SLV	TBD

=== Players with dual citizenship ===
- (El Salvador) (United States) TBD

=== In ===
Note: Flags indicate national team as defined under FIFA eligibility rules; some limited exceptions apply. Players may hold more than one non-FIFA nationality.

No.	Pos.	Nation	Player
—		(El Salvador) SLV	TBD (From TBD)
—		(El Salvador) SLV	TBD (From TBD)
—		(El Salvador) SLV	TBD (From TBD)
—		(El Salvador) SLV	TBD (From TBD)

No.	Pos.	Nation	Player
—		(El Salvador) SLV	TBD (From TBD)
—		(El Salvador) SLV	TBD (From TBD)
—		(El Salvador) SLV	TBD (From TBD)

=== Out ===
Note: Flags indicate national team as defined under FIFA eligibility rules; some limited exceptions apply. Players may hold more than one non-FIFA nationality.

No.	Pos.	Nation	Player
—		(El Salvador) SLV	TBD (To TBD)
—		(El Salvador) SLV	TBD (To TBD)
—		(El Salvador) SLV	TBD (To TBD)
—		(El Salvador) SLV	TBD (To TBD)

No.	Pos.	Nation	Player
—		(El Salvador) SLV	TBD (To TBD)
—		(El Salvador) SLV	TBD (To TBD)
—		(El Salvador) SLV	TBD (To TBD)

== List of coaches ==
- (El Salvador)
- (El Salvador)
- (El Salvador) Alonso Águilar (December 2023-June 2024)
- (Argentina) Carlos Sánchez (June 2024-2025)
- (El Salvador) Amancio Matías Mendoza (August 2025 -Present)
