= San Lorenzo, San Vicente =

San Lorenzo
- Municipality
- Location in El Salvador
- Coordinates: 13°43′N 88°48′W
- Country: El Salvador
- Department: San Vicente Department
- Elevation: 1,962 ft (598 m)

San Lorenzo is a municipality in the San Vicente department of El Salvador.

== Sports ==
The local professional football club is named C.D. Atlético San Lorenzo and it currently plays in the Salvadoran Third Division.
