= C.D. La Herradura =

- Full name: Club Deportivo La Herradura
- Founded: 2017
- Ground: , El Salvador
- League: Tercera Division de Fútbol Salvadoreño

Club Deportivo La Herradura is a Salvadoran professional football club based in TBD, El Salvador.

The club currently plays in the Tercera Division de Fútbol Salvadoreño. The Club was founded in 2017 and purchased the spot of Leones de Occidente.
