= C.D. Liberal Ismael Rodríguez =

C.D. Liberal I.R
- Full name: Club Deportivo Liberal Ismael Rodríguez
- Ground: Cancha Municipal de San Rafael Oriente; San Rafael Oriente, El Salvador
- Manager: Esteban Melara
- League: Segunda División de Fútbol Salvadoreño
- Clausura 2012: Grupo Centro Oriente B, 9th
Home colours

Club Deportivo Liberal Ismael Rodríguez are a Salvadoran professional football club based in San Miguel, El Salvador.

The club at one time played in Second Division, then played in the Salvadoran Third Division. For 2020-21 season the club plays once again in the Second Division.
