= Atlético San Simón =

Association football club in El Salvador

- Full name: Atlético San Simón
- Nickname(s): Los Judíos, los Romanos,
- Founded: 1989
- Ground: Estadio Municipal de San Simón; San Simón, Morazán, El Salvador
- Capacity: 1000 personas
- Manager: Josue Daniel Orellana (DUEÑO DEL CLUB ) (El Salvador)
- League: Tercera Division
- Grupo Centro Oriente B, 4th
Home colours	Away colours

Atlético San Simón is a Salvadoran professional football club based in San Simón, Morazán, El Salvador.

The club currently plays in the Tercera Division de Fútbol Salvadoreño.

== Honours ==
=== Domestic honours ===
==== Leagues ====
- Tercera División de Fútbol Salvadoreño and predecessors
  - Champions (2) : N/A
  - Runner-up (1) : Apertura 2024
  - Play-off winner (2): N/A
- La Asociación Departamental de Fútbol Aficionado' and predecessors (4th tier)
  - Champions (1):
  - Play-off winner (2):

== Current squad ==
Note: Flags indicate national team as defined under FIFA eligibility rules; some limited exceptions apply. Players may hold more than one non-FIFA nationality.

No.	Pos.	Nation	Player
—		(El Salvador) SLV	Santos Álvarez
—		(El Salvador) SLV	Johnathan Majano
—		(El Salvador) SLV	Adilson Romero
—		(El Salvador) SLV	Selvín Ventura
—	FW	(El Salvador) SLV	Walter Alvarenga
—		(El Salvador) SLV	Marlon Chicas
—		(El Salvador) SLV	Gabriel Garay
—		(El Salvador) SLV	Brayan Chavarria
—		(El Salvador) SLV	Iván Sol
—		(El Salvador) SLV	Anderson Guzmán

No.	Pos.	Nation	Player
—		(El Salvador) SLV	Herberth Cruz
—		(El Salvador) SLV	Ismael Portillo
—		(El Salvador) SLV	Miguel Romero
—		(El Salvador) SLV	Alberto Cabrera
—	DF	(El Salvador) SLV	Paúl Cedillo
—	DF	(El Salvador) SLV	Pascual Miranda
—		(El Salvador) SLV	Aldair Guevara
—		(El Salvador) SLV	Bryan de la O
—		(El Salvador) SLV	Óscar Soriano
—		(El Salvador) SLV	
—		(El Salvador) SLV	
—		(El Salvador) SLV	
—		(El Salvador) SLV	

=== Players with dual citizenship ===
- (El Salvador) (United States) TBD

=== In ===
Note: Flags indicate national team as defined under FIFA eligibility rules; some limited exceptions apply. Players may hold more than one non-FIFA nationality.

No.	Pos.	Nation	Player
—		(El Salvador) SLV	Alberto Cabrera (From TBD)
—		(El Salvador) SLV	Walter Alvarenga (From CD Supremo)
—		(El Salvador) SLV	Pascual Miranda (From CD Supremo)
—		(El Salvador) SLV	Aldair Guevara (From Real San Francisco)

No.	Pos.	Nation	Player
—		(El Salvador) SLV	Bryan de la O (From San Miguel FC)
—		(El Salvador) SLV	Oscar Soriano (From Cachuatique)
—		(El Salvador) SLV	TBD (From TBD)

=== Out ===
Note: Flags indicate national team as defined under FIFA eligibility rules; some limited exceptions apply. Players may hold more than one non-FIFA nationality.

No.	Pos.	Nation	Player
—		(El Salvador) SLV	Luis Gabriel Sorto (To Vista Hermosa)
—		(El Salvador) SLV	TBD (To TBD)
—		(El Salvador) SLV	TBD (To TBD)
—		(El Salvador) SLV	TBD (To TBD)

No.	Pos.	Nation	Player
—		(El Salvador) SLV	TBD (To TBD)
—		(El Salvador) SLV	TBD (To TBD)
—		(El Salvador) SLV	TBD (To TBD)

== List of coaches ==
- (El Salvador) Dagoberto Sosa (June 2021-September 2021)
- (El Salvador) Ciro Romero (July 2022-December 2022)
- (El Salvador) Rolando Pérez (January 2023-)
- (El Salvador) Ciro Romero (July 2023-)
- (El Salvador) TBD
