= C.D. San Pedro Masahuat =

- Full name: Club Deportivo San Pedro Masahuat
- Ground: Cancha Ing.José Luis Alvarenga
- Manager: Carlos Padilla
- League: Tercera Division de Fútbol Salvadoreño
- Clausura 2012: Grupo Centro Occidente B, 5th

Club Deportivo San Pedro Masahuat is a Salvadoran professional football club based in San Pedro Masahuat, La Paz, El Salvador.

The club currently plays in the Tercera Division de Fútbol Salvadoreño.
