= C.D. Atlético San Lorenzo =

- Full name: Club Deportivo Atlético San Lorenzo
- Founded: 1938
- Ground: Cancha Antonio Ponce, San Lorenzo, El Salvador
- League: Tercera Division de Fútbol Salvadoreño
- Clausura 2012: Grupo Centro Oriente A, 4th

Club Deportivo Atlético San Lorenzo is a Salvadoran professional football club based in San Lorenzo, San Vicente, El Salvador.

The club currently plays in the Tercera Division de Fútbol Salvadoreño.

== List of coaches ==
- (El Salvador) Edgardo Flores (2018)
- (El Salvador) Alonzo Aguilar (July 2021-Present)
