= S.I.D. Municipal =

SID Municipal
- Full name: SID Municipal
- Nickname(s): TBD
- Founded: 1965
- Ground: Estadio Municipal Siriaco Guevara, El Salvador
- League: Tercera Division de Fútbol Salvadoreño
- Apertura 2018: TBD

SID Municipal is a Salvadoran professional football club based in Santa Isabel Ishuatán, El Salvador.

The club currently plays in the Tercera Division de Fútbol Salvadoreño.

The club was founded in 1965.

== Honours ==
=== Domestic honours ===
==== Leagues ====
- Tercera División Salvadorean and predecessors
  - Champions (2) : N/A
  - Play-off winner (2):
- La Asociación Departamental de Fútbol Aficionado' and predecessors (4th tier)
  - Champions (1): Sonsonate Department 2015–2016
  - Play-off winner (2):
