= C.D. Atlético San José =

- Full name: Club Deportivo Atlético San José
- Ground: La Palma, El Salvador
- Manager: Ignacio Cartagena
Home colours

Club Deportivo Atlético San José is a Salvadoran professional football club based in La Palma, El Salvador.

== History ==
In summer 2010, Atlético San José became the first team from La Palma in history to play in the Salvadoran Third Division.

== Coaches ==
- (El Salvador) Ignacio Cartagena
