= EFI Mario Calvo =

Association football club in El Salvador

- Full name: Escuela de Futból de Izalco Mario Calvo
- Ground: Estadio Salvador Mariona; Izalco, Sonsonate Department, El Salvador
- Manager: (El Salvador) Nelson Boteo
- League: Tercera Division de Fútbol Salvadoreño
- Clausura 2012: Grupo Centro Oriente A, 4th
Home colours	Away colours

Escuela de Futból de Izalco Mario Calvo is a Salvadoran professional football club based in Izalco, Sonsonate Department, El Salvador.

The club currently plays in the Tercera Division de Fútbol Salvadoreño.

== Honours ==
=== Domestic honours ===
==== Leagues ====
- Tercera División de Fútbol Salvadoreño and predecessors
  - Champions (2) : N/A
  - Play-off winner (2):
- La Asociación Departamental de Fútbol Aficionado' and predecessors (4th tier)
  - Champions - Sonsonate Department (1) : 2022–23
  - Play-off winner (2):

== Current squad ==
Note: Flags indicate national team as defined under FIFA eligibility rules; some limited exceptions apply. Players may hold more than one non-FIFA nationality.

No.	Pos.	Nation	Player
—		SLV	
—		SLV	
—		SLV	

No.	Pos.	Nation	Player
—		SLV	
—		SLV	
—		SLV	

== List of coaches ==
- (El Salvador) Nelson Boteo
