= Quezaltepeque, El Salvador =

Quezaltepeque
- District
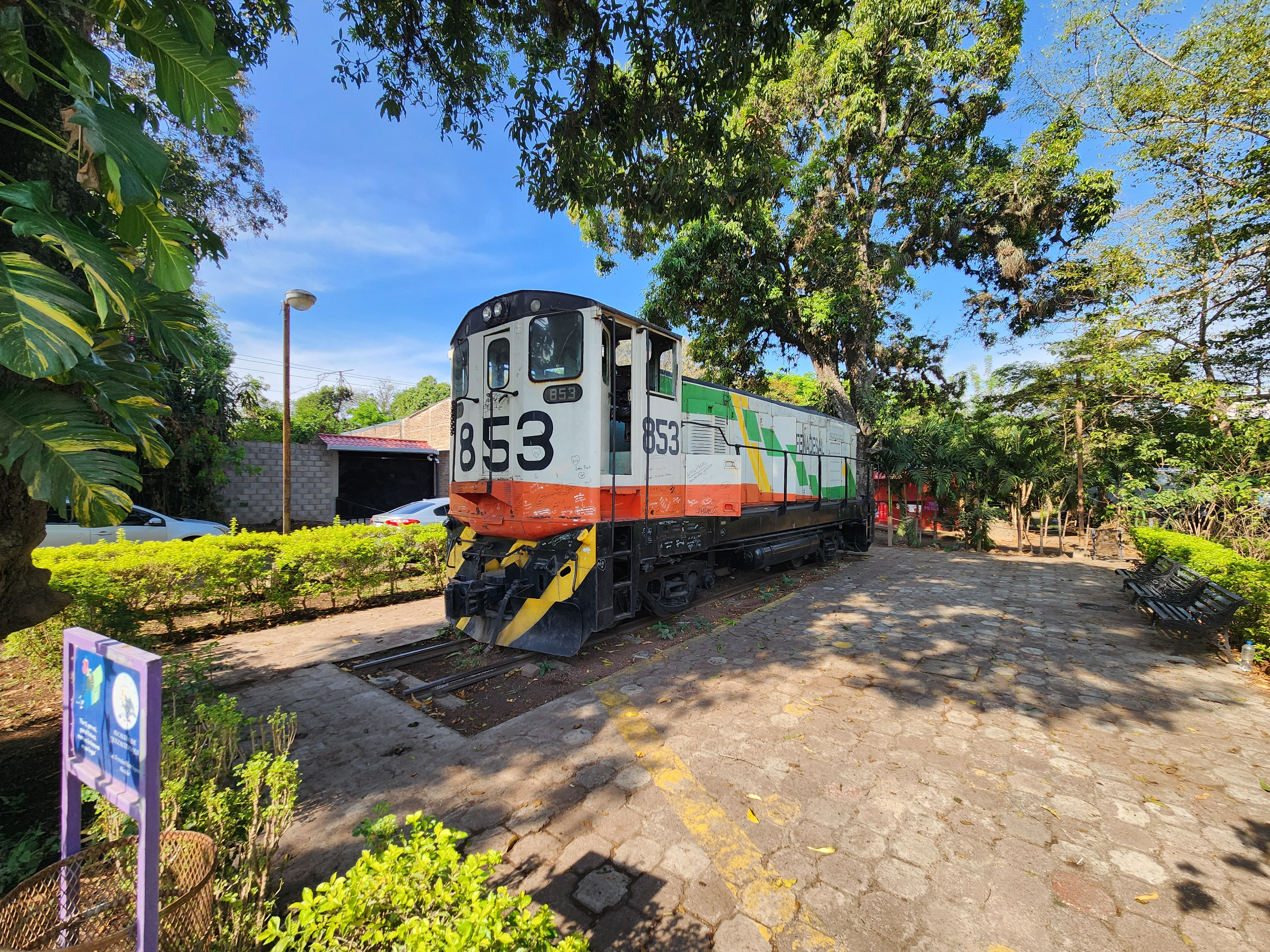
- Locomotive Museum in Quezaltepeque

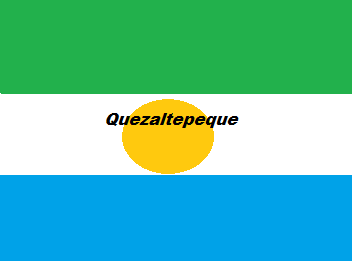
- Flag

- Location in El Salvador
- Coordinates: 13°50′N 89°16′W
- Country: El Salvador
- Department: La Libertad
- Elevation: 1,401 ft (427 m)

Population (2024)
  - District: 62,572
  - Estimate (2026): 65,721
  - Rank: 23rd in El Salvador
  - Urban: 53,456
  - Rural: 9,116

Quezaltepeque is a municipality in the La Libertad department of El Salvador.

It is located about 15 km from San Salvador.

The word Quezaltepeque is a Nahuat word meaning "hills of quetzal." A quetzal is a bird that used to live around the area of Quezaltepeque. High levels of deforestation forced the bird to migrate to other areas.

== People ==
- Darwin Cerén (born 1989), Salvadoran footballer who plays for C.D Águilla and the El Salvador national football team
- Óscar Cerén (born 26 October 1991) is a Salvadoran professional footballer who plays as a midfielder for Primera División club Isidro Metapán and the El Salvador national team.
- Manuel Flores Cornejo (born 1965), Farabundo Martí National Liberation Front (FMLN) 2024 presidential candidate
- Alfonso Quijada Urías (born 1940), poet
- Salvador Sánchez Cerén (born 1944), president of El Salvador (2014–2019)

== Sports ==
The local football club is named Juventud Alegre F.C. and it currently plays in the Salvadoran Third Division. It's also home to the Autódromo Internacional El Jabalí.
