= AS Atlas F.C. =

Association football club in El Salvador

- Full name: AS Atlas Futbol Clube
- Founded: 1942
- Ground: Estadio Borja Castillo, San Rafael Obrajuelo, El Salvador
- Chairman: (El Salvador) Jaime Jimenez
- Manager: (Colombia) Duvan Etcheverri
- League: ADFA La Paz
- Apertura 2024: TBD

AS Atlas Futbol Clube is a Salvadoran professional football club based in Santiago Nonualco, La Paz, El Salvador.

The club sold their spot in the Tercera Division de Fútbol Salvadoreño to Zacatecoluca F.C. in June 2023. The club currently plays in ADFA La Paz, which is the fourth tier of El Salvador football system.

The club was founded in 1942

== Honours ==
=== Domestic honours ===
==== Leagues ====
- Tercera División Salvadorean and predecessors
  - Champions (1) : 1978
  - Play-off winner (2):
- La Asociación Departamental de Fútbol Aficionado' and predecessors (4th tier)
  - Champions (1): La Paz Department 2023–2024
  - Play-off winner (2):

=== Captains ===
Years	Captain
TBD	(El Salvador) TBD (FW)
TBD	(El Salvador) TBD (FW)
2021	(El Salvador) David Chorro (FW)
2024-Present	(El Salvador) Mauricio Climaco (FW)

== List of coaches ==
- (Argentina) Gabriel Alvarez (August 2020 - April 2023) coached 102 games
- (El Salvador) Miguel Soriano (April 2023- June 2023)
- (Colombia) Duvan Etcheverri (July 2023 -Present)
