= Sonics International Club =

CD Sonics
- Full name: Club Deportivo Sonics International Club
- Founded: 2017
- Ground: , El Salvador
- Manager: (El Salvador) Douglas Flores
- League: Tercera División Salvadorean
Home colours

Club Deportivo Sonics International Club is a Salvadoran football club based in Sonsonate, Sonsonate Department, El Salvador.

The club currently plays in the Tercera Division de Fútbol Salvadoreño after purchasing a spot.

== Honours ==
=== Domestic honours ===
==== Leagues ====
- Tercera División Salvadorean and predecessors
  - Champions (2) : N/A
  - Play-off winner (2):
- La Asociación Departamental de Fútbol Aficionado and predecessors (4th tier)
  - Champions (1): N/A
  - Play-off winner (2):

== Current squad ==
As of: July 2025 Note: Flags indicate national team as defined under FIFA eligibility rules; some limited exceptions apply. Players may hold more than one non-FIFA nationality.

No.	Pos.	Nation	Player
—	DF	SLV	Angel Santos
—	FW	SLV	Enrique Fonseca
—	MF	SLV	Luis Granados
—	MF	SLV	Fernando Cardona
—	MF	SLV	Javier Portillo
—	MF	SLV	Fernando Perez
—	MF	SLV	Howell Guerra
—	GK	SLV	Oscar Garcia
—	MF	SLV	Esteban Rivera
—	DF	SLV	Noe Campos
—	DF	SLV	Gerardi Aguilar
—	MF	SLV	Kevin Aguilar
—	MF	SLV	Denis Martinez
—	FW	SLV	Jason Diaz
—	GK	SLV	Ronald Alvarado

No.	Pos.	Nation	Player
—	MF	SLV	Josue Blanco
—	DF	SLV	Cristian Rivera
—	DF	SLV	Anderson Tesorero
—	DF	SLV	Josue Melara
—	MF	SLV	Rodrigo Cuellar
—	DF	SLV	Mijail Delgado
—	FW	SLV	Joel Pineda
—	DF	SLV	Josue Rivera
—		SLV	TBD
—		SLV	TBD

=== Players with dual citizenship ===
- (United States) TBD

=== In ===
Note: Flags indicate national team as defined under FIFA eligibility rules; some limited exceptions apply. Players may hold more than one non-FIFA nationality.

No.	Pos.	Nation	Player
—	MF	SLV	Javier Portillo (From INCA)
—	MF	SLV	Howell Guerra (From Santa Ana Municipal)
—		SLV	Fernando Perez (From Isidro Metapan Reserva)

No.	Pos.	Nation	Player
—		SLV	TBD (From Free agent)
—		SLV	TBD (From Free agent)
—		SLV	TBD (From Free agent)

=== Out ===
Note: Flags indicate national team as defined under FIFA eligibility rules; some limited exceptions apply. Players may hold more than one non-FIFA nationality.

No.	Pos.	Nation	Player
—		SLV	TBD (To TBD)
—		SLV	TBD (To TBD)
—		SLV	TBD (To TBD)

No.	Pos.	Nation	Player
—		SLV	TBD (To TBD)

== List of coaches ==
- (El Salvador) Ennio Mendoza

== Records ==
- Record League victory: vs TBD, 2024
- Largest Home victory, Primera División: 5-1 v TBD, Day Month Year
- Largest Away victory, Primera División: 3-0 v TBD, Day Month Year
- Largest Home loss, Primera División: 1–3 v TBD, Day Month Year
- Largest Away loss, Primera División: 1-4 v TBD, Day Month Year
- Highest average attendance, season: 49,176, Primera División
- Most goals scored, season, Primera División: 25, TBD
- Worst season: Segunda Division 2002-2003: 1 win, 4 draws and 17 losses (7 points)
- Record Cup Victory5-1 v TBD, Day Month Year
- Record Cup Defeat: 1–3 v TBD, Day Month Year
- Most successive victories TBD matches (from 26 December 1999 to 7 March 2000)
- Most games without a win TBD matches (from 18 October 2008 to 13 January 2009)
- Most successive defeats TBD matches (from 11 April 1990 to 15 September 1990)
- Most successive draws TBD matches (from 13 December 1992 to 16 January 1993)
- Longest unbeaten TBD matches (from 4 October 1980 to 20 December 1980)
- Record home attendance 3,000 vs TBD, League Seasom, Day Month Year
- Record lowest home attendance 340 vs TBD, Day Month Year
- Record league attendance 68,160 vs TBD, Day Month Year

=== Individual records ===
- Record appearances (all competitions):
- Record appearances (Primera Division):
- Most goals in a season (all competitions): TBD (168)
- Most hat-tricks (all competitions):
- Most international caps player for Sal Y Mar: 00 (0 whilst at Sal Y Mar), TBD
- Most international caps for El Salvador while a Sal Y Mar player:
- Most goals scored by one player: 7, TBD vs TBD, 2024
- Oldest player: TBD (36 years and 239 days)
- Youngest player: TBD (15 years and 00 days) [1]
- Oldest scorer: Nicolas Munoz (36 years and 239 days)
- Youngest scorer: TBD (16 years and 310 days)
- Quickest scorer: TBD (9 seconds)
- Quickest sending off: TBD (3 minutes)
