= El Tránsito =

- Municipality
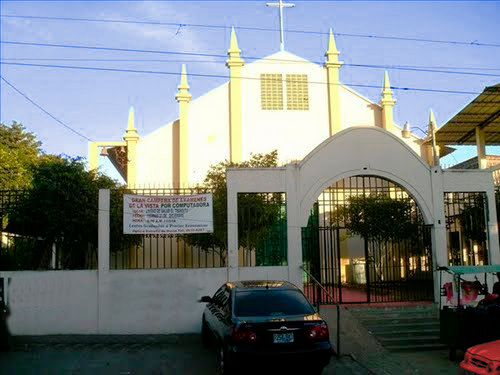

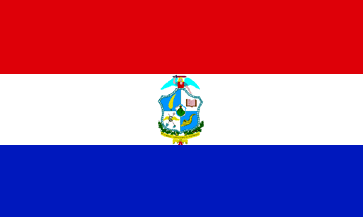
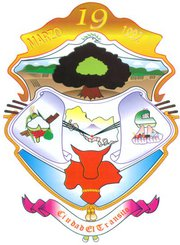
- Flag Seal

- Location in El Salvador
- Coordinates: 13°21′N 88°21′W
- Country: El Salvador
- Department: San Miguel Department
- Elevation: 325 ft (99 m)

Population
  - Total: 26,987

El Tránsito is a municipality in the department of San Miguel, El Salvador. According to the official census of 2016, it has a population of 21,093 inhabitants. It limits the north with the municipality of San Rafael Oriente; to the east with the municipality of San Miguel and the lagoon of El Jocotal; to the southeast with the municipality of Jucuarán; to the southwest with the municipality of Concepción Batres; and to the west with the municipality of Ereguayquín.

== Sports ==
The local professional football club is named C.D. UDET and it currently plays in the Salvadoran Third Division. Also there were 2 other football teams these are: C.D. San Carlos and C.D. Palucho.
