= Nonualco F.C. =

Association football club in El Salvador

- Full name: Nonualco Futbol Clube
- Ground: Complejo Deportivo Santa Maria Ostum, El Salvador
- League: Tercera División Salvadorean
Home colours	Away colours

Nonualco Futbol Clube is a Salvadoran professional football club based in San Pedro Nonualco, La Paz Department, El Salvador.

The club currently plays in the Tercera Division de Fútbol Salvadoreño after purchasing a spot.

== Honours ==
=== Domestic honours ===
==== Leagues ====
- Tercera División Salvadorean and predecessors
  - Champions (2) : N/A
  - Play-off winner (2):
- La Asociación Departamental de Fútbol Aficionado and predecessors (4th tier)
  - Champions (1): La Paz Department 2024–2025
  - Play-off winner (2): 2024-2025 (Central)

== Current squad ==
As of: July 2025 Note: Flags indicate national team as defined under FIFA eligibility rules; some limited exceptions apply. Players may hold more than one non-FIFA nationality.

No.	Pos.	Nation	Player
7		SLV	Rodrigo Zetino
1		SLV	Adonis Hernández
4		SLV	Manuel Muñoz
3		SLV	Jonathan Ramírez
8		SLV	Geovany Ponce
15		SLV	César Sánchez
21		SLV	Juan Beltrán
12		SLV	Balmore Sánchez
2		SLV	Darién Palacios
10		SLV	Edgardo Orellana
9		SLV	Cristian Hernández

No.	Pos.	Nation	Player
11		SLV	Hilario Aguilar
16		SLV	Josué Jiménez
17		SLV	Iker Bolaños
19		SLV	Ronald Guzmán
20		SLV	Aaron Díaz
22		SLV	Luis Rivas
23		SLV	Ángel Molina
24		SLV	Lennin Molina
25		SLV	Diego Cortéz
26		SLV	Edwin Nieto

== List of coaches ==
- (El Salvador) Marlon Gómez ( - Present)
