= A.D. Puerto El Triunfo =

Salvadoran football club

- Full name: Asociación Deportiva Puerto El Triunfo
- Ground: Cancha Mar y Plata , El Salvador
- Chairman: Alexander Torres
- League: Tercera División Salvadorean
Home colours

Asociación Deportiva Puerto El Triunfo is a Salvadoran football club based in Puerto El Triunfo, Usulutan, El Salvador.

The club currently plays in the Tercera Division de Fútbol Salvadoreño after purchasing a spot.

== Honours ==
=== Domestic honours ===
==== Leagues ====
- Tercera División Salvadorean and predecessors
  - Champions (2) : N/A
  - Play-off winner (2):
- La Asociación Departamental de Fútbol Aficionado and predecessors (4th tier)
  - Champions (1): Usulutan Department 2023–2024
  - Play-off winner (2):

== Current squad ==
As of: February 2024 Note: Flags indicate national team as defined under FIFA eligibility rules; some limited exceptions apply. Players may hold more than one non-FIFA nationality.

No.	Pos.	Nation	Player
—		SLV	David Paiz
—		SLV	Mario Sanchez
—		SLV	TBD
—		SLV	TBD
—		SLV	TBD

No.	Pos.	Nation	Player
—		SLV	TBD
—		SLV	TBD
—		SLV	TBD
—		SLV	TBD
—		SLV	TBD

== List of coaches ==
- (El Salvador) TBD
