= C.D. TACA =

Salvadoran football club

- Full name: Club Deportivo TACA
- Ground: Cancha Municipal, Oratorio de Concepción, El Salvador
- League: Tercera Division de Fútbol Salvadoreño
- Clausura 2012: Grupo Centro Occidente B, 7th

Club Deportivo TACA is a Salvadoran professional football club based in Oratorio de Concepción, Cuscatlán, El Salvador.

The club currently plays in the Tercera Division de Fútbol Salvadoreño.

== Former coaches ==
- (El Salvador) Alberto Valle (2005)
