= Chirilagua =

- Nickname: Rio de las Tres Estrellas
- Location in El Salvador
- Coordinates: 13°13′0″N 88°8′19″W
- Country: El Salvador
- Department: San Miguel
- Ciudad de Chirilagua: April 29, 1901

Area
  - City: 79.9 sq mi (206.9 km^{2})
  - Urban: 1.5 sq mi (3.9 km^{2})
- Elevation: 1,050 ft (320 m)

Population (2024 census)
  - City: 19,368

Chirilagua is a municipality in southeastern El Salvador, in the department of San Miguel.

It contains approximately 24,000 inhabitants as a result of census of 2007. The town is located on a mountain plateau adjacent to the Pacific Ocean. There is a lot to do at this town; from eating traditional food, to playing soccer in La plaza or the soccer fields, to just getting a snow cone and walking around. “ La Plaza “ which is a center of the town where there are many food places, a turf field, shopping center, grocery store playground, and basketball court. There are many types of religions in this town but the most popular one is Catholicism. The main Catholic church is located in the middle of the town beside “ La Plaza”. As traditions, every December 12 the Catholic community gets together to celebrate the Virgin Mary.

== Sports ==
The local football club is named Club Deportivo Estrellas del Sur and it currently plays in the Salvadoran Third Division.
