= La Hachadura F.C. =

Association football club in El Salvador

- Full name: La Hachadura Futbol Clube
- Founded: 2021
- Ground: Cancha INDES, Cara Sucia , El Salvador
- Manager: (El Salvador) Carlos Alvarenga
- League: Tercera División Salvadorean
Home colours	Away colours

La Hachadura Futbol Clube is a Salvadoran professional football club based in La Hachadura, Sonsonate Department, El Salvador.

The club currently plays in the Tercera Division de Fútbol Salvadoreño after purchasing a spot.

== Honours ==
=== Domestic honours ===
==== Leagues ====
- Tercera División Salvadorean and predecessors
  - Champions (2) : N/A
  - Play-off winner (2):
- La Asociación Departamental de Fútbol Aficionado and predecessors (4th tier)
  - Champions (1): Sonsonate Department 2024–2025
  - Play-off winner (2): N/A

== Current squad ==
As of: August 2025 Note: Flags indicate national team as defined under FIFA eligibility rules; some limited exceptions apply. Players may hold more than one non-FIFA nationality.

No.	Pos.	Nation	Player
1	GK	SLV	Jonathan Hernandez
4	DF	SLV	Esteban Aleman
5	MF	SLV	Jose Escobar
6	DF	SLV	Argenis Capacho
7	FW	SLV	Eduardo Ayala
9	FW	SLV	Fredy Guzman
10	MF	SLV	Elian Mejia
11	DF	SLV	Brayan Hernandez
12	FW	SLV	Raul Ernesto Rosa
14	DF	SLV	Yonatan Arana
15	DF	SLV	Iverson Garcia
16		SLV	Juan carlos Lopez
17	FW	SLV	Roberto Lopez
19		SLV	Marcos hernandez

No.	Pos.	Nation	Player
20	MF	SLV	Francisco Trujillo
21	DF	SLV	Arturo Umana
22	MF	SLV	Alessandro Capacho
24	MF	SLV	Giovanni Medina
23	MF	SLV	Erick Aragon
25		SLV	Mario Paredes
26		SLV	Andy Salguero
28	MF	SLV	Eduardo Cerritos
—	DF	SLV	Maynor Moya

== List of coaches ==
- (El Salvador) Rene Gutierrez
- (El Salvador) Rafael Rizo
- (El Salvador) Carlos Alvarenga
