= Racing de Gualuca =

Association football club in El Salvador

Racing F.C. Gualuca
- Full name: Racing Futbol Clube de Gualuca
- Ground: Cancha Gualuca , El Salvador
- Chairman: (El Salvador) Ruben Chacon
- Manager: (El Salvador) Ramon Velasquez
- League: Tercera División Salvadorean
Home colours	Away colours

Racing Futbol Clube de Gualuca is a Salvadoran professional football club based in Soyapango, San Miguel Department, El Salvador.

The club currently plays in the Tercera Division de Fútbol Salvadoreño after purchasing a spot.

== Honours ==
=== Domestic honours ===
==== Leagues ====
- Tercera División Salvadorean and predecessors
  - Champions (2) : Apertura 2025 (Centro Oriente)
  - Play-off winner (2):
- La Asociación Departamental de Fútbol Aficionado and predecessors (4th tier)
  - Champions (1): San Miguel Department 2024–2025
  - Play-off winner (2): 2025-2025 (Oriente)

== Current squad ==
As of: July 2025 Note: Flags indicate national team as defined under FIFA eligibility rules; some limited exceptions apply. Players may hold more than one non-FIFA nationality.

No.	Pos.	Nation	Player
—		SLV	Alvaro Lizama
—		SLV	Medina
—		SLV	TBD
—		SLV	TBD
—		SLV	TBD
—		SLV	TBD
—		SLV	TBD
—		SLV	TBD
—		SLV	TBD
—		SLV	TBD

No.	Pos.	Nation	Player
—		SLV	TBD
—		SLV	TBD
—		SLV	TBD
—		SLV	TBD
—		SLV	TBD
—		SLV	TBD
—		SLV	TBD
—		SLV	TBD
—		SLV	TBD

=== Players with dual citizenship ===
- (El Salvador) (United States) TBD

=== In ===
Note: Flags indicate national team as defined under FIFA eligibility rules; some limited exceptions apply. Players may hold more than one non-FIFA nationality.

No.	Pos.	Nation	Player
—		SLV	TBD (From TBD)
—		SLV	TBD (From TBD)
—		SLV	TBD (From TBD)
—		SLV	TBD (From TBD)

No.	Pos.	Nation	Player
—		SLV	TBD (From TBD)
—		SLV	TBD (From TBD)
—		SLV	TBD (From TBD)

=== Out ===
Note: Flags indicate national team as defined under FIFA eligibility rules; some limited exceptions apply. Players may hold more than one non-FIFA nationality.

No.	Pos.	Nation	Player
—		SLV	TBD (To TBD)
—		SLV	TBD (To TBD)
—		SLV	TBD (To TBD)
—		SLV	TBD (To TBD)

No.	Pos.	Nation	Player
—		SLV	TBD (To TBD)
—		SLV	TBD (To TBD)
—		SLV	TBD (To TBD)

== List of notable players ==
- (El Salvador) Diego Coca (2026 - Present)

== List of coaches ==
- (El Salvador) Ramon Velasquez (January 2024 - 2024)
- (El Salvador) Ervin Loza (2025-December 2025)
- (El Salvador) Miguel Ayala (January 2026 - Present)
