= Buenos Aires F.C. =

- Full name: Buenos Aires Futbol Clube
- Ground: Cancha Cristobal Aleman Alas , El Salvador
- League: Tercera División Salvadorean
Home colours

Buenos Aires Futbol Clube is a Salvadoran football club based in Acajutla, Sonsonate Department, El Salvador.

The club currently plays in the Tercera Division de Fútbol Salvadoreño after purchasing a spot.

== Honours ==
=== Domestic honours ===
==== Leagues ====
- Tercera División Salvadorean and predecessors
  - Champions (2) : N/A
  - Runner-up (1) : Apertura 2024
  - Play-off winner (2): N/A
- La Asociación Departamental de Fútbol Aficionado' and predecessors (4th tier)
  - Champions (1): Sonsonate Department 2023–2024
  - Play-off winner (2):

== Current squad ==
As of: December 2024 Note: Flags indicate national team as defined under FIFA eligibility rules; some limited exceptions apply. Players may hold more than one non-FIFA nationality.

No.	Pos.	Nation	Player
1	GK	SLV	Jonathan Espinoza
2		SLV	Frank Martinez
4		SLV	Cesar Osorio
11		SLV	Fredy Guzman
14		SLV	Bryan Escobar
17		SLV	Marvin Rodas
20		SLV	Ulises Alfaro

No.	Pos.	Nation	Player
23		SLV	Bryan Castaneda
27		SLV	Marvin Durango
28		SLV	Martin Cortez
30		SLV	Juan Carlos Ayala
31		SLV	Miguel Perez
32		SLV	Gerson Gonzalez

=== Players with dual citizenship ===
- (El Salvador) (United States) TBD

=== In ===
Note: Flags indicate national team as defined under FIFA eligibility rules; some limited exceptions apply. Players may hold more than one non-FIFA nationality.

No.	Pos.	Nation	Player
—		SLV	TBD (From TBD)
—		SLV	TBD (From TBD)
—		SLV	TBD (From TBD)
—		SLV	TBD (From TBD)

No.	Pos.	Nation	Player
—		SLV	TBD (From TBD)
—		SLV	TBD (From TBD)
—		SLV	TBD (From TBD)

=== Out ===
Note: Flags indicate national team as defined under FIFA eligibility rules; some limited exceptions apply. Players may hold more than one non-FIFA nationality.

No.	Pos.	Nation	Player
—		SLV	TBD (To TBD)
—		SLV	TBD (To TBD)
—		SLV	TBD (To TBD)
—		SLV	TBD (To TBD)

No.	Pos.	Nation	Player
—		SLV	TBD (To TBD)
—		SLV	TBD (To TBD)
—		SLV	TBD (To TBD)

== Personnel ==
=== Current technical staff ===
As of August, 2025

Position	Name
Manager	(El Salvador) Andres Navarro
Assistant manager	(El Salvador) Walter Mismit
Goalkeeping coach	(El Salvador) Nestor Carias
Fitness coach	(El Salvador) Carlos Contreras
Club Doctor	(El Salvador) TBD
knesliogiocal	(El Salvador) TBD
Utility	(El Salvador) TBD

== List of coaches ==
- (El Salvador) William Mendoza
- (El Salvador) Ricardo Navarro (June 2025 - October 2025)
- (El Salvador) Walter Mismit (Interim) (October 2025 - Present)

== Records ==
- Record League victory: vs TBD, 2024
- Largest Home victory, Primera División: 5-1 v TBD, Day Month Year
- Largest Away victory, Primera División: 3-0 v TBD, Day Month Year
- Largest Home loss, Primera División: 1–3 v TBD, Day Month Year
- Largest Away loss, Primera División: 1-4 v TBD, Day Month Year
- Highest average attendance, season: 49,176, Primera División
- Most goals scored, season, Primera División: 25, TBD
- Worst season: Segunda Division 2002-2003: 1 win, 4 draws and 17 losses (7 points)
- Record Cup Victory5-1 v TBD, Day Month Year
- Record Cup Defeat: 1–3 v TBD, Day Month Year
- Most successive victories TBD matches (from 26 December 1999 to 7 March 2000)
- Most games without a win TBD matches (from 18 October 2008 to 13 January 2009)
- Most successive defeats TBD matches (from 11 April 1990 to 15 September 1990)
- Most successive draws TBD matches (from 13 December 1992 to 16 January 1993)
- Longest unbeaten TBD matches (from 4 October 1980 to 20 December 1980)
- Record home attendance 3,000 vs TBD, League Seasom, Day Month Year
- Record lowest home attendance 340 vs TBD, Day Month Year
- Record league attendance 68,160 vs TBD, Day Month Year

=== Individual records ===
- Record appearances (all competitions):
- Record appearances (Primera Division):
- Most goals in a season (all competitions): TBD (168)
- Most hat-tricks (all competitions):
- Most international caps player for Sal Y Mar: 00 (0 whilst at Sal Y Mar), TBD
- Most international caps for El Salvador while a Sal Y Mar player:
- Most goals scored by one player: 7, TBD vs TBD, 2024
- Oldest player: TBD (36 years and 239 days)
- Youngest player: TBD (15 years and 00 days) [1]
- Oldest scorer: Nicolas Munoz (36 years and 239 days)
- Youngest scorer: TBD (16 years and 310 days)
- Quickest scorer: TBD (9 seconds)
- Quickest sending off: TBD (3 minutes)
