= Leonel Guevara =

Salvadoran footballer (born 1983)

Personal information
- Full name: Leonel Arístides Guevara
- Date of birth: October 7, 1983 (age 43)
- Place of birth: San Alejo, El Salvador
- Height: 1.78 m (5 ft 10 in)
- Position: Defender

Senior career*
| Years | Team | Apps | (Gls) |
| 2000–2001 | Universidad Gerardo Barrios | | |
| 2002–2003 | UDET | | |
| 2003–2004, 2005 | Atlético Chaparrastique | | |
| 2005–2006 | Vista Hermosa | | |
| 2007–2011 | Águila | | |
| 2011 | UES | | |
| 2013 | Ciclón del Golfo | | |
| 2013–2014 | Dragón | | |
| 2014–2015 | Ciclón del Golfo | | |
| 2015–2016 | Dragón | | |
| 2016 | Fuerte San Francisco | | |

International career
| 2006–2007 | El Salvador | 5 | (0) |

Managerial career
- C.D. Atlas La Union
- * Club domestic league appearances and goals

Leonel Arístides Guevara (born October 7, 1983) is a Salvadoran former professional footballer who played as a defender.

== Club career ==
Guevara was born in San Alejo. He started his career with Salvadoran Second Division side Universidad Gerardo Barrios in 2002, before joining UDET in 2003 and Atlético Chaparrastique in the two years thereafter.

He made his debut at the highest level with Vista Hermosa before he moved to Águila in 2008.

He played for new team Ciclón del Golfo, for a whole season, before joining Dragón for the 2014 season.

== International career ==
Guevara made his debut for El Salvador in a November 2006 friendly match against Bolivia and has earned, as of December 2010, a total of 5 caps, scoring no goals.

He has represented his country at the 2007 CONCACAF Gold Cup.

His final international game was a June 2007 CONCACAF Gold Cup match against the United States.
