= Brasil F.C. =

- Full name: Brasil Fútbol Club
- Ground: Estadio Municipal Quelapa, El Salvador
- League: Tercera División Salvadorean
Home colours	Away colours

Brasil Fútbol Club is a Salvadoran football club based in Canton El Brazo, San Miguel Department, El Salvador.

The club currently plays in the Tercera Division de Fútbol Salvadoreño after purchasing a spot.

== Honours ==
=== Domestic honours ===
==== Leagues ====
- Tercera División Salvadorean and predecessors
  - Champions (2) : N/A
  - Play-off winner (2):
- La Asociación Departamental de Fútbol Aficionado' and predecessors (4th tier)
  - Champions (1): San Miguel Department 2023–2024
  - Play-off winner (2):

== Current squad ==
As of: February 2024 Note: Flags indicate national team as defined under FIFA eligibility rules; some limited exceptions apply. Players may hold more than one non-FIFA nationality.

No.	Pos.	Nation	Player
6		SLV	David Aldana
—		SLV	Bryan Merino
—		SLV	Wilber Hernández
—		SLV	Moris Martínez
—		SLV	Ever Pineda
—		SLV	Cristian Gómez

No.	Pos.	Nation	Player
—		SLV	Manuel Castro
—		SLV	Sebastian Zavala
—		SLV	Xavi Rivas
—		SLV	Arturo Castellanos
—		SLV	Quened Rodriguez

== List of coaches ==
- (El Salvador) TBD
- (El Salvador) Miguel Coto (June 2025 - Present)

== List of notable players ==
- (El Salvador) José Sigifredo Espinoza Bucky
