= A.D. Nacional Las Margaritas =

Association football club in El Salvador

- Full name: A.D. Nacional Las Margaritas
- Founded: 1988
- Ground: Cancha Las Margaritas , El Salvador
- Chairman: (El Salvador) José Olmedo
- Manager: (El Salvador) Osmaro Santos
- League: Tercera División Salvadorean
Home colours

A.D. Nacional Las Margaritas is a Salvadoran professional football club based in Soyapango, San Salvador Department, El Salvador.

The club currently plays in the Tercera Division de Fútbol Salvadoreño after purchasing a spot.

== Honours ==
=== Domestic honours ===
==== Leagues ====
- Tercera División Salvadorean and predecessors
  - Champions (2) : N/A
  - Play-off winner (2):
- La Asociación Departamental de Fútbol Aficionado and predecessors (4th tier)
  - Champions (1): San Salvador Department 2024–2025
  - Play-off winner (2): 2025-2025 (Central)

== Current squad ==
As of: July 2025 Note: Flags indicate national team as defined under FIFA eligibility rules; some limited exceptions apply. Players may hold more than one non-FIFA nationality.

No.	Pos.	Nation	Player
—		SLV	Moises Chiquillo
—		SLV	Ezequiel Menjivar
—		SLV	Cristobal Osorio
—		SLV	Luis Cruz
—		SLV	TBD
—		SLV	TBD
—		SLV	TBD
—		SLV	TBD
—		SLV	TBD
—		SLV	TBD

No.	Pos.	Nation	Player
—		SLV	TBD
—		SLV	TBD
—		SLV	TBD
—		SLV	TBD
—		SLV	TBD
—		SLV	TBD
—		SLV	TBD
—		SLV	TBD
—		SLV	TBD

=== Players with dual citizenship ===
- (El Salvador) (United States) TBD

=== In ===
Note: Flags indicate national team as defined under FIFA eligibility rules; some limited exceptions apply. Players may hold more than one non-FIFA nationality.

No.	Pos.	Nation	Player
—		SLV	TBD (From TBD)
—		SLV	TBD (From TBD)
—		SLV	TBD (From TBD)
—		SLV	TBD (From TBD)

No.	Pos.	Nation	Player
—		SLV	TBD (From TBD)
—		SLV	TBD (From TBD)
—		SLV	TBD (From TBD)

=== Out ===
Note: Flags indicate national team as defined under FIFA eligibility rules; some limited exceptions apply. Players may hold more than one non-FIFA nationality.

No.	Pos.	Nation	Player
—		SLV	TBD (To TBD)
—		SLV	TBD (To TBD)
—		SLV	TBD (To TBD)
—		SLV	TBD (To TBD)

No.	Pos.	Nation	Player
—		SLV	TBD (To TBD)
—		SLV	TBD (To TBD)
—		SLV	TBD (To TBD)

== List of coaches ==
- (El Salvador) Osmaro Santos (2024 - Present)
