= Real Antiguo Cuscatlán =

- Full name: Club Real Antiguo Cuscatlán
- Ground: Complejo Deportivo Teofilo Siman; Guazapa, San Salvador, El Salvador
- Manager: (El Salvador) Erick Molina
- League: Tercera Division de Fútbol Salvadoreño
- Clausura 2012: Grupo Centro Oriente A, 4th
Home colours	Away colours

Club Real Antiguo Cuscatlán is a Salvadoran professional football club originary from Antiguo Cuscatlán, La Libertad.

The club currently plays in the Tercera Division de Fútbol Salvadoreño.

== Honours ==
=== Domestic honours ===
==== Leagues ====
- Tercera División de Fútbol Salvadoreño and predecessors
  - Champions (2) : N/A
  - Play-off winner (2):
- La Asociación Departamental de Fútbol Aficionado' and predecessors (4th tier)
  - Champions - San Salvador Department (1) : 2022-23
  - Play-off winner (2):

== List of coaches ==
- (El Salvador) Will Cardonna (August 2023-)
- (El Salvador) Érick Molina
