= Ancla de Oro F.C. =

- Full name: Ancla de Oro Futból Clube
- Founded: 1963
- Ground: Cancha Municipal Moncagua, El Salvador
- Manager: Osmín Argueta
- League: Tercera División de Fútból Salvadoreño
Home colours	Away colours

Ancla de Oro Futból Clube is a Salvadoran professional football club based in Canton Huisquil, Conchagua, La Unión Department, El Salvador.

The club currently plays in the Tercera Division de Fútbol Salvadoreño after purchasing a spot.

== Honours ==
=== Domestic honours ===
==== Leagues ====
- Tercera División de Fútbol Salvadoreño and predecessors
  - Champions (2) : N/A
  - Play-off winner (2):
- La Asociación Departamental de Fútbol Aficionado and predecessors (4th tier)
  - Champions (1): La Paz Department 2024–2025
  - Play-off winner (2): 2024-2025 (Central)

== Current squad ==
As of: August 2025 Note: Flags indicate national team as defined under FIFA eligibility rules; some limited exceptions apply. Players may hold more than one non-FIFA nationality.

No.	Pos.	Nation	Player
—		SLV	TBD
—		SLV	TBD
—		SLV	TBD
—		SLV	TBD
—		SLV	TBD
—		SLV	TBD
—		SLV	TBD
—		SLV	TBD
—		SLV	TBD

No.	Pos.	Nation	Player
—		SLV	TBD
—		SLV	TBD
—		SLV	TBD
—		SLV	TBD
—		SLV	TBD
—		SLV	TBD
—		SLV	TBD
—		SLV	TBD
—		SLV	TBD

== List of coaches ==
- (El Salvador) Osmín Argueta (TBD - August 2025)
- (El Salvador) David Paz (August 2025 - Present)
