= El Congo =

- Municipality
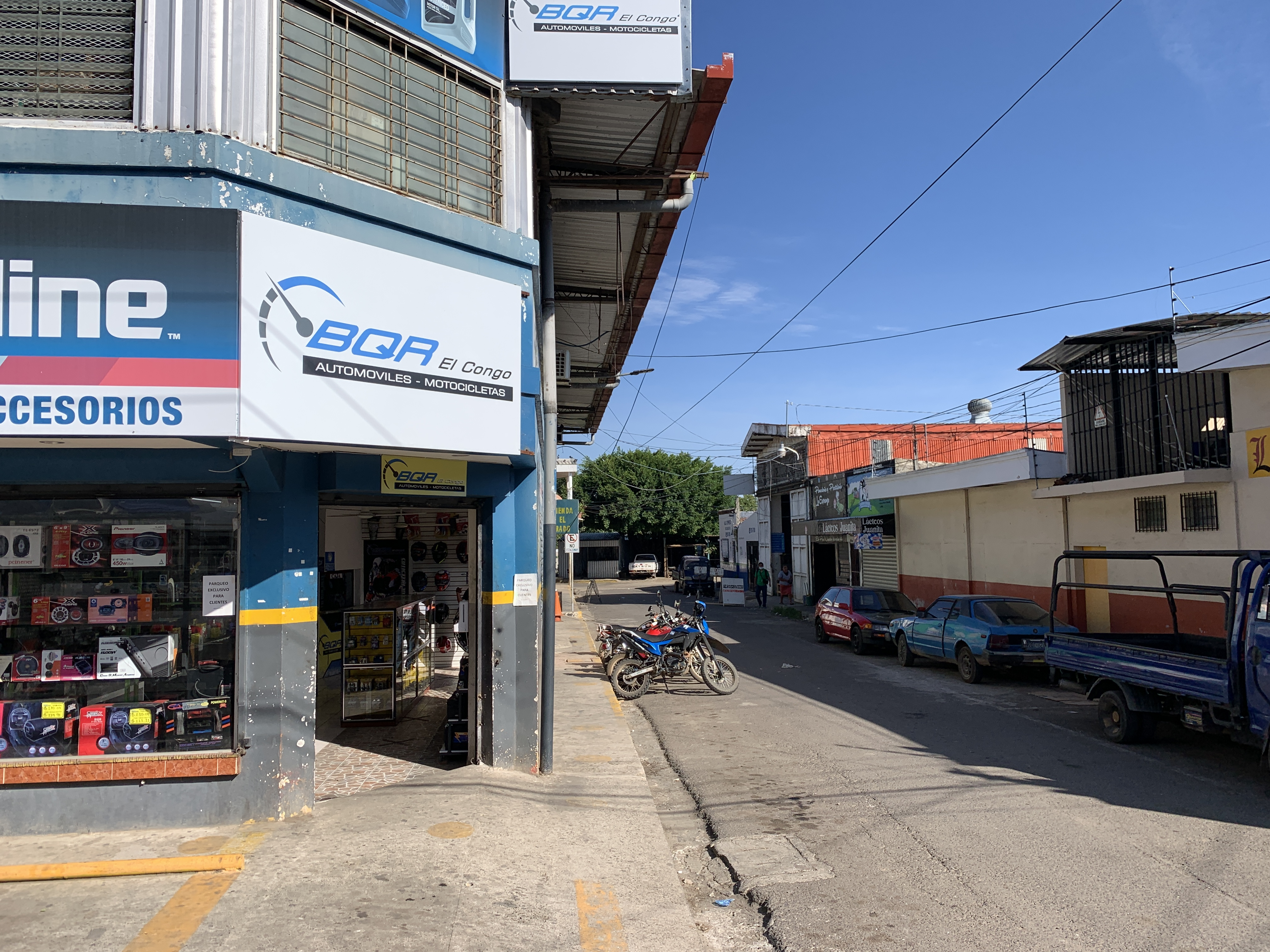

- Location in El Salvador
- Coordinates: 13°54′N 89°29′W
- Country: El Salvador
- Department: Santa Ana

Government
  - Mayor: Piro HDLGP

Area
  - Municipality: 35.30 sq mi (91.43 km^{2})
- Elevation: 2,760 ft (840 m)

Population
  - Municipality: 24,219

El Congo is a city and municipality in the Santa Ana department of El Salvador.
