= Jalacatal F.C. =

Jalacatal FC
- Full name: Jalacatal Futbol Clube
- Nickname(s): TBD
- Founded: 2007
- Ground: Estadio Municipal Quelapa, El Salvador
- Manager: Esteban Melara
- League: Tercera Division de Fútbol Salvadoreño
- Apertura 2018: TBD

Jalacatal Futbol Clube is a Salvadoran professional football club based in Canton Jalacatal, San miguel, El Salvador.

The club currently plays in the Tercera Division de Fútbol Salvadoreño.

The club was founded in 2007.

== Honours ==
- La Asociación Departamental de Fútbol Aficionado' and predecessors (4th tier)
  - Champions (1): 2016

== Current squad ==
As of:
Note: Flags indicate national team as defined under FIFA eligibility rules; some limited exceptions apply. Players may hold more than one non-FIFA nationality.

No. / Pos. / Nation / Player; — / / (El Salvador) SLV / Manfredy Sosa	No. / Pos. / Nation / Player; — / / (El Salvador) SLV / Ernesto Hernández

== Captain ==
- TBD (2016)

== Players ==
- (El Salvador)

== List of coaches ==
- (El Salvador) Jose Ramon Contreras (March 2017 – June 2017)
- (El Salvador) Esteban Melara (June 2017–)
