= C.D. Estrellas del Sur =

Association football club in El Salvador

- Full name: Club Deportivo Estrellas del Sur
- Founded: 1954
- Ground: Estadio Municipal Carlos Moon; Chirilagua, San Miguel, El Salvador
- Capacity: 5,000
- League: Tercera Division
Home colours

Club Deportivo Estrellas del Sur are a Salvadoran professional football club based in Chirilagua, El Salvador. They currently play in the Salvadoran Third Division.

== Honours ==
=== Domestic honours ===
- Segunda División Salvadorean and predecessors
- Champions (1) : TBD
- Tercera División Salvadorean and predecessors
  - Champions:(1) : TBD
- ADFAS and predecessors
  - Champions

== Current squad ==
As of: February 2024 Note: Flags indicate national team as defined under FIFA eligibility rules; some limited exceptions apply. Players may hold more than one non-FIFA nationality.

No.	Pos.	Nation	Player
2		SLV	Henry Hernandez
4		SLV	Jefry Flores
6		SLV	Mauricio Ulloa
7		SLV	Jael Menjivar
9		SLV	Rudys Ortiz
10		SLV	Luis Chavez
11		SLV	Luis Rivas
14		SLV	Edgar Chavez
20		SLV	Antonio Carranza
21		SLV	Wilfredo Perez

No.	Pos.	Nation	Player
23		SLV	Rafael Cruz
27		SLV	Esau Garcia
30		SLV	Denis Vigil
31	GK	SLV	Tomas Reyes
33		SLV	Isaac Pacheco
34		SLV	Jefferson Aleman
35		SLV	Fabricio Segovia
37		SLV	Leandro Hernandez
38		SLV	Kelvin Gallardo

=== Players with dual citizenship ===
- (El Salvador) (United States) TBD

=== In ===
Note: Flags indicate national team as defined under FIFA eligibility rules; some limited exceptions apply. Players may hold more than one non-FIFA nationality.

No.	Pos.	Nation	Player
—		SLV	Kevin Galindo (From Cruzeiro)
—		SLV	TBD (From TBD)
—		SLV	TBD (From TBD)
—		SLV	TBD (From TBD)

No.	Pos.	Nation	Player
—		SLV	TBD (From TBD)
—		SLV	TBD (From TBD)
—		SLV	TBD (From TBD)

=== Out ===
Note: Flags indicate national team as defined under FIFA eligibility rules; some limited exceptions apply. Players may hold more than one non-FIFA nationality.

No.	Pos.	Nation	Player
—		SLV	TBD (To TBD)
—		SLV	TBD (To TBD)
—		SLV	TBD (To TBD)
—		SLV	TBD (To TBD)

No.	Pos.	Nation	Player
—		SLV	TBD (To TBD)
—		SLV	TBD (To TBD)
—		SLV	TBD (To TBD)

== List of coaches ==
- (Colombia) Luis Marines
- (El Salvador) Kasselly Flores (January 2023-February 2024)
- (Colombia) Luis Carlos Asprilla (2025 - September 2025)
- (El Salvador) Mauricio Aguilar (September 2025-Present)
