= Juventud Alegre F.C. =

Juventud Alegre Futbol Club
- Full name: Juventud Alegre F.C.
- Manager: Ernesto Fernández
- League: Tercera Division de Fútbol Salvadoreño
- Clausura 2012: Grupo Centro Occidente A, 5th

Juventud Alegre Futbol Club is a Salvadoran professional football club based in Quezaltepeque, El Salvador.

The club is currently playing in the Tercera Division de Fútbol Salvadoreño.

== History ==
The club has played under the name Juventud Candelareña in the past.

== Coaches ==
- (El Salvador) Nelson Mauricio Ancheta (1994)
- (El Salvador) Jorge Abrego (2002)
