= C.D. Juventud Candelareño =

Association football club in El Salvador

Juventud Candelareno
- Full name: Club Deportivo Juventud Candelareno
- Founded: 1982
- Ground: Cancha Candelaria La Frontera, El Salvador
- League: Tercera Division de Fútbol Salvadoreño
- Apertura 2018: TBD

Club Deportivo Juventud Candelareño is a Salvadoran professional football club based in Chalchuapa (Candelaria La Frontera), Santa Ana, El Salvador.

The club currently plays in the Tercera Division de Fútbol Salvadoreño.

The club was founded in 1982

== Honours ==
=== Domestic honours ===
==== Leagues ====
- Tercera División Salvadorean and predecessors
  - Champions (2) : N/A
  - Play-off winner (2):
- La Asociación Departamental de Fútbol Aficionado' and predecessors (4th tier)
  - Champions (1):
  - Play-off winner (2):

== Current squad ==
Note: Flags indicate national team as defined under FIFA eligibility rules; some limited exceptions apply. Players may hold more than one non-FIFA nationality.

No.	Pos.	Nation	Player
—		(El Salvador) SLV	TBD
—		(El Salvador) SLV	TBD
—		(El Salvador) SLV	TBD
—		(El Salvador) SLV	TBD
—		(El Salvador) SLV	TBD

No.	Pos.	Nation	Player
—		(El Salvador) SLV	TBD
—		(El Salvador) SLV	TBD
—		(El Salvador) SLV	TBD

=== Players with dual citizenship ===
- (El Salvador) (United States) TBD

=== In ===
Note: Flags indicate national team as defined under FIFA eligibility rules; some limited exceptions apply. Players may hold more than one non-FIFA nationality.

No.	Pos.	Nation	Player
—		(El Salvador) SLV	TBD (From TBD)
—		(El Salvador) SLV	TBD (From TBD)
—		(El Salvador) SLV	TBD (From TBD)
—		(El Salvador) SLV	TBD (From TBD)

No.	Pos.	Nation	Player
—		(El Salvador) SLV	TBD (From TBD)
—		(El Salvador) SLV	TBD (From TBD)
—		(El Salvador) SLV	TBD (From TBD)

=== Out ===
Note: Flags indicate national team as defined under FIFA eligibility rules; some limited exceptions apply. Players may hold more than one non-FIFA nationality.

No.	Pos.	Nation	Player
—		(El Salvador) SLV	TBD (To TBD)
—		(El Salvador) SLV	TBD (To TBD)
—		(El Salvador) SLV	TBD (To TBD)
—		(El Salvador) SLV	TBD (To TBD)

No.	Pos.	Nation	Player
—		(El Salvador) SLV	TBD (To TBD)
—		(El Salvador) SLV	TBD (To TBD)
—		(El Salvador) SLV	TBD (To TBD)

== List of coaches ==
- (El Salvador) Nelson Mauricio Ancheta (1994)
- (El Salvador) Salvador Burgos (2022)
- (El Salvador) Juan Carlos Moscoso (2024)
