= Juventud Independiente (2021) =

Association football club in El Salvador

- Full name: Asosciaon Deportivo Juventud Independiente
- Founded: 2021
- Ground: Complejo San Juan Opico; San Juan Opico, San Salvador department, El Salvador
- Chairman: Abner Solano,
- Manager: (El Salvador) Juan Ramón Sánchez
- League: Tercera Division de Fútbol Salvadoreño
- Grupo Centro Oriente A, 4th
Home colours	Away colours

Assosciaon Deportivo Juventud Independiente is a Salvadoran professional football club based in San Juan Opico, San Salvador department, El Salvador.

The club currently plays in the Tercera Division de Fútbol Salvadoreño.

== Honours ==
=== Domestic honours ===
==== Leagues ====
- Tercera División de Fútbol Salvadoreño and predecessors
  - Champions (2) : N/A
  - Play-off winner (2):
- La Asociación Departamental de Fútbol Aficionado' and predecessors (4th tier)
  - Champions (1):
  - Play-off winner (2):

== Current squad ==
Note: Flags indicate national team as defined under FIFA eligibility rules; some limited exceptions apply. Players may hold more than one non-FIFA nationality.

No.	Pos.	Nation	Player
3		SLV	Gilberto Echeverria
5		SLV	William Escobar
9		SLV	Jesus Ochoa
15		SLV	Michael Antero
16		SLV	Josue Gálvez
17		SLV	Kevin Mercado
19		SLV	Jonathan Cortez
21		SLV	Henry Carpio
22		SLV	Fernando Torres
29		SLV	Fredy Portillo
30	GK	SLV	Elmer Sandoval
—		SLV	Alejandro Cruz
—		SLV	Javier García
—		SLV	Brayan Marquez
—		SLV	Adonis Tobar
—		SLV	Elmer Sermeno
—		SLV	Raul Rosa
—		SLV	Jose Rivera

No.	Pos.	Nation	Player
1		SLV	Emilio Rivera
2		SLV	Brandon Ramírez
7		SLV	Felix Anaya
6		SLV	Josue Velasco
11		SLV	Bryan Paz
20		SLV	Carlos Trujillo
23		SLV	Cesar Omar Lemus
26		SLV	Carlos Garcia (captain)
—		SLV	Henry Quinteros
—		SLV	Eduardo Ronquillo
—		SLV	Alexis Velasco

=== In ===
Note: Flags indicate national team as defined under FIFA eligibility rules; some limited exceptions apply. Players may hold more than one non-FIFA nationality.

No.	Pos.	Nation	Player
—		SLV	Omar Galdamez (From TBD)
—		SLV	Oscar Menjivar (From TBD)
—		SLV	Joel Osorio (From TBD)
—		SLV	Erick Galdamez (From TBD)

No.	Pos.	Nation	Player
—		SLV	Raul Rosa (From TBD)
—		SLV	Jose Rivera (From TBD)
—		COL	Cristian Caicedo (From TBD)

=== Out ===
Note: Flags indicate national team as defined under FIFA eligibility rules; some limited exceptions apply. Players may hold more than one non-FIFA nationality.

No.	Pos.	Nation	Player
—		COL	Jose Medrano (To TBD)
—		SLV	TBD (To TBD)
—		SLV	TBD (To TBD)
—		SLV	TBD (To TBD)

No.	Pos.	Nation	Player
—		SLV	TBD (To TBD)
—		SLV	TBD (To TBD)
—		SLV	TBD (To TBD)

== List of coaches ==
- (El Salvador) Bairon García (June 2022-2024)
- (El Salvador) Juan Ramón Sánchez (June 2024-Present)
