= San Jerónimo Nejapa =

- Full name: San Jerónimo Nejapa
- Nickname(s): TBD
- Founded: 2013
- Ground: Estadio Vitoria Gasterez, El Salvador
- League: Tercera Division de Fútbol Salvadoreño
- Apertura 2018: TBD

San Jerónimo Nejapa is a Salvadoran professional football club based in Nejapa, El Salvador.

The club currently plays in the Tercera Division de Fútbol Salvadoreño.

The club was founded in 2013.

== List of coaches ==
- (El Salvador) René Martínez
