= Quelepa (district) =

- District
- Location in El Salvador
- Coordinates: 13°31′11″N 88°14′02″W
- Country: El Salvador
- Department: San Miguel Department
- Elevation: 1,410 ft (430 m)

Population (2024)
  - Total: 7,062

Quelepa is a district in the San Miguel department of El Salvador. It is located closely to the Quelepa archaeological site.
