= Verapaz, El Salvador =

Verapaz
- Municipality
- Location in El Salvador
- Coordinates: 13°39′N 88°52′W
- Country: El Salvador
- Department: San Vicente Department
- Elevation: 2,162 ft (659 m)

Verapaz is a municipality in the San Vincente department of El Salvador. Verapaz means 'true peace' (from Spanish 'verdadera' [true] and 'paz' [peace]). It has been the site of two recent natural disasters; an earthquake measuring 6.6 on the Moment magnitude scale on 13 February 2001 and the 2009 Salvador floods and mudslides in November 2009.
