= Santa Rosa Guachipilín =

- District
- Location in El Salvador
- Coordinates: 14°12′N 89°21′W
- Country: El Salvador
- Department: Santa Ana

Government
  - Mayor: Hugo Besael Flores Magaña

Area
  - Municipality: 14.83 sq mi (38.40 km^{2})
- Elevation: 1,410 ft (430 m)

Population (2024)
  - District: 4,260
  - Rank: 207th in El Salvador
  - Rural: 4,260
  - Municipality: 4,930

Santa Rosa Guachipilín is a city and municipality in the Santa Ana department of El Salvador situated close to the Lempa River.
