= Masahuat =

- District
- Location in El Salvador
- Coordinates: 14°11′N 89°25′W
- Country: El Salvador
- Department: Santa Ana

Government
  - Mayor: Menando Nahúm Mendoza Rosales

Area
  - Municipality: 27.50 sq mi (71.23 km^{2})
- Elevation: 1,180 ft (360 m)

Population (2024)
  - District: 2,762
  - Rank: 235th in El Salvador
  - Rural: 2,762

Masahuat is a city and municipality in the Santa Ana department of El Salvador.

Masahuat is a small town in the State of Santa Ana. El Salvador's main river, Lempa runs near it. Lempa's current is very strong during the monsoon (winter season to the locals they only have two sets of season summer and winter but its more like a spring) season but weak during the summer; until a few years ago the town was inaccessible by vehicle during the rainy winter months, and residents had to cross the river over hanging foot-bridges. After a road bridge was built, the town became accessible by vehicle year round. One bridge also provides access to Cerro Los Flores and other small towns nearby. The foot bridge that went from Masahuat to Colonia Zacamil its neighboring town is now destroyed due to the lack of use it wasn't cared for.

Residents are mostly farmers, with corn and beans being the crop of choice. Cattle is also raised in the town and its surroundings. Many of the town's natives have left the country and emigrated temporarily or permanently to the United States. This emigration started in the 1970s and 1980s during El Salvador's civil war. After the war ended, the country's economy forced many other mostly men to leave the country and seek employment in the United States.

Many of Masahuat's natives have settled in Northwest Arkansas in the United States, drawn by the low cost of living and the abundance of poultry and construction jobs in the area. This migration to Arkansas by not only Masahuat native's but Salvador nationals in general greatly increased during the 1990s, as can be seen by US Census data.
