= San Antonio Pajonal =

- District
- Location in El Salvador
- Coordinates: 14°11′N 89°34′W
- Country: El Salvador
- Department: Santa Ana

Government
  - Mayor: Walter Oswaldo Martínez Rivera

Area
  - Municipality: 20.05 sq mi (51.92 km^{2})
- Elevation: 1,600 ft (500 m)

Population (2024)
  - District: 3,168
  - Rank: 227th in El Salvador
  - Rural: 3,168

San Antonio Pajonal is a city and municipality in the Santa Ana department of El Salvador. A village of the same name was founded in the 19th century while the municipality was created on November 13, 1945. It's very quiet and attracts some tourists.
