= San Sebastián Salitrillo =

- Municipality
- Location in El Salvador
- Coordinates: 13°57′N 89°38′W
- Country: El Salvador
- Department: Santa Ana

Government
  - Mayor: Hugo Edgardo Rosales Calidonio

Area
  - Municipality: 16.34 sq mi (42.32 km^{2})
- Elevation: 2,533 ft (772 m)

Population
  - Municipality: 18,566

San Sebastián Salitrillo is a city and municipality in the Santa Ana department of El Salvador.
