= Ciudad Arce =

- District
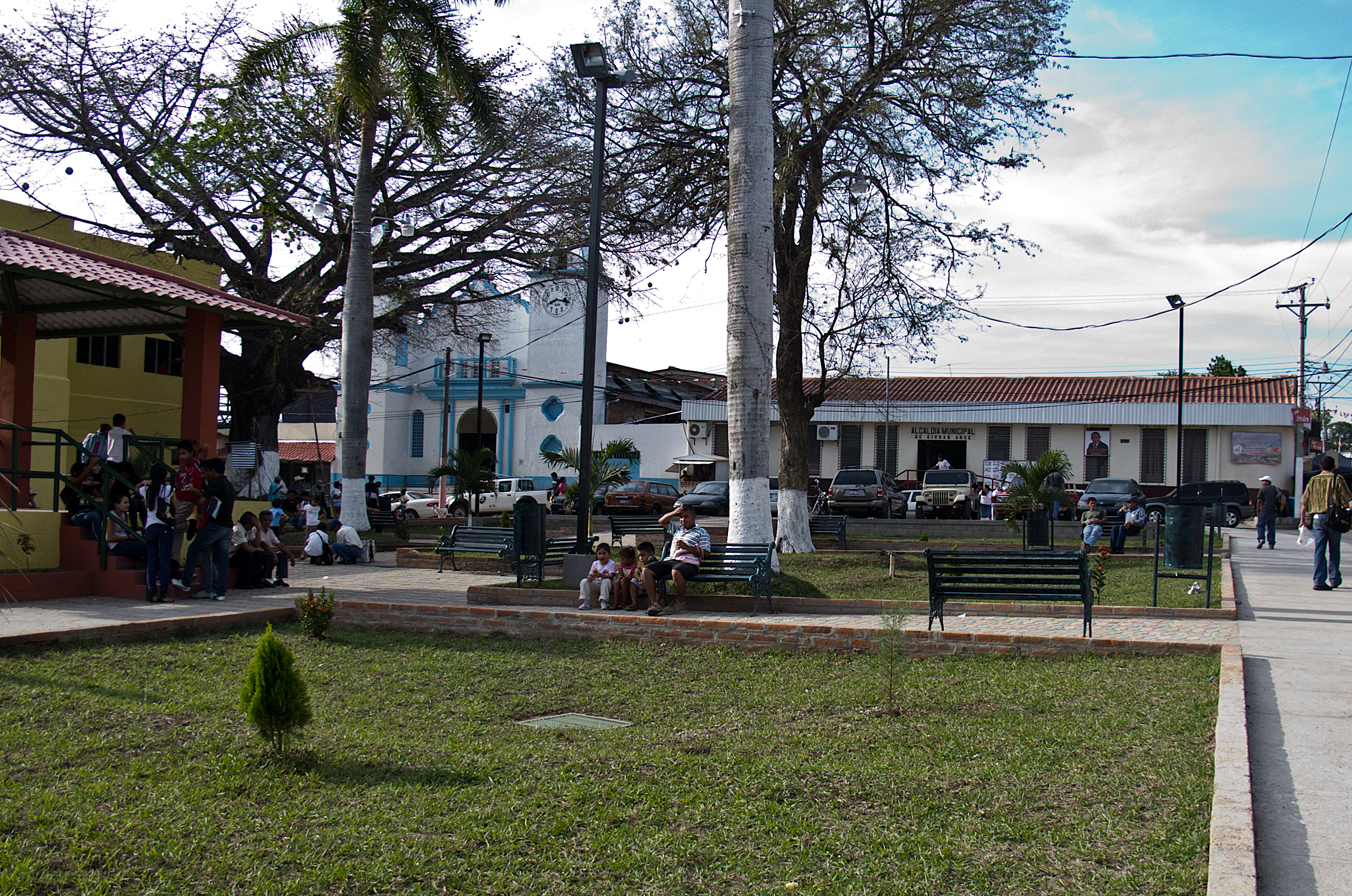
- Downtown Ciudad Arce and the municipal building

- Location in El Salvador
- Coordinates: 13°50′N 89°26′W
- Country: El Salvador
- Department: La Libertad
- Elevation: 1,811 ft (552 m)

Population (2024)
  - District: 65,550
  - Rank: 20th in El Salvador
  - Urban: 59,423
  - Rural: 6,127

Ciudad Arce is a municipality in the La Libertad department of El Salvador. It is approximately 25 kilometres (16 mi) northwest of the national capital, San Salvador. It is named after Manuel José Arce.
