= C.D. UDET =

Association football club in El Salvador

- Full name: Club Deportivo Unión Deportiva El Tránsito
- Nickname: Los Pochoteños
- Founded: 1951
- Ground: Cancha César Antonio Angulo, El Tránsito, El Salvador
- Manager: Omar Sevilla
Home colours	Away colours

Club Deportivo UDET is a Salvadoran professional football club based in El Tránsito, San Miguel, El Salvador.

== History ==
Founded by a local tailor in 1951, the team was exclusively made up of tailors in its first years. UDET has swapped divisions over the years but never made it to the Premier Division.

During the 2004 Clausura season, UDET only managed to include 10 players in the lineup against A.D. Municipal. Municipal was given the win and UDET was threatened with demotion to the Third Division.

== Honours ==
=== Domestic honours ===
- Segunda División Salvadorean and predecessors
- Champions (1) : TBD
- Tercera División Salvadorean and predecessors
  - Champions:(1) : Apertura 2015

== Current squad ==
As of: Note: Flags indicate national team as defined under FIFA eligibility rules; some limited exceptions apply. Players may hold more than one non-FIFA nationality.

No. / Pos. / Nation / Player; — / / SLV / Enrique Quintanilla	No. / Pos. / Nation / Player; — / / SLV

== Notable players ==
- (El Salvador) Luis David Penado

=== Internationals who have played at UDET ===
- (El Salvador) Leonel Guevara
- (El Salvador) (Colombia) Elder José Figueroa

== List of coaches ==
Name	Nationality	Tenure
David de Jesus	(El Salvador)	1971
David Silva “Chimiza”	(El Salvador)	1972
Ramón Velásquez	(El Salvador)	2002
Pedro Apeté	(Argentina)	2002-2003
Danilo Portillo	(El Salvador)	2003
Ricardo Rivera	(El Salvador)	2003
Ricardo Quintanilla	(El Salvador)	2004
Nelson Granadas	(El Salvador)	2013
Victor Fuentes	(El Salvador)	2015–2016
Israel Cruz	(El Salvador)	2016
Miguel Aguilar Obando	(El Salvador)	June 2017
Erazmo Lazo	(El Salvador)	2017– Mar 2018
Eraldo Correia	(Brazil)	Mar 2018 – May 2018
Miguel Aguilar Obando	(El Salvador)	July 2018– Dec 2018
Omar Sevilla	(El Salvador)	Dec 2018– June 2019
TBD	(El Salvador)	July 2019
Efrain Nunez	(Honduras)	August 2019–October 2019
Isidro Soriano	(El Salvador)	Oct 2019– Present
David Silva (Chimisa)	(El Salvador)	2022– Present
