= Sociedad, El Salvador =

Important Municipality of El Salvador

Sociedad
- Municipality
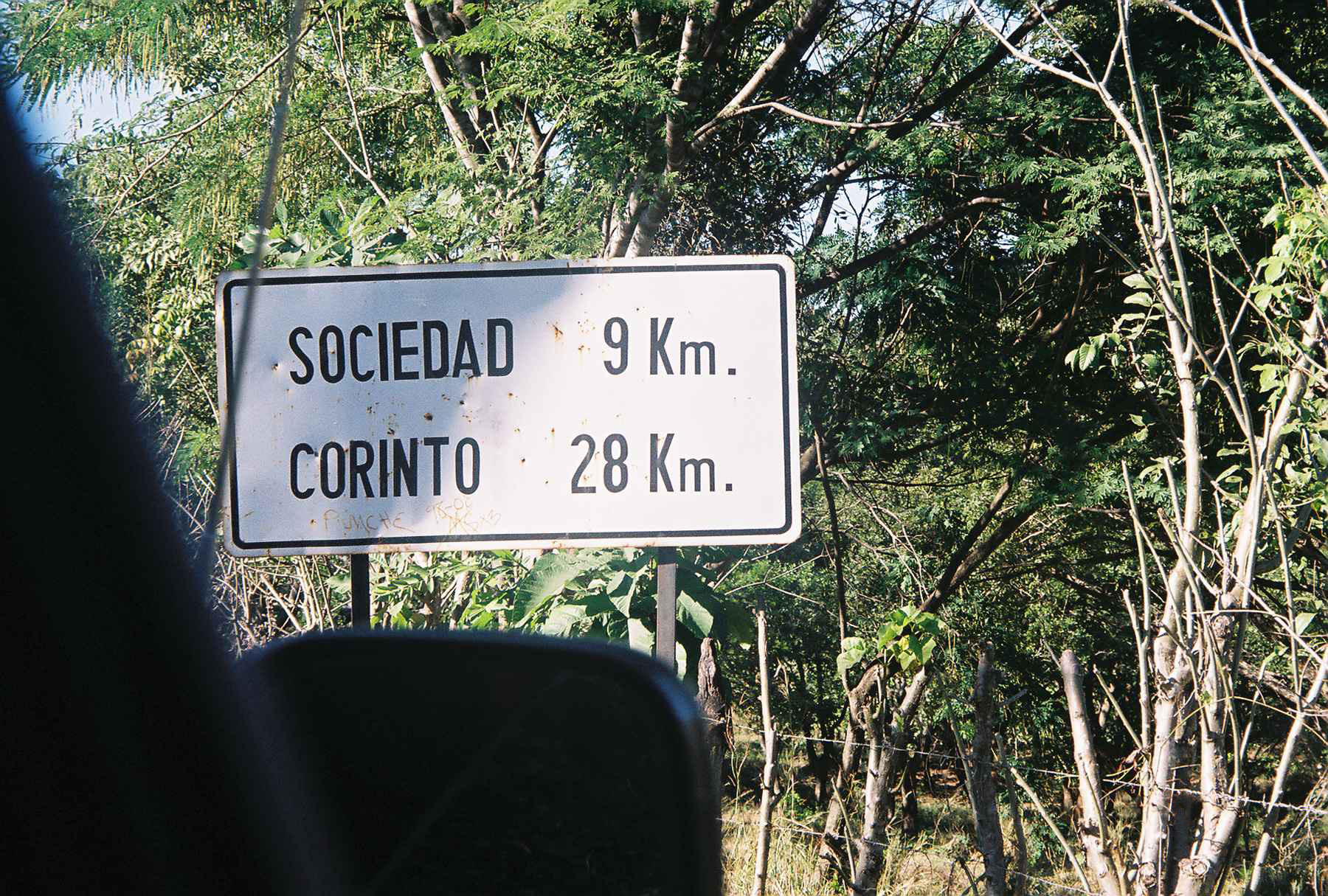
- Road sign near Sociedad, Morazán

- Location in El Salvador
- Coordinates: 13°42′N 88°1′W
- Country: El Salvador
- Department: Morazán Department
- Elevation: 1,201 ft (366 m)

Sociedad is a municipality in the Morazán department of El Salvador It lies between La Unión and San Miguel, both of which are departments of El Salvador.

== History ==
The town was founded on April 18, 1838, by the political and military Governor of San Miguel, Colonel Narciso Benítez of Colombian nationality, who had been Simón Bolívar's lieutenant. In 1874 the town was granted the title of "town", and it was annexed to the department of Morazán the following year. An infamous event that occurred in the jurisdiction of the town was the execution of Braulio Carrillo Colina, who had served as president of Costa Rica. In the report of May 16, 1878 made by Governor Jacinto Aguirre describes a time of rapid progress lasting 30 years, stimulated by the exploitation of the minerals of "Monte Mayor" and the dedication to the trade and cultivation of indigo, but the exploitation of the mineral works was suspended, and, due to the fall in the price of indigo, cultivation and commercialization were stopped. This caused a "paralysis" of the progress of the population. The report also describes the town: it had a "nice" church, a spacious town hall with secure jails, and a room used for school. The cemetery was surrounded by an adobe wall.

== Culture ==
The patronal festival of Sociedad is celebrated from June 23 to 24 in honor of John the Baptist.
