= San Alejo =

San Alejo, El Salvador
- District
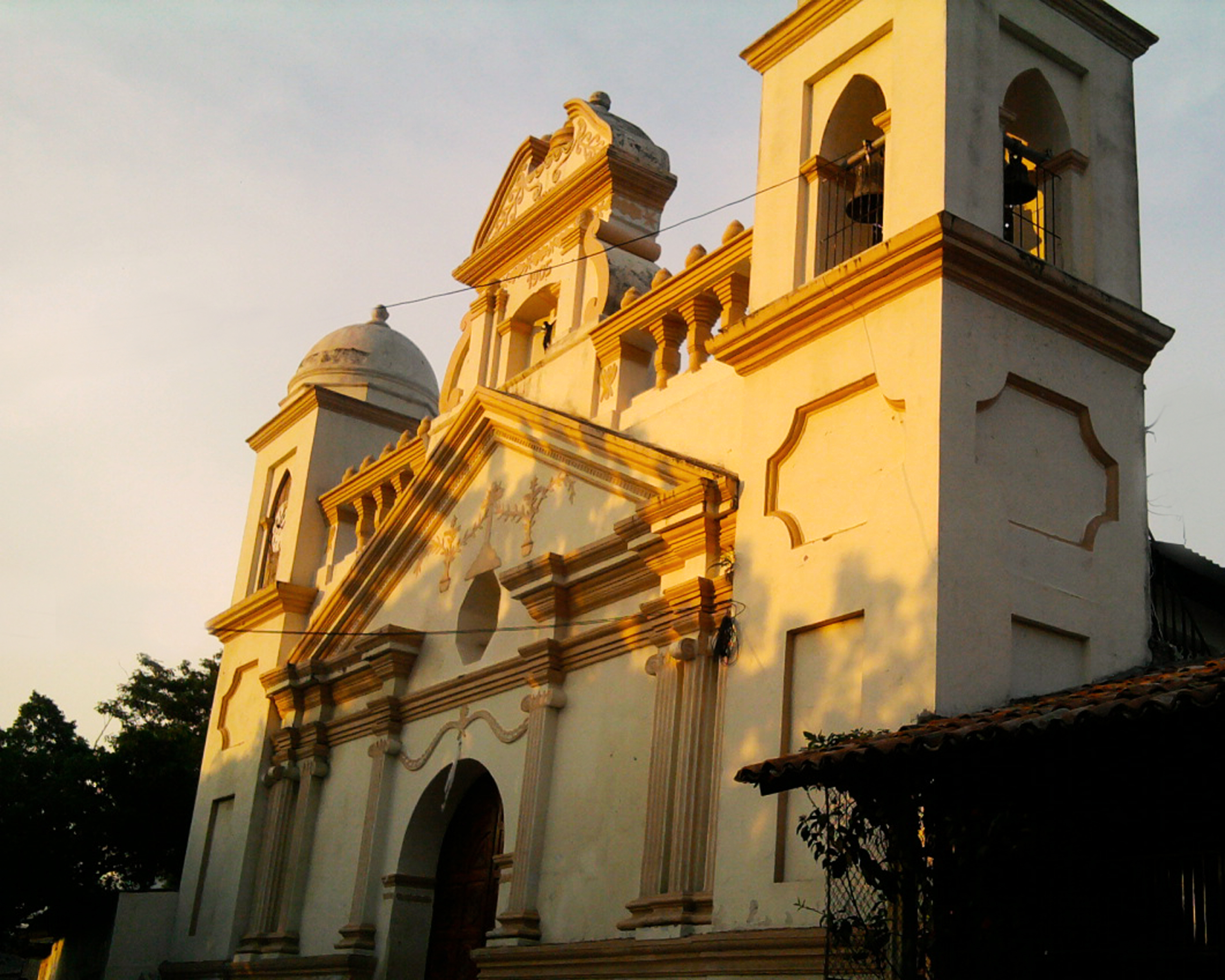
- Parroquial Church of San Alejo
- Nickname: Pueblo de Piedra ( The Rock Town)
- Location in El Salvador
- Coordinates: 13°26′N 87°58′W
- Country: El Salvador
- Department: La Unión Department

Area
  - Urban: 17,990 sq mi (46,600 km^{2})
- Elevation: 620 ft (189 m)

Population (17,990 (2020)
  - District: 17,990

San Alejo is a district in the La Unión department of El Salvador.

== History ==
A mid-18th century, in the parish of Conchagua, there was the San Alejo de Pedregal, rocky site known as Queiquín native Lenca. These natives had yayantiques neighbors as its rivals. Shortly after a brawl that took place in 1771 among such enemies, the Supreme Head of the Province of San Miguel ordered to organize a village in the land donated by the owners of the property. With the creation of the Municipality of San Salvador in 1785, the town went on to become the capital of one of the 15 games.

On June 9, 1809, the Court of Fidelity, based in San Miguel, imprisoned and confiscated the property of Just Zaldivar (originally from San Alejo) and Valentin Porras, being promoters of "subversive ideas" against the authorities of the Spanish crown. These facts suggest that both were the first subjects to suffer persecution in the Central American territory by the colonial power. Also, in December 1811 there was another follow-up sedition November independence movement, but was put out. Amid the events Zaldivar tried to flee to Honduras, but was imprisoned in San Miguel where he died.

On March 11, 1827, the village officially received the title of "villa". In 1854 he joined the district of La Union and in 1865 was established as a municipality in the department. On February 3, 1870, obtained the title of "city" under the administration of Francisco Dueñas. By 1890 in San Alejo lived around 2880 people. Rafael Zaldivar, president of El Salvador in the second half of the 19th century, was born in this place.

== General information ==
The district covers an area of 251.64 km ² and its head has an altitude of 170 meters. The festivities are celebrated in the month of July in honor of the patron San Alejo and in the month of January in honor of the Lord of Miracles. Queiquín The original name means "stone town" or "stony place."

== Notable people ==
- Alfonso Perla (born 1982), professional footballer
