= San Rafael Oriente =

- Municipality
- Location in El Salvador
- Coordinates: 13°23′N 88°21′W
- Country: El Salvador
- Department: San Miguel Department
- Elevation: 650 ft (198 m)

Population (2024)
  - Total: 11,958

San Rafael Oriente is a municipality in the San Miguel department of El Salvador.
