= Santa Ana Department =

Department of El Salvador

Santa Ana
- Department
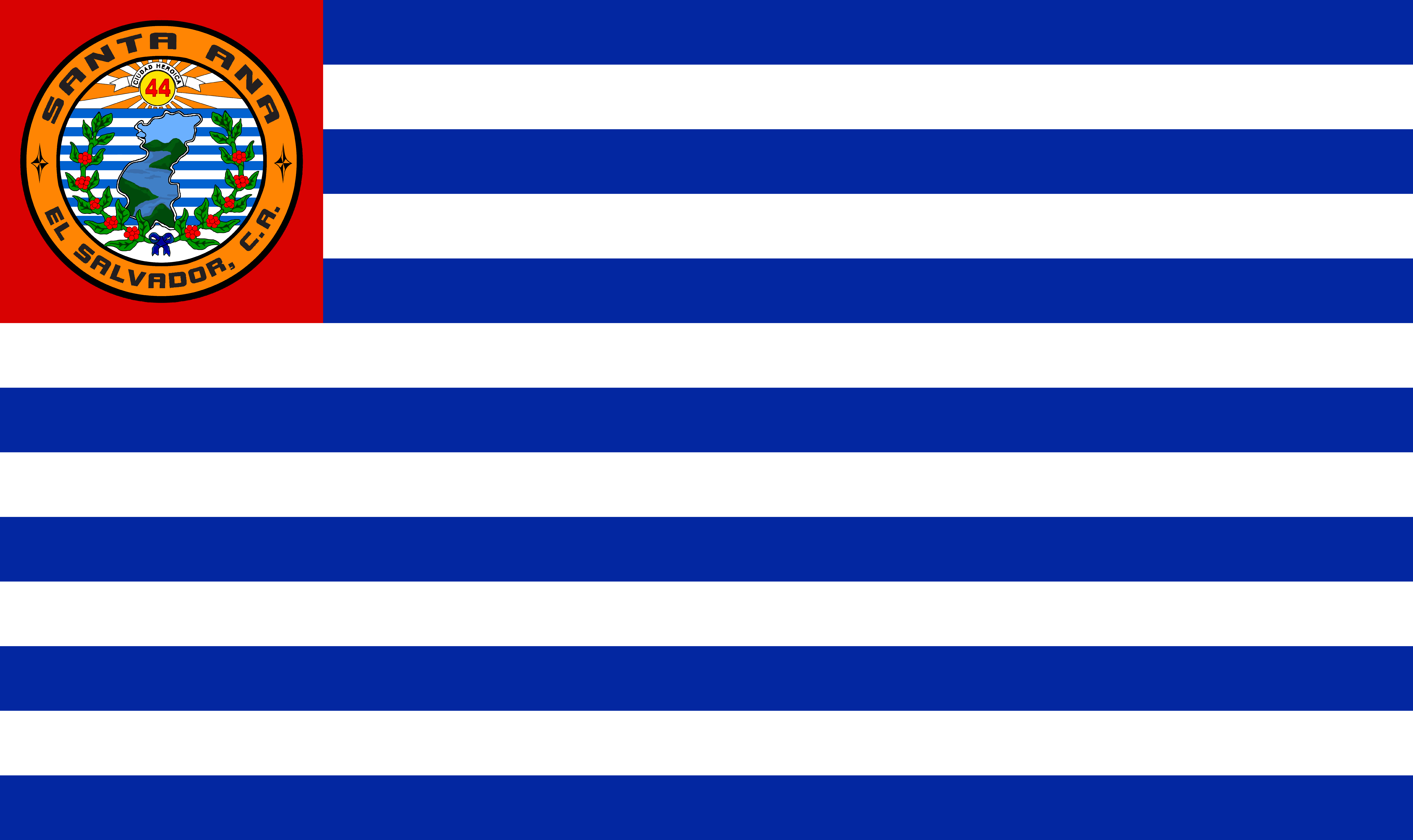
- Flag Coat of arms

- Location within El Salvador
- Coordinates: 14°05′24″N 89°30′40″W
- Country: El Salvador
- Created (given current status): 1855
- Seat: Santa Ana

Area
  - Total: 2,023.2 km^{2} (781.2 sq mi)
  - Rank: Ranked 4th

Population (2024)
  - Total: 552,938
  - Rank: Ranked 4th
  - Density: 273.30/km^{2} (707.84/sq mi)
- Time zone: UTC−6 (CST)
- ISO 3166 code: SV-SA

Santa Ana (Spanish pronunciation: [ˈsanta ˈana]) is a department of El Salvador in the northwest of the country. The capital is Santa Ana, one of the largest cities in El Salvador. The Santa Ana Volcano is located in this department.

== Geography ==
=== Municipalities ===
Santa Ana is divided into 13 districts and 4 municipalities:

1. Santa Ana Centro
2. Santa Ana Este
3. Santa Ana Norte
4. Santa Ana Oeste

=== Districts ===
Municipality	Territory	Population
Candelaria de la Frontera	91.13 km^{2}	33,550 hab.
Chalchuapa	165.76 km^{2}	86,200 hab.
Coatepeque	126.85 km^{2}	48,544 hab.
El Congo	91.43 km^{2}	22,274 hab.
El Porvenir	52.52 km^{2}	7,819 hab.
Masahuat	71.23 km^{2}	5,125 hab.
Metapán	668.36 km^{2}	59,499 hab.
San Antonio Pajonal	51.92 km^{2}	4,574 hab.
San Sebastián Salitrillo	42.32 km^{2}	16,688 hab.
Santa Ana	400.05 km^{2}	261,568 hab.
Santa Rosa Guachipilín	38.41 km^{2}	7,909 hab.
Santiago de la Frontera	44.22 km^{2}	9,150 hab.
Texistepeque	178.97 km^{2}	20,904 hab.
