= 2016–17 Segunda División de Fútbol Salvadoreño =

Segunda División de Fútbol Salvadoreño
- Season: 2016–17
- Champions: Apertura: Independiente, Clausura: Audaz
- Promoted: TBD
- Relegated: Vendaval and Leones de Occidente

The 2016–17 season (officially known as Liga de Plata and also as Torneo Luis Baltazar Ramírez) will be El Salvador's Segunda División de Fútbol Salvadoreño The season will be split into two championships Apertura 2016 and Clausura 2017. The champions of the Apertura and Clausura play the direct promotion playoff every year. The winner of that series ascends to Primera División de Fútbol de El Salvador.

== Changes from the 2016-2017 seasons ==
Teams promoted to 2016–17 Primera División de Fútbol Profesional season

- C.D. Municipal Limeño

Teams relegated to Segunda División de Fútbol Salvadoreño - Apertura 2016

- Atletico Marte

Teams relegated to Tercera División de Fútbol Profesional - Apertura 2016

- Ciclón del Golfo

Teams promoted from Tercera Division De Fútbol Profesional - Apertura 2016

- Turin FESA
- Jocoro F.C.
- Rácing Jr

New Teams or teams that purchased a spot in the Segunda division

- Brujos de Izalco (Quequeisque changed their name and location to Brujos de Izalco)
- EF San Pablo Tacachico (originally de-registered but bought the spot of Toros FC)

Teams that failed to register for the Apertura 2016

- EF San Pablo Tacachico (Team de-registered due to breaking player rules)
- C.D. Brasilia (Team de-registered due to not paying their debts)
- C.D. UDET (they were given a spot from Brasilia who had failed to pay their debts, however since they had formally joined terceea division they were not allowed)
- Toros (sold their spot to San Pablo)

== Team information ==
A total of 23 teams will contest the league, including sides from the 2015–16 Segunda División and 3 promoted from the Tercera Division.

Zona Occidental
Team	Stadium	Capacity
Once Municipal		
Once Lobos		
Leones de Occidente		
Brujos de Izalco		
Rácing Jr		
EF San Pablo Tacachico		
Atl Apopa		
Turin FESA		

Zona Central
Team	Stadium	Capacity
Atletico Comalapa		
Marte Soyapango		
Atletico Marte		
Vendaval		
San Rafael Cedros		
Audaz		
El Roble		

Zona Oriental
Team	Stadium	Capacity
La Asuncion		
Fuerte San Francisco		
Jocoro		
Firpo		
Topiltzin		
Aspirante		
Platense		
Independiente		

== Teams ==
Team	Location	Stadium	Capacity	Manager	Captain	Kit Sponsor	Primera Division Affiliate or Partnership
Atletico Apopa	Apopa	Estadio Joaquin Gutierrez	5,000	(El Salvador) Marcos Antonio Portillo	(El Salvador)		
Atletico Marte	Ilopango	Estadio Azteca	2,000	(Chile) Juan Carlos Carreño	(El Salvador)		
Aspirante	Usulutan	Estadio Municipal de Jucuapa	3,000	(El Salvador) Joaquin Perez	(El Salvador)		
Audaz	Apastepeque, San Vicente	Estadio La Coyotera	2,000	(El Salvador) Efrain Burgos	(El Salvador)		
Brujos de Izalco	Izalco	Estadio Salvador Mariona		(El Salvador) Jorge Calles	(El Salvador)	None	Smart Office Business Center
Comalapa	Chalatenango	Estadio Municipal de Comalapa		(Uruguay) Pablo Quiñones	(El Salvador)	None	
El Roble	Ilobasco	Estadio Mauricio Vides	4,000	(El Salvador) Fausto Vasquez	(El Salvador)	KS	
Firpo II	Usultutan	Sergio Torres Stadium	5,000	(El Salvador) Carlos Mario Joya	(El Salvador)	TBD	Firpo
Fuerte San Francisco	San Francisco Gotera, Morazan	Estadio Correcaminos	12,000	(Peru) Yahir Camero	(El Salvador)		
Independiente	San Vicente	Estadio Vicentino	8,000	(El Salvador) Nelson Ancheta	(El Salvador)		Caja de Credito San Vicente, Injiboa
Jocoro	Jocoro, Morazan	Complejo Deportivo Tierra de Fuego		(El Salvador) Edwin Garay	(El Salvador)		
La Asuncion	Anamoros	Estadio Jose Eliseo Reyes	5,000	(Brazil) Eraldo Correia	(El Salvador) TBD		MAXH3,
Leones de Occidente	Metapan	Estadio Jorge Calero Suarez	8,000	(Chile) Hector Jara	(El Salvador)		
Marte Soyapango	Soyapango	Complejo Deportivo Espana	5,000	(El Salvador) Ricardo Serrano	(El Salvador)		
Once Lobos	Chalchuapa	Estadio Once Lobos	2,000	(El Salvador) Ivan Ruiz	(El Salvador)		
Once Municipal	Ahuachapan	Estadio Simeon Magana	5,000	(El Salvador) Víctor Coreas	(El Salvador)		
Platense	Zacatecoluca	Estadio Antonio Toledo Valle	10,000	(El Salvador) Miguel Aguilar Obando	(El Salvador)		
Rácing Jr	Armenia, Sonsonate	Estadio 21 de Noviembre		(El Salvador) Carlos Romero	(El Salvador)		
EF San Pablo Tacachico	San Pablo Tacachico	Cancha Municipal Valle Meza		(El Salvador) Bairon Ernesto Garcia	(El Salvador)		
San Rafael Cedros	San Rafael Cedros, Cuscatlan	Estadio Anastacio Aquino		(El Salvador) Victor Giron	(El Salvador)		
Topiltzin	Usulutan	Estadio Topiltzin de Jiquilisco	5,000	(El Salvador) Sebastian Hernandez	(El Salvador)		
Turin FESA	Santa Tecla	Estadio Las Delicias	10,000	(Argentina) Pablo Andrés Leguizamo	(El Salvador)		
Vendaval	Apopa	Estadio Joaquin Gutierrez	5,000	(El Salvador) Carlos Orellana	(El Salvador)		

Affiliate
Partnership

== Managerial changes ==
Team	Outgoing manager	Manner of departure	Date of vacancy	Replaced by	Date of appointment	Position in table
Pre-Apertura Changes
	(El Salvador)	Resigned	2016	(El Salvador)	2016	th
	(El Salvador)	Resigned	2016	(El Salvador)	2016	th
Apertura Changes
Audaz	(El Salvador) Wilson Angulo	Resigned	September 2016	(El Salvador) Jorge Abrego	September 2016	th
Independiente	(El Salvador) Nelson Ancheta	Resigned to become coach of Dragon	September 2016	(El Salvador) Willy Mirnda (interim)	September 2016	th
Fuerte San Francisco	(Peru) Yahir Camero	Sacked	September 2016	(El Salvador) Luis Dagoberto Sosa (interim)	September 2016	th
Leones de Occidente	(Chile) Hector Jara	Resigned due to lack of payment	October 2016	(El Salvador) Edwin Portillo	October 2016	th
Platense	(El Salvador) Miguel Aguilar Obando	Resigned	September 2016	(El Salvador) Ervin Loza (interim)	September 2016	th
Fuerte San Francisco	(El Salvador) Luis Dagoberto Sosa	Interimship finished	October 2016	(El Salvador) Omar Sevilla	October 2016	th
Platense	(El Salvador) Ervin Loza	Interimship finished	October 2016	(El Salvador) Salvador Velasquez Lovo	October 2016	th
Independiente	(El Salvador) Willy Mirnda (interim)	Interimship finished	October 2016	(Uruguay) Ruben Alonso	October 2016	th
	(El Salvador)	Resigned	2016	(El Salvador)	2016	th
Pre-Clausura Changes
FC San Rafael Cedros	(El Salvador) Victor Giron	Resigned	2016	(El Salvador) Juan Ramon Paredes	2016	th
C.D. Vendaval Apopa	(El Salvador) Carlos Orellana	Resigned	2016	(El Salvador) Francisco Hernandez	2016	th
Atletico Comalapa	(Uruguay) Pablo Quiñones	Resigned	2016	(El Salvador) Jorge Abrego	2016	th
Atletico Marte	(Chile) Juan Carlos Carreño	Resigned	2016	(El Salvador) Luis Guevara Mora	2016	th
Fuerte San Francisco	(El Salvador) Omar Sevilla	Mutual Consent, Later went on to become coach of Pasaquina	2016	(Colombia) Luis Carlos Asprilla	2016	th
Once Municipal	(El Salvador) Víctor Coreas	Resigned	2016	(Argentina) Juan Andrés Sarulyte	2016	th
Audaz	(El Salvador) Jorge Abrego	Resigned	2016	(El Salvador) German Perez	2016	th
	(El Salvador)	Resigned	2016	(El Salvador)	2016	th
	(El Salvador)	Resigned	2016	(El Salvador)	2016	th
Clausura Changes
Platense	(El Salvador) Salvador Velasquez Lovo	Sacked	February 2017	(El Salvador) Mario Martinez	February 2017	th
	(El Salvador)	Resigned	2016	(El Salvador)	2016	th
	(El Salvador)	Resigned	2016	(El Salvador)	2016	th

== Apertura 2016 ==
=== Group A ===
==== Results ====
Home \ Away	APO	BRU	LEO	OLB	OMU	RAC	SAN	TUR
Atlético Apopa		2–3	2–2	2–3	1–2	3–1	0–3	3–3
Brujos de Izalco	2–1		1–2	2–2	1–0	1–4	1–0	1–1
Leones de Occidente	1–2	2–2		0–1	1–2	1–0	1–0	0–0
Once Lobos	5–1	2–2	3–2		1–0	0–0	0–0	2–2
Once Municipal	2–0	0–2	2–0	3–1		1–1	1–0	0–1
Rácing Jr	4–0	1–0	5–1	1–3	2–1		2–2	1–1
San Pablo	3–1	3–0	4–2	4–0	3–2	1–0		0–1
Turin	5–0	2–1	4–1	2–0	1–1	1–2	2–1	

Updated to match(es) played on unknown. Source:
Legend: Blue = home team win; Yellow = draw; Red = away team win.

=== Group B ===
==== Results ====
Home \ Away	AUD	COM	ROB	MAR	SOY	SRC	VEN
Audaz		1–2	1–0	0–0	1–2	2–0	1–1
Compala	1–1		0–1	1–0	1–1	2–2	1–0
El Roble	1–0	3–1		1–2	0–2	1–1	3–2
Marte	2–1	0–1	1–6		1–1	2–3	1–1
Marte Soyapango	2–1	2–1	2–0	4–1		1–1	0–0
San Rafael Cedros	3–4	2–1	1–1	4–1	1–3		2–1
Vendaval	1–2	1–2	2–1	2–1	0–1	1–1	

Updated to match(es) played on unknown. Source:
Legend: Blue = home team win; Yellow = draw; Red = away team win.

=== Group C ===
==== Results ====
Home \ Away	ASP	FIR	FSF	IND	JOC	ASU	PLA	TOP
Aspirante		1–2	3–1	0–0	0–1	1–1	1–1	2–0
Firpo	0–1		0–1	2–1	4–0	1–0	2–2	2–0
Fuerte San Francisco	2–3	2–2		1–0	0–1	2–1	1–1	1–2
Independiente F.C.	1–0	1–0	2–0		1–0	1–0	0–0	0–0
Jocoro	1–0	2–0	1–0	1–2		0–0	4–2	0–0
La Asunción	2–1	3–4	2–5	1–1	2–2		3–2	2–2
Platense	2–1	0–0	0–2	2–1	1–2	4–0		1–1
Topiltzín	2–0	3–2	2–2	1–2	0–0	2–2	3–1	

Updated to match(es) played on unknown. Source:
Legend: Blue = home team win; Yellow = draw; Red = away team win.

== Final Series ==
Quarterfinals
El Roble de Ilobasco	0	2	2
Jocoro F.C. (s)	0	2	2
FC San Rafael Cedros	4	3	7
Turin (s)	3	4	7
Topiltzín	0	1	1
Marte Soyapango	0	0	0
Firpo B	2	0	2
San Pablo FC	1	2	3
Rácing Jr	0	0	0
Independiente	0	1	1
Once Lobos	4	2	6
Compala	1	3	4
7
10
2
15

Semifinals
Jocoro F.C.	0	0	0
Turin	0	'1	1
Topiltzín	0	0	0
San Pablo FC (s)	0	0	0
Once Lobos (s)	0	1	1
Independiente	3	0	3

Preminilaryfinals
Turin	4	1	5
San Pablo FC	1	1	2
Independiente (s)	1	1	2
Once Lobos	1	1	2

Finals
Turin	1	0	1
Independiente	2	1	3

=== Finals ===
==== First leg ====
24 December 2016

Turin	1-2	Independiente
Jonathan Aguilar 23'		José Maldonado 52'; 63'

Estadio Las Delicias, Santa Tecla

==== Second leg ====
31 December 2016

Independiente	1-0	Turin
Farid Mancilla 60'		None

Estadio Jiboa, San Vicente
Referee: TBD

Independiente won 3-1 on aggregate.

Apertura 2016 champions

? title

=== Individual awards ===
Hombre GOL	Best Goalkeeper Award
(El Salvador) Marvin Medrano; San Rafael Cedros	(El Salvador) Luis Chamagua; Soyapango

== Clausura 2017 ==
=== Group A ===
==== Results ====
Home \ Away	APO	BRU	LEO	OLB	OMU	RAC	SAN	TUR
Atlético Apopa								
Brujos de Izalco								
Leones de Occidente								
Once Lobos								
Once Municipal								
Rácing Jr								
San Pablo								
Turin								

Updated to match(es) played on unknown. Source:
Legend: Blue = home team win; Yellow = draw; Red = away team win.

=== Group B ===
==== Results ====
Home \ Away	AUD	COM	ROB	MAR	SOY	SRC	VEN
Audaz							
Compala							
El Roble							
Marte							
Marte Soyapango							
San Rafael Cedros							
Vendaval							

Updated to match(es) played on unknown. Source:
Legend: Blue = home team win; Yellow = draw; Red = away team win.

=== Group C ===
==== Results ====
Home \ Away	ASP	FIR	FSF	IND	JOC	ASU	PLA	TOP
Aspirante								
Firpo								
Fuerte San Francisco								
Independiente F.C.								
Jocoro								
La Asunción								
Platense								
Topiltzín								

Updated to match(es) played on unknown. Source:
Legend: Blue = home team win; Yellow = draw; Red = away team win.

== Final Series ==
Quarterfinals
Once Lobos	1	1	2
FC San Rafael Cedros	0	0	0
C.D. La Asuncion	2	0	2
Compala	2	3	5
Audaz (s)	2	2	4
Fuerte San Francisco	2	2	4
Once Municipal (s)	0	1	1
Jocoro F.C.	0	1	1
Independiente (s)	2	2	4
San Pablo FC	3	1	4
Marte Soyapango	1	1	2
Turin	1	2	3
7
10
2
15

Semifinals
Once Lobos	1	3	4
Compala	0	3	3
Audaz (s)	1	0	1
Once Municipal	1	0	1
Independiente (s)	0	1	1
Turin	0	1	1

Preminilaryfinals
Once Lobos	0	2	2 (3)
C.D. Audaz	0	2	2 (4)
Independiente (s)	1	1	2
Once Municipal	2	0	2

Finals
C.D. Audaz	1	3	4
Independiente	1	0	1

=== Finals ===
==== First leg ====
28 May 2017

C.D. Audaz	1-1	Independiente
Víctor Durán 33'		José Pérez 90'

La Coyotera,

==== Second leg ====
4 May 2017

Independiente	0-3	Audaz
None		Santos Guzmán 31', Levy Martínez 66' and 76'

Estadio Vicentino, San Vicente
Referee: TBD

Audaz won 4-1 on aggregate.

Clausura 2017 champions

1st title

=== Individual awards ===
Hombre GOL	Best Goalkeeper Award
(Colombia) Andrés Vallecilla; Fuerte San Francisco	(El Salvador) Edwin Driotis; Independiente

== Relegation table ==
The three teams that finished last in their respective group would normally be relegated . However, all three teams will play a series of home and away games and only two will be relegated to the Tercera Division this season. Platense finished top and survived relegation. While Vendaval and Leones de Occidente were relegated.

Pos	Team	Pld	W	D	L	GF	GA	GD	Pts	(El Salvador) PLA	(El Salvador) VEN	(El Salvador) LEO
1	(El Salvador) Platense	4	3	1	0	12	4	+8	10		2–1	3–0
2	(El Salvador) Vendaval	3	1	1	1	8	4	+4	4	N/A		3–3
3	(El Salvador) Leones de Occidente	3	0	0	3	1	11	−10	0	0–4	1–4	
