= 2017–18 Segunda División de Fútbol Salvadoreño =

Segunda División de Fútbol Salvadoreño
- Season: 2017–18
- Champions: Apertura: Jocoro F.C., Clausura: Jocoro F.C.
- Promoted: TBD
- Relegated: UDET and San Rafael Cedros

The 2017–18 season (officially known as Liga de Plata and also as Torneo Luis Baltazar Ramírez) was El Salvador's Segunda División de Fútbol Salvadoreño. The season was split into two championships Apertura 2017 and Clausura 2018. The champions of the Apertura and Clausura play the direct promotion playoff every year. The winner of that series ascends to Primera División de Fútbol de El Salvador.

== Changes from the 2017-2018 seasons ==
Teams promoted to 2017–18 Primera División de Fútbol Profesional season

- Audaz

Teams relegated to Segunda División de Fútbol Salvadoreño - Apertura 2017

- UES

Teams relegated to Tercera División de Fútbol Profesional - Apertura 2017

- Leones de Occidente
- C.D. Vendaval

Teams promoted from Tercera Division De Fútbol Profesional - Apertura 2016

- Ilopaneco
- Chagüite
- UDET

New teams or teams that purchased a spot in the Segunda division

- El Vencedor (purchased the spot of Luis Angel Firpo B)
- C.D. Vendaval (originally relegated but bought the spot of Marte Soyapango for $12,000)

Teams that failed to register for the Apertura 2017

- UES (team de-registered due to not filing the right paperwork in time)
- Turin FESA (team de-registered due to not filing the right paperwork in time)
- Firpo B (sold their spot to Vencedor)
- Marte Soyapango (sold their spot to Vendaval)

=== Further changes ===
On January 17, 2018 Once Municipal was stripped of their footballing license due to unpaid fees to Segunda division and lack of payments to players and coaches.

== Team information ==
A total of 22 teams contested the league, including sides from the 2016–17 Segunda División and three promoted from the Tercera Division. Once Municipal was removed following the apertura season due to failure to pay the Segunda division.

Grupo A
| Team | Stadium | Capacity |
|---|---|---|
| Atl Apopa | | |
| Brujos de Izalco | | |
| Once Lobos | | |
| Ilopaneco | | |
| Rácing Jr | | |
| EF San Pablo Tacachico | | |

Grupo B
| Team | Stadium | Capacity |
|---|---|---|
| Atletico Comalapa | | |
| Atletico Marte | | |
| El Roble | | |
| Independiente | | |
| Platense | | |
| San Rafael Cedros | Estadio Anastacio Aquino | |
| Vendaval | | |

Grupo C
| Team | Stadium | Capacity |
|---|---|---|
| Aspirante | | |
| Chaguite | | |
| El Vencedor | Estadio German Rivas Lozano | |
| Fuerte San Francisco | Estadio Correcaminos | |
| Jocoro | Complejo Deportivo Tierra de Fuego | |
| La Asuncion | | |
| Topiltzin | | |
| UDET | | |

== Teams ==
| Team | Location | Stadium | Capacity | Manager | Captain | Kit sponsor | Primera Division affiliate or partnership |
|---|---|---|---|---|---|---|---|
| Atletico Apopa | Apopa, San Salvador | Estadio Municipal de Apopa | 5,000 | (El Salvador) Marcos Antonio Portillo | (El Salvador) | | |
| Atletico Marte | Ilopango | Estadio Azteca | 2,000 | (Argentina) Gabriel Alvarez | (El Salvador) | | Salguero |
| Aspirante | Jucuapa, Usulután | Estadio Municipal de Jucuapa | 3,000 | (Brazil) Eduardo Santana | (El Salvador) | | |
| C.D. Chagüite | Lolotiquillo, Morazan | Estadio Correcaminos | 2,000 | (El Salvador) Nelson Mauricio Ancheta | (El Salvador) | | |
| Brujos de Izalco | Izalco | Estadio Salvador Mariona | | (El Salvador) Juan Ramon Paredes | (El Salvador) | Katty Sport | Smart Office Business Center |
| Comalapa | Chalatenango | Estadio Municipal de Comalapa | | (Honduras) German Perez | (El Salvador) | Milan | Omnivision, Canal 22, Alcadia Municipal de Comalapa |
| El Roble | Ilobasco, Cabañas | Estadio Mauricio Vides | 4,000 | (El Salvador) Fausto Omar Vasquez | (El Salvador) | Katty Sport | Trasporte Duras, Capillas Ismael Guzman |
| El Vencedor | Santa Elena, Usulután | Estadio German Rivas | 5,000 | (El Salvador) Omar Sevilla | (El Salvador) | TBD | |
| Fuerte San Francisco | San Francisco Gotera, Morazan | Estadio Correcaminos | 12,000 | (El Salvador) Marvin Javier Hernández x | (El Salvador) | | |
| Independiente | San Vicente, San Vicente | Estadio Vicentino | 8,000 | (El Salvador) Ivan Ruiz | (El Salvador) | | Caja de Credito San Vicente, Injiboa |
| Jocoro | Jocoro, Morazan | Complejo Deportivo Tierra de Fuego | | (Uruguay) Ruben Alonso | (El Salvador) | | |
| La Asuncion | Anamoros, La Union | Estadio Jose Eliseo Reyes | 5,000 | (El Salvador) Juan Francisco Najarro x | (El Salvador) TBD | | MAXH3, |
| Ilopaneco | Ilopango, San Salvador | Cancha del Estadio Azteca | 8,000 | (El Salvador) Guillermo Rivera | (El Salvador) | | Sil Va, La cancha loca, Transportes guara |
| Vendaval | Apopa, San Salvador | Estadio Joaquín Gutierrez | 5,000 | (Chile) Hector Jara | (El Salvador) | | |
| Once Lobos | Chalchuapa, Santa Ana | Estadio Once Lobos | 2,000 | (El Salvador) Jorge Molina | (El Salvador) | | Zona Franco |
| Once Municipal | Ahuachapan, Ahuachapán | Estadio Simeon Magana | 5,000 | (El Salvador) N/A | (El Salvador) N/A | N/A | N/A |
| Platense | Zacatecoluca, La Paz | Estadio Antonio Toledo Valle | 10,000 | (Brazil) Eraldo Correia | (El Salvador) | | |
| Rácing Jr | Armenia, Sonsonate | Estadio 21 de Noviembre | | (El Salvador) Wilber Aguilar x | (El Salvador) | | |
| EF San Pablo Tacachico | San Pablo Tacachico, La Libertad | Cancha Municipal Valle Meza | | (Uruguay) Pablo Quiñones | (El Salvador) | | |
| San Rafael Cedros | San Rafael Cedros, Cuscatlan | Estadio Anastacio Aquino | | (El Salvador) | (El Salvador) | | |
| Topiltzin | Jiquilisco, Usulután | Estadio Topiltzin de Jiquilisco | 5,000 | (El Salvador) Jorge Abrego | (El Salvador) | | |
| UDET | El Tránsito, San Miguel | Estadio César Ángulo | 5,000 | (El Salvador) Victor Fuentes | (El Salvador) | | |

Affiliate
Partnership

== Managerial changes ==
| Team | Outgoing manager | Manner of departure | Date of vacancy | Replaced by | Date of appointment | Position in table |
Pre-apertura changes
| Platense | (El Salvador) Mario Martinez | Resigned | 2017 | (El Salvador) Juan Ramon Paredes | 2017 | th |
| Atletico Marte | (El Salvador) Luis Guevara Mora | Resigned | 2016 | (Argentina) Gabriel Alvarez | 2016 | th |
| Vendaval | (El Salvador) Francisco Hernandez | Resigned | 2016 | (El Salvador) Carlos Mauricio Sortelo | 2016 | th |
| San Pablo | (El Salvador) Juan Ramon Paredes | Resigned | 2016 | (Uruguay) Pablo Quiñones | 2016 | th |
| San Rafael Cedros | (El Salvador) Bairon Ernesto Garcia | Resigned | 2016 | (El Salvador) William Osorio | 2016 | th |
Apertura changes
| Independiente | (Uruguay) Ruben Alonso | Resigned to become coach of Sonsonate | August 2017 | (El Salvador) Edgar Henríquez | August 2017 | th |
| C.D. Vendaval | (El Salvador) Carlos Mauricio Sortelo | Sacked | August 2017 | (Chile) Hector Jara | August 2017 | th |
| El Vencedor | (El Salvador) TBD | Sacked | September 2017 | (El Salvador) Mario Martinez | September 2017 | th |
| Platense | (El Salvador) Juan Ramon Paredes | Sacked | September 2017 | (El Salvador) Afrodicio Valladares | September 2017 | th |
| El Vencedor | (El Salvador) Mario Martinez | Sacked | September 2017 | (El Salvador) Omar Sevilla | October 2017 | th |
| San Rafael Cedros | (El Salvador) William Osorio | Sacked | September 2017 | (El Salvador) German Rodriguez | September 2017 | th |
| San Rafael Cedros | (El Salvador) German Rodriguez | Resigned | September 2017 | (El Salvador) Samuel "El Burro" Arias | October 2017 | th |
| Once Lobos | (El Salvador) Cesar Acevedo | Resigned | September 2017 | (El Salvador) Jorge Molina | October 2017 | th |
| C.D. Aspirante | (El Salvador) Victor Giron | Sacked | September 2017 | (Brazil) Eduardo Santana | October 2017 | th |
| Chagüite | (El Salvador) Ciro Emigdio Romero | Sacked | October 2017 | (Honduras) Efrain Nunez | October 2017 | th |
Pre-clausura changes
| Platense | (El Salvador) Afrodicio Valladares | Resigned | 2017 | (El Salvador) Omar Pimentel | 2017 | th |
| Once Municipal | (El Salvador) Ivan Ruiz | Resigned | 2017 | (El Salvador) Ernesto Iraheta | 2017 | th |
| Racing Jr | (El Salvador) Wilber Aguilar | Resigned | 2017 | (El Salvador) Enzo Artiga | 2017 | th |
| UDET | (El Salvador) Miguel Aguilar Obando | Resigned | 2017 | (El Salvador) Erazmo Lazo | 2017 | th |
| Atlético Comalapa | (El Salvador) Jorge Abrego | Resigned | 2017 | (Honduras) German Perez | 2017 | th |
| Topiltzin | (El Salvador) Sebastien Hernandez | Sacked | December 2017 | (El Salvador) Jorge Abrego | January 2018 | th |
| Independiente | (El Salvador) Edgar Henríquez | Resigned | December 2017 | (El Salvador) Ivan Ruiz | December 2017 | th |
| Brujos de Izalco | (El Salvador) Marcelo Escalante | Resigned | 2017 | (El Salvador) Juan Ramon Paredes | 2017 | th |
| San Rafael Cedros | (El Salvador) Samual Arias | Resigned | 2017 | (El Salvador) Ángel Orellana | 2017 | th |
Clausura changes
| El Roble | (El Salvador) Victor Coreas | Resigned | Jan 2018 | (El Salvador) Fausto Omar Vásquez | Jan 2018 | th |
| San Rafael Cedros | (El Salvador) Ángel Orellana | Resigned to become head coach of Barillas | Jan 2018 | (El Salvador) | Jan 2018 | th |
| Chaguite | (Honduras) Efrain Nunez | Resigned | Feb 2018 | (El Salvador) Nelson Mauricio Ancheta | Feb 2018 | th |
| Platense | (El Salvador) Omar Pimentel | Resigned | March 2018 | (Brazil) Eraldo Correia | March 2018 | th |
| Jocoro FC | (El Salvador) Carlos Romero | Resigned, to become Audaz | March 2018 | (Uruguay) Ruben Alonso | March 2018 | th |

== Apertura ==
=== Final series ===
First round
1A | EF San Pablo Municipal (s) | 2 | 3 | 5
4B | Atlético Marte | 0 | 0 | 0
Best Loser
of First round
1B | CD El Roble (s) | 2 | 2 | 4
4C | CD La Asunción | 0 | 1 | 1
2A | CD Brujos Mario Calvo (s) | 1 | 2 | 3
3C | CD UDET | 0 | 0 | 0
1C | Jocoro FC (s) | 1 | 2 | 3
4A | CD Once Lobos | 1 | 1 | 2
2° Best Loser
of First round
2B | Independiente FC (s) | 0 | 2 | 2
3A | CD Once Municipal | 4 | 1 | 5
2C | CD Fuerte San Francisco (s) | 2 | 2 | 4
3B | CD Atlético Comalapa | 2 | 1 | 3

Quarterfinals
1A | EF San Pablo Municipal (s) | 2 | 1 | 3
2B | Independiente FC | 3 | 0 | 1 pen.
1B | CD El Roble (s) | 1 | 3 | 4
2A | CD Brujos Mario Calvo | 1 | 1 | 2
1C | Jocoro FC (s) | 1 | 2 | 3
3B | CD Atlético Comalapa | 0 | 0 | 0
3A | CD Once Municipal (s) | 0 | 1 | 7
2C | CD Fuerte San Francisco | 1 | 0 | 6 pen.

Semifinals
1A | EF San Pablo Municipal | 1 | 0 | 1
1B | CD El Roble (s) | 0 | 2 | 2
1C | Jocoro FC (s) | 2 | 5 | 7
2C | CD Fuerte San Francisco | 1 | 5 | 6

Finals
1B | CD El Roble (s) | 1 | 2 | 3
1C | Jocoro FC | 3 | 1 | 4

=== Semifinals ===
May 23, 2017

| San Pablo Municipal | 1-0 | El Roble |
|---|---|---|
| TBD 72' | | None |

May 31, 2017

| El Roble | 2-0 | San Pablo Municipal |
|---|---|---|
| Cristian David 54'; Aquiles Méndez 68' |

Estadio Mauricio Vides, Ilobasco

El Roble won 2-1 on aggregate.

May 23, 2017

| Fuerte San Francisco | 1-2 | Jocoro F.C. |
|---|---|---|
| TBD 13'; TBD 33' | | TBD 62' |

Estadio Correcaminos, Morazan
May 30, 2017

| Jocoro F.C. | 5-5 | Fuerte San Francisco |
|---|---|---|
| Gregory Costly 15' 30' 43'; David Hernández 27'; Édgar Cruz 85' | | Adolfo Miranda 16' 79'; René Granados 42'; Adilson Romero 65'; Kevin Ventura 87' |

Complejo deportivo Tierra de Fuego, Morazán

Jocoro won 7-6 on aggregate.

=== Finals ===
==== First leg ====
9 December 2017

| Jocoro F.C. | 3-1 | El Roble |
|---|---|---|
| Yuvini Salamanca 2', Édgar Cruz 46', Christopher Galeas 78' | | Neymer Miranda 39' |

Complejo Deportivo Tierra de Fuego, Morazán
Attendance: 1,242

==== Second leg ====
17 December 2017

| El Roble | 2-1 | Jocoro F.C. |
|---|---|---|
| José Luis Amaya 76'; Cristian Gil 86' | | Christopher Galeas 2' |

Estadio Mauricio Vides, Ilobasco
Referee: TBD

Jocoro FC won 4-3 on aggregate.

Apertura 2017 champions

1st title

=== Individual awards ===
| Hombre GOL | Best Goalkeeper Award |
|---|---|
| (El Salvador) César Larios; San Pablo | (El Salvador) Felipe Amaya; Fuerte San Francisco |

== Clausura ==
=== Round of 16 ===
April 1, 2018

| C.D. Chagüite | 0-1 | Atlético Comalapa |
|---|---|---|
| None | | Victor Fuentes 73' |

Estadio Correcaminos
April 8, 2017
3:00 pm

| Atlético Comalapa | 1 -3 | C.D. Chagüite |
|---|---|---|
| TBD 54' | [ ] | Andres Vallecillas 54', Carlos Reina 54', Emerson Gomes 54' |

Estadio Municipal de Comalapa, Chalatenango

Chagüite won 3-2 on aggregate.

March 31, 2018

| Independiente | 0-1 | Brujos de Izalco |
|---|---|---|
| None | | José Chávez 82' |

Estadio Vicente
April 8, 2018
3:00pm

| Brujos de Izalco | 1-2 | Independiente |
|---|---|---|
| TBD 54' | [ ] | Hector Osorio 54'; 54' |

Esatdio Salvador Mariona, Izalco

2-2 draw on aggregate, Brujos de Izalco won 5-4 on penalties.

April 1, 2018

| San Pablo Municipal | 2-2 | C.D. Topiltzin |
|---|---|---|
| Óscar Acevedo 59'; Ever Ávila 78' | | TBD 72'; Luis Orrego 92' |

Cancha Municipal Valle Meza
April 8, 2018
3:00 pm

| C.D. Topiltzin | 2-0 | San Pablo Municipal |
|---|---|---|
| Denys Ordoñez 28'; Guillermo Garcia 34' | [ ] | None |

Estadio Topiltzin de Jiquilisco

Topiltzin won 4-2 on aggregate.

March 29, 2017
3:00 pm

| El Vencedor | 2-1 | Ilopaneco |
|---|---|---|
| Iván Machado 44'; José Torres 55' | | Ronald Padilla 69' |

Estadio German Rivas Lozano
April 8, 2017
10:30am

| Ilopaneco | 2-1 | El Vencedor |
|---|---|---|
| Nelson Ascensio 57'; Ostmaro Orellana 77' | [ ] | John Machado 43' |

Estadio Azteca Ilopango, San Salvador

3-3 on aggregate. El Vencedor won 2-1 on penalties.

March 31, 2018
3:00pm

| El Roble | 2-3 | Jocoro F.C. |
|---|---|---|
| Neymar Miranda 24'; Cristian Gil 45' | | Gregorly Costly 19'; Bryan Zuniga 42'; David Hernández 72' |

Estadio Mauricio Videz
April 7, 2018
3:30 pm

| Jocoro F.C. | 2-1 | El Roble |
|---|---|---|
| Yuvini Salamanca 56'; Bryan Zuniga 54' | [ ] | Aquiles Mendez 10' |

Complejo Deportivo Tierra de Fuego, Morazan

Jocoro F.C. won 5-3 on aggregate.

March 29, 2018

| Racing Jr | 2-0 | Atletico Marte |
|---|---|---|
| Diego Martinez 72'; Jonathan Nolasco 72' | | None |

Estadio 21 de Noviembre
April 7, 2017
3:00pm

| Atletico Marte | 1-0 | Racing Jr |
|---|---|---|
| Jairo Martinez 37' | [ ] | None |

Estadio Cuscatlan

Racing Jnr won 2-1 on aggregate.

=== Quarterfinals ===
The best two loser teams in the round of 16 will advance to the quarter-finals, the teams were Ilopaneco and Independiente.

April 15, 2018
10:30 am

| Ilopaneco | 1-0 | Brujos de Izalco |
|---|---|---|
| Guillermo Orellana 72' | | None |

Estadio Azteca, Ilopango
April 22, 2018
3:00 pm

| Brujos de Izalco | 2-0 | Ilopaneco |
|---|---|---|
| Carlos Martinez 54'; Bryan Gil 54' | [ ] | None |

Estadio Salvador Mariona, Izalco

Brujos de Izalco won 2-1 on aggregate.

April 15, 2018
3:00 pm

| El Vencedor | 1-1 | C.D. Chagüite |
|---|---|---|
| Elías Cubero 21' | | Kevin Marquez 72' |

Estadio Jose German Rivas
April 22, 2018
3:00 pm

| C.D. Chagüite | 2-1 | El Vencedor |
|---|---|---|
| Fidel Lazo 54'; Gilfredo Gonzalez 54' | [ ] | 54' |

Estadio Correcaminos, San Francisco Gotera

Chagüite won 3-2 on aggregate.

April 15, 2018
3:00pm

| Independiente | 1-0 | C.D. Topiltzin |
|---|---|---|
| Andy Mendoza 47' | | None |

Estadio Vicentino
April 22, 2018
3:00 pm

| C.D. Topiltzin | 3-2 | Independiente |
|---|---|---|
| Hugo Alejo 54' 54'; Luis Orrego 54' | [ ] | Diego Palacios 54'; Álex Arias 54' |

Estadio Topiltzin de Jiquilisco, Usulutan

3-3, Independiente won 6-5 on penalties.

April 15, 2018
3:00 pm

| Racing Jr | 0-2 | Jocoro F.C. |
|---|---|---|
| None | | Bryan Zúniga 72'; Edgard Cruz 72' |

Estadio 21 Noviembre
April 21, 2018
3:30 pm

| Jocoro F.C. | 3-0 | Racing Jr |
|---|---|---|
| Christopher Galeas 54' 54'; Édgar Cruz 54' | | None |

Complejo Deportivo Tierra de Fuego, Morazon

Jocoro F.C. won 5-0 on aggregate.

=== Semifinals ===
April 28, 2018
3:00pm

| C.D. Chagüite | 1-0 | Brujos de Izalco |
|---|---|---|
| Roberto Carlos Sol 33' | | None |

Estadio Correcaminos, San Francisco Gotera
May 6, 2018
3:00pm

| Brujos de Izalco | 3-0 | C.D. Chagüite |
|---|---|---|
| Bryan Gil 62' 82' 94' | | None |

Estadio Salvador Mariona de Izalco

Brujos de Izalco won 3-1 on aggregate.

April 29, 2018
3:00pm

| Independiente | 1-1 | Jocoro F.C. |
|---|---|---|
| Alfredo Hernández 21' | | Edgar Cruz 36' |

Estadio Vicentino, San Vicente
May 5, 2018

| Jocoro F.C. | 1-0 | Independiente |
|---|---|---|
| Yuvini Salamanca 88' | | None |

Complejo Municipal Tierra de Fuego

Jocoro FC won 2-1 on aggregate.

=== Final ===
==== First leg ====
13 May 2018

| Jocoro F.C. | 3-1 | Brujos de Izalco |
|---|---|---|
| Christopher Galeas 17' 65'; Brayan Zúniga 39' | | Christian Gil Mosquera 76' |

Estadio “Tierra de fuego”
Morazan
Attendance: TBD

==== Second leg ====
19 May 2018

| Brujos de Izalco | 2-3 | Jocoro F.C. |
|---|---|---|
| José Rivera 40'; Bryan Gil 48' | | David Hernandez 8'; Gregorio Costly 82'; Bryan Zúniga 86' |

Estadio Salvador Mariona de Izalco
Referee: TBD

Jocoro won 6-3 on aggregate.

Clausura champions

2nd title

=== Individual awards ===
| Hombre GOL | Best Goalkeeper Award |
|---|---|
| (El Salvador) Luis Canales (16 goals); Atletico Marte | (El Salvador) TBD; TBD |

== Relegation table ==
The three teams that finished last in their respective group would normally be relegated . However, all three teams played a series of home and away games and only two were relegated to the Tercera Division this season. Apopa finished top and survived relegation. UDET and San Rafael Cedros were relegated.

| Team | Pld | W | D | L | GF | GA | GD | Pts | APO | UDET | SRC |
|---|---|---|---|---|---|---|---|---|---|---|---|
| (El Salvador) Apopa | 3 | 2 | 1 | 0 | 4 | 2 | +2 | 7 | | 1–1 | N/A |
| (El Salvador) UDET (R) | 4 | 1 | 2 | 1 | 8 | 5 | +3 | 5 | 0–1 | | 4–0 |
| (El Salvador) San Rafael Cedros (R) | 3 | 0 | 1 | 2 | 4 | 9 | −5 | 1 | 1–2 | 3–3 | |

(R) Relegated
