= 2015–16 Segunda División de Fútbol Salvadoreño =

Segunda División de Fútbol Salvadoreño
- Season: 2015–16
- Champions: Apertura: Limeno, Clausura: Limeno
- Promoted: Limeno
- Relegated: C.D. Brasilia (Group A), Atl Balboa (Group B)

The 2015–16 season (officially known as Liga de Plata and also as Torneo Luis Baltazar Ramírez) will be El Salvador's Segunda División de Fútbol Salvadoreño The season will be split into two championships Apertura 2015 and Clausura 2016. The champions of the Apertura and Clausura play the direct promotion playoff every year. The winner of that series ascends to Primera División de Fútbol de El Salvador.

== Team information ==
A total of 23 teams will contest the league, including sides from the 2014–15 Segunda División and 3 promoted from the Tercera Division.

with the increase of 4 teams from the previous edition, teams from lower level could apply to join the league and would be judged based on facility, fans, locations and if they purchase a 10,000 or 15, 000 dollars license

== Changes from the 2014-2015 seasons ==
Teams promoted to Primera División de Fútbol Profesional - Apertura 2015

- Real Destroyer (However sold their spot to Sonsonate and will return to Segunda Division)

Teams relegated to Segunda División de Fútbol Salvadoreño - Apertura 2015

- None

Teams relegated to Tercera División de Fútbol Profesional - Apertura 2015

- C.D. Liberal

Teams promoted from Tercera Division De Fútbol Profesional - Apertura 2015

- Fuerte San Francisco

New Teams or teams that purchased a spot in the Segunda division

- Leones de Occidente (Bought their spot from Guadalupano)
- C.D. Brasilia (Originally relegated from the tercera division, however they purchased a spot in the segunda division)
- Toros F.C. (Bought their spot from Atletico Marte)
- Independiente F.C. (El Salvador) (purchased a spot in the segunda division)
- EF San Pablo Tacachico (purchased a spot in the segunda division)
- Atlético Apopa (purchased a spot in the segunda division)
- FC San Rafael Cedros (Bought their spot from Turin FESA)
- Quequeisque (Bought their spot from Real Destroyer)

Teams that failed to register for the Apertura 2015

- C.D. Chalatenango (Purchased a spot in the primera division and didn't sell or create a team to fill the spot)
- Atletico Marte (originally relegated from the primera division, however they purchased a spot in the primera division)
- C.D. Guadalupano (Sold their spot to Leones de Metapan)
- Sonsonate (Purchased the spot of Real Destroyer in the primera division)
- Turin FESA (Sold their spot to San Rafael Cedros)
- Real Destroyer (sold and dissolved to join Quequeispeque)

== Stadia and locations ==
The following 23 clubs will compete in the Segunda División de Fútbol Salvadoreño during the 2015–2016 season:

Location of teams in Apertura 2015/Clausura 2016

Club	City	Stadium	Capacity
Atlético Comalapa	Chalatenango	Estadio Municipal de Comalapa	TBD
Aspirante	Jucuapa	Estadio Municipal de Jucuapa/Estadio Nuveo Municipal Guadalupe	TBD
Audaz	Apastepeque	Estadio La Cototera	5,000
Atletico Balboa	La Unión	Estadio Marcelino Imbers	4,000
El Roble	Ilobasco	Estadio Mauricio Vides	4,000
Firpo	Usulután	Estadio Sergio Torres	5,000
Fuerte San Francisco	San Francisco Gotera, Morazán	Estadio Correcaminos	12,000
La Asunción	Anamorós	Complejo Deportivo Jose Eliseo Reyes	TBD
Leones de Occidente	Metapán	Complejo Deportivo de Metapan	TBD
Marte Soyapango	Soyapango	Cancha Jorgito Melendez	TBD
Municipal Limeno	Santa Rosa de Lima, La Unión	Estadio Ramon Flores Berrios	5,000
Once Lobos	Chalchuapa	Estadio Once Lobos	8,000
Once Municipal	Ahuachapán	Estadio Arturo Simeon Magana	5,000
Platense	Zacatecoluca, La Paz	Estadio Antonio Toledo Valle	10,000
Topiltzin	Jiquilisco	Estadio Topiltzin de Jiquilisco	5,000
FC San Rafael Cedros	TBD	Estadio Anastasio Aquino	5,000
Vendaval	Apopa	Estadio Joaquin Gutierrez Apopa	5,000
Toros F.C.	Concepción Batres	Complejo Deportivo de Concepcion Batres	TBD
Independiente F.C.	San Vicente	Estadio Vicentino	8,000
Brasilia	Suchitoto	Estadio Municipal de Suchitoto	3,000
EF San Pablo Tacachico	San Pablo Tacachico	Cancha Municipal Valle Meza	TBD
Atlético Apopa	Apopa	Estadio Joaquin Gutierrez Apopa	5,000
Quequeisque	Nuevo San Salvador	Estadio Las Delicias	10,443

== Apertura ==
=== Personnel and sponsoring ===
Team	Manager^{1}	Chairman	Team captain	Kit Manufacturer	Sponsor
Atlético Comalapa	(El Salvador) Mauricio Alfaro	(El Salvador)	(El Salvador)		
C.D. Aspirante	(El Salvador) Mauro Parada	(El Salvador)	(El Salvador)		
Audaz	(El Salvador) Miguel Ángel Soriano	(El Salvador)	(El Salvador)	None	None
Atletico Balboa	(Colombia) Luis Carlos Asprilla	(El Salvador)	(El Salvador)		
El Roble	(El Salvador) Victor Giron	(El Salvador)	(El Salvador)		
Firpo	(El Salvador) Alvaro Misael Alfaro	(El Salvador)	(El Salvador)		RIA, Now Sport, Dial FM, Vitasym
Fuerte San Francisco	(El Salvador) Marvin Javier Hernandez	(El Salvador)	(El Salvador)		
C.D. La Asunción	(El Salvador) Angel Orellana	(El Salvador)	(El Salvador)		
Leones de Occidente	(El Salvador) Edwin Portillo	(El Salvador)	(El Salvador)		
C.D. Marte Soyapango	(El Salvador) Juan Ramón Paredes	(El Salvador)	(El Salvador)		
C.D. Municipal Limeno	(El Salvador) Carlos Romero	(El Salvador)	(El Salvador)	Milan (Jaguar Sportic)	Innova Sport, Santa Rosa de Limeno
Once Lobos	(El Salvador) Ivan Ruiz	(El Salvador)	(El Salvador)	Galaxia	Alba, Galaxia
Once Municipal	(El Salvador) Giovanni Trigueros	(El Salvador)	(El Salvador)	None	La Geo, Innovas port
C.D. Platense Municipal Zacatecoluca	(El Salvador) Eduardo Lara Moscote	(El Salvador)	(El Salvador)	None	
Quequeisque	(El Salvador) Jorge Calles	(El Salvador)	(El Salvador)	VCE	Mega Mov
C.D. Topiltzin	(El Salvador) Mauricio Amaya	(El Salvador)	(El Salvador)		
FC San Rafael Cedros	(El Salvador)	(El Salvador)	(El Salvador)		
C.D. Vendaval	(El Salvador) Carlos Orellana	(El Salvador)	(El Salvador)		
Toros F.C.	(El Salvador) Miguel Aguilar Obando	(El Salvador)	(El Salvador)	Milan	Grupo Radial Samix, JuanVolves
EF San Pablo Tacachico	(El Salvador) Efrain Burgos	(El Salvador)	(El Salvador)		
C.D. Brasilia	(El Salvador) Raul Danilo Castillo	(El Salvador)	(El Salvador)		
Atlético Apopa	(El Salvador) Marcos Antonio Portillo	(El Salvador)	(El Salvador)		
Independiente F.C.	(El Salvador) Ricardo Garcia	(El Salvador)	(El Salvador)		INUBOA

==== Grupo Centro Occidente ====
Pos	Team	Pld	W	D	L	GF	GA	GD	Pts	Qualification
1	Comalapa (Q)	20	11	9	0	26	8	+18	42	Qualification for playoffs
2	Once Lobos (Q)	20	11	8	1	39	21	+18	41	Qualification for playoffs
3	San Pablo Tacachico (Q)	20	10	2	8	39	32	+7	32	Qualification for playoffs
4	Vendaval (Q)	20	6	12	2	29	21	+8	30	Qualification for playoffs
5	El Roble (Q)	20	8	5	7	32	25	+7	29	Qualification for playoffs
6	Once Municipal (Q)	20	8	4	8	29	27	+2	28	Qualification for playoffs
7	Brasilia (Q)	20	6	4	10	21	29	−8	22	Qualification for playoffs
8	Apopa (Q)	20	6	4	10	27	36	−9	22	Qualification for playoffs
9	Marte Soyapango	20	6	2	12	28	38	−10	20	
10	Quequesique	20	5	5	10	16	26	−10	20	
11	Leones	20	2	7	11	30	52	−22	13	

(Q) Qualified for the phase indicated

Home \ Away	APO	BRA	COM	ROB	LEO	SOY	OLB	OMU	QUE	SAN	VEN
Apopa		2–0	0–2	2–1	4–1	2–1	1–1	1–3	1–0	2–3	1–3
Brasilia	2–2		1–3	1–4	1–1	3–0	1–1	2–3	1–0	1–2	1–1
Comalapa	3–2	2–0		1–0	6–1	1–0	0–0	1–0	0–0	1–1	0–0
El Roble	1–0	0–1	1–1		2–2	2–0	1–2	1–1	5–0	2–1	0–0
Leones	2–3	1–2	1–2	2–2		3–2	1–3	1–1	1–2	3–1	1–1
Marte Soyapango	3–0	0–1	0–0	1–3	4–3		3–0	2–0	1–0	5–3	2–2
Once Lobos	4–2	4–2	0–0	2–0	2–2	3–0		2–0	2–0	2–1	0–0
Once Municipal	2–0	1–1	0–1	2–4	2–1	5–1	1–3		2–0	4–0	1–1
Quequeisque	0–0	0–1	0–0	2–0	2–2	3–1	1–3	1–0		1–2	1–1
San Pablo Tacachico	3–1	1–0	0–1	3–1	6–0	2–1	2–2	4–0	1–2		3–0
Vendaval	1–1	2–0	1–1	1–2	4–1	2–1	3–3	1–1	2–1	3–0	

Legend: Blue = home team win; Yellow = draw; Red = away team win.

==== Grupo Centro Oriente ====
Pos	Team	Pld	W	D	L	GF	GA	GD	Pts	Qualification
1	L.Á. Firpo (Q)	22	16	4	2	44	18	+26	52	Qualification for playoffs
2	Municipal Limeño (Q)	22	11	4	7	26	17	+9	37	Qualification for playoffs
3	Audaz (Q)	22	9	7	6	24	21	+3	34	Qualification for playoffs
4	Independiente (Q)	22	8	9	5	29	21	+8	33	Qualification for playoffs
5	Fuerte San Francisco (Q)	22	8	9	5	30	26	+4	33	Qualification for playoffs
6	Topiltzín (Q)	22	9	4	9	37	33	+4	31	Qualification for playoffs
7	Atletico Balboa (Q)	22	8	6	8	33	30	+3	30	Qualification for playoffs
8	Toros (Q)	22	7	7	8	22	28	−6	28	Qualification for playoffs
9	Platense	22	6	7	9	22	32	−10	25	
10	Aspirante	22	7	3	12	23	34	−11	24	
11	FC San Rafael Cedros	22	5	4	13	32	51	−19	19	
12	La Asunción	22	4	4	14	29	38	−9	16	

(Q) Qualified for the phase indicated

Home \ Away	ASP	AUD	BAL	IND	ASU	FIR	FSF	MLI	PLA	SRC	TOP	TOR
Aspirante		0–0	1–0	1–3	2–0	0–3	1–1	2–3	1–0	2–1	1–4	2–1
Audaz	2–1		3–2	2–3	1–0	0–0	1–0	1–0	0–0	3–2	0–2	3–0
Atlético Balboa	2–1	5–2		1–1	0–1	1–3	0–0	0–0	2–1	3–0	1–4	3–0
Independiente F.C.	2–0	0–0	1–1		1–0	1–2	0–0	3–1	1–2	3–0	1–0	1–1
La Asunción	4–1	0–0	2–3	2–3		1–2	0–1	2–4	3–4	1–2	3–2	1–2
Firpo	2–0	3–0	4–2	2–2	1–0		3–2	1–0	1–0	4–1	3–0	0–0
Fuerte San Francisco	0–0	0–1	1–2	1–0	3–2	2–2		1–0	0–1	3–3	2–0	0–0
Municipal Limeño	1–0	1–0	2–0	2–1	0–0	1–0	0–1		3–0	0–1	3–0	2–1
Platense	1–0	0–4	1–1	1–1	1–1	1–2	3–4	0–0		3–2	1–1	0–0
San Rafael Cederos	2–3	2–1	3–1	1–1	2–2	2–4	2–2	1–2	0–1		2–4	2–3
Topiltzín	0–2	0–0	2–4	1–0	3–1	2–1	2–2	1–1	3–1	5–0		1–3
Toros F.C.	3–2	0–0	1–1	0–0	0–3	0–2	2–3	1–0	2–0	0–1	1–0	

Legend: Blue = home team win; Yellow = draw; Red = away team win.

== Final Series ==
=== Apertura ===
Quarterfinals
1A	Atletico Comalapa	1	2	3(4)
8B	Toros F.C.	3	0	3 (5)
2A	Once Lobos	1	6	7
7B	Atletico Balboa	0	0	0
3A	San Pablo FC	1	5 (a.e.t.)	6 (3)
6B	Topiltzín	4	2(a.e.t.)	6 (4)
4A	Vendaval	1	1	2
5B	Fuerte San Francisco	2	2	4
1B	Firpo	6	3	9
8A	Brasilia	0	1	1
2B	Municipal Limeno	0	4	'4
7A	Atlético Apopa	1	1	2
3B	Audaz	0	0	0
6A	Once Municipal	1	0	1
4B	Independiente	0	1	1
5A	El Roble	0	0	0

Semifinals
8B	Toros F.C.	1	2	3 (4)
2A	Once Lobos	0	3	3 (5)
6B	Topiltzín	0	0	0
5B	Fuerte San Francisco	2	0	2
1B	Firpo	0	3 (a.e.t.)	3 (2)
2B	Municipal Limeno	2	1 (a.e.t.)	3 (3)
6A	Once Municipal	0	0	0
4B	Independiente	1	0	1

Preminilaryfinals
2A	Once Lobos	1	0	1 (1)
5B	Fuerte San Francisco	0	1	1 (3)
2B	Municipal Limeno	1	2 (a.e.t.)	3 (a.e.t.)
4B	Independiente	2	0	2

Finals
5B	Fuerte San Francisco	1	1	2
2B	Municipal Limeno	3	1	4

=== Finals ===
==== First leg ====
20 December 2015

Municipal Limeno	3-1	Fuerte San Francisco
Misael Contreras 74'; Írving Flores 88'; Christopher Galeas 92'		Francisco Valladares 6'

Estadio Jose Ramon Flores, Santa Rosa de Lima

==== Second leg ====
27 December 2015

Fuerte San Francisco	1-1	Municipal Limeno
Andrés Urrego 24'		Luis Ríos 86'

Estadio Correcaminos, San Francisco Gotera
Attendance: 4, 000
Referee: TBD

Municipal Limeno won 4-2 on aggregate.

Apertura 2015 champions

4th title

=== Individual awards ===
Hombre GOL	Best Coach Award	Best Goalkeeper Award
(Colombia) Cristiam Gil Mosquera; Topiltzin	(El Salvador) TBD; TBD	(El Salvador) Rafael Serrano Lucha; Atletico Comalapa

== Clausura ==
=== Personnel and sponsoring ===
Team	Manager^{1}	Chairman	Team captain	Kit Manufacturer	Sponsor
Atlético Comalapa	(Uruguay) Pablo Quiñonez x	(El Salvador)	(El Salvador)		
C.D. Aspirante	(Colombia) Luis Carlos Asprilla x	(El Salvador)	(El Salvador)		
Audaz	(El Salvador) Jorge Calles x	(El Salvador)	(El Salvador)	None	None
Atletico Balboa	(Argentina) Andres Tabares x	(El Salvador)	(El Salvador)		
El Roble	(El Salvador) Fausto Vasquez x	(El Salvador)	(El Salvador)		
Firpo	(El Salvador) David Ramirez x	(El Salvador)	(El Salvador)		RIA, Now Sport, Dial FM, Vitasym
Fuerte San Francisco	(El Salvador) Sergio Munoz x	(El Salvador)	(El Salvador)		
C.D. La Asunción	(El Salvador) Juan Ramón Trejo x	(El Salvador)	(El Salvador)		
Leones de Occidente	(El Salvador) Samuel Maldonado x	(El Salvador)	(El Salvador)		
C.D. Marte Soyapango	(El Salvador) Juan Ramón Paredes x	(El Salvador)	(El Salvador)		
C.D. Municipal Limeno	(El Salvador) Carlos Romero x	(El Salvador)	(El Salvador)	Milan (Jaguar Sportic)	Innova Sport, Santa Rosa de Limeno
Once Lobos	(El Salvador) Ivan Ruiz x	(El Salvador)	(El Salvador)	Galaxia	Alba, Galaxia
Once Municipal	(El Salvador) Giovanni Trigueros x	(El Salvador)	(El Salvador)	None	La Geo, Innovas port
C.D. Platense Municipal Zacatecoluca	(El Salvador) Eduardo Lara Moscote x	(El Salvador)	(El Salvador)	None	
Quequeisque	(El Salvador) Mauricio Alfaro x	(El Salvador)	(El Salvador)	VCE	Mega Mov
C.D. Topiltzin	(El Salvador) Sebastián Hernández x	(El Salvador)	(El Salvador)		
FC San Rafael Cedros	(Honduras) German Rodriguez x	(El Salvador)	(El Salvador)		
C.D. Vendaval	(El Salvador) Carlos Orellana x	(El Salvador)	(El Salvador)		
Toros F.C.	(El Salvador) Carlos Mario Joya x	(El Salvador)	(El Salvador)	Milan	Grupo Radial Samix, JuanVolves
EF San Pablo Tacachico	(El Salvador) Miguel Angel Soriano x	(El Salvador)	(El Salvador)		
C.D. Brasilia	(El Salvador) Oscar Martinez x	(El Salvador)	(El Salvador)		
Atlético Apopa	(El Salvador) Marcos Antonio Portillo x	(El Salvador)	(El Salvador)		
Independiente F.C.	(El Salvador) Ricardo Garcia x	(El Salvador)	(El Salvador)		INUBOA

== Managerial changes ==
=== Before the start of the season ===
Team	Outgoing manager	Manner of departure	Date of vacancy	Replaced by	Date of appointment	Position in table
TBD	(El Salvador) TBD	Contract finished	2016	(El Salvador) TBD	2016	th (Apertura 2015)
TBD	(El Salvador) TBD	Interim finished	2016	(El Salvador) TBD	2016	th (Apertura 2015)
TBD	(El Salvador) TBD	Contract finished	2016	(El Salvador) TBD	2016	th (Apertura 2015)
TBD	(El Salvador) TBD	TBD	2016	(El Salvador) TBD	2016	th (Apertura 2015)
TBD	(El Salvador) TBD	TBD	2016	(El Salvador) TBD	2016	th (Apertura 2015)
TBD	(El Salvador) TBD	TBD	2016	(El Salvador) TBD	2016	th (Apertura 2015)

=== During the Apertura season ===
Team	Outgoing manager	Manner of departure	Date of vacancy	Replaced by	Date of appointment	Position in table
La Asunción	(El Salvador) Juan Ramon Trejo	Sacked	January 2016	(Brazil) Eraldo Correia	January 2016	th (Clausura 2016)
Brasilia	(El Salvador) Oscar Martinez	Resigned	January 2016	(El Salvador) Erick Cruz	January 2016	th (Clausura 2016)
Firpo	(El Salvador) David Ramirez	Sacked	February 2016	(El Salvador) Victor Coreas	February 2016	th (Clausura 2016)
Atletico Balboa	(Argentina) Andres Tabares	Resigned	February 2016	(El Salvador) Julio Cesar Martinez	February 2016	th (Clausura 2016)
Audaz	(El Salvador) Jorge Calles	Sacked	February 2016	(El Salvador) Mario Mayén Meza	February 2016	th (Clausura 2015)
Independiente	(El Salvador) Ricardo Garcia	Sacked	February 2016	(El Salvador) Nelson Mauricio Ancheta	February 2016	th (Clausura 2015)
Marte Soyapango	(El Salvador) Juan Ramón Paredes	Sacked	February 2016	(Uruguay) Rubén Alonso	February 2016	th (Clausura 2015)
San Pablo Tacachico	(El Salvador) Miguel Ángel Soriano	Resigned	February 2016	(El Salvador) Najarro	March 2016	th (Clausura 2015)
Platense	(El Salvador) Eduardo Lara Moscote	Resigned	February 2016	(El Salvador) Miguel Aguilar Obando	February 2016	th (Clausura 2015)
San Rafael Cedros	(Honduras) German Rodriguez	Resigned	February 2016	(El Salvador)	February 2016	th (Clausura 2015)
Once Municipal	(El Salvador) Giovanni Trigueros	Resigned	February 2016	(El Salvador) Rubén Guevara	March 2016	th (Clausura 2015)
Quequeisque	(El Salvador) Mauricio Alfaro	Resigned	February 2016	(El Salvador) Luis Guevara Mora	February 2016	th (Clausura 2015)
Audaz	(El Salvador) Mario Mayén Meza	Resigned	April 2016	(El Salvador) Wilson Angulo	April 2016	th (Clausura 2015)

==== Grupo Centro Occidente ====
Pos	Team	Pld	W	D	L	GF	GA	GD	Pts	Qualification
1	El Roble (Q)	20	14	4	2	53	24	+29	46	Qualification for playoffs
2	Leones (Q)	20	10	3	7	30	30	0	33	Qualification for playoffs
3	Vendaval (Q)	20	10	2	8	36	29	+7	32	Qualification for playoffs
4	Comalapa (Q)	20	9	4	7	38	30	+8	31	Qualification for playoffs
5	Once Lobos (Q)	20	9	3	8	26	21	+5	30	Qualification for playoffs
6	Apopa (Q)	20	8	5	7	40	33	+7	29	Qualification for playoffs
7	Marte Soyapango (Q)	20	9	2	9	31	31	0	29	Qualification for playoffs
8	Quequeisque (Q)	20	7	6	7	30	29	+1	27	Qualification for playoffs
9	Once Municipal	20	7	6	7	36	37	−1	27	
10	Brasilia	20	4	3	13	23	57	−34	15	
11	San Pablo Tacachico	20	3	2	15	17	39	−22	11	

(Q) Qualified for the phase indicated

Home \ Away	APO	BRA	COM	ROB	LEO	SOY	OLB	OMU	QUE	SAN	VEN
Apopa		7–1	2–3	2–3	2–0	2–1	2–1	5–3	1–2	1–0	1–2
Brasilia	0–1		1–2	1–2	1–3	1–2	2–1	0–0	1–1	2–0	3–4
Comalapa	5–3	1–0		3–2	4–0	0–2	0–1	3–3	3–2	3–0	1–1
El Roble	2–2	8–0	2–1		2–0	4–1	3–1	5–0	1–0	3–1	4–2
Leones	4–3	1–1	2–1	1–1		3–0	1–0	3–2	1–0	2–1	0–1
Marte Soyapango	0–0	1–2	2–2	1–2	3–2		1–0	0–1	2–1	2–0	2–0
Once Lobos	2–0	5–0	2–1	1–1	0–1	3–2		0–0	2–0	1–0	0–1
Once Municipal	0–0	8–2	2–1	1–2	2–1	3–2	1–2		2–2	3–1	3–1
Quequeisque	1–1	5–1	1–1	4–4	0–2	2–1	1–3	0–0		2–0	2–1
San Pablo Tacachico	2–4	3–1	1–3	1–3	1–1	1–3	1–1	4–1	0–1		1–0
Vendaval	1–1	2–3	1–0	2–0	5–2	1–2	3–0	3–1	2–3	3–0	

Legend: Blue = home team win; Yellow = draw; Red = away team win.

==== Grupo Centro Oriente ====
Pos	Team	Pld	W	D	L	GF	GA	GD	Pts	Qualification
1	Municipal Limeño (Q)	22	15	6	1	37	15	+22	51	Qualification for playoffs
2	Topiltzín (Q)	22	10	6	6	29	23	+6	36	Qualification for playoffs
3	Audaz (Q)	22	9	6	7	24	23	+1	33	Qualification for playoffs
4	Independiente (Q)	22	8	7	7	34	29	+5	31	Qualification for playoffs
5	Fuerte San Francisco (Q)	22	7	10	5	26	21	+5	31	Qualification for playoffs
6	La Asunción (Q)	22	8	6	8	32	32	0	30	Qualification for playoffs
7	Aspirante (Q)	22	8	6	8	21	25	−4	30	Qualification for playoffs
8	FC San Rafael Cedros (Q)	22	8	5	9	27	32	−5	29	Qualification for playoffs
9	Toros	22	7	7	8	33	32	+1	28	
10	Platense	22	5	9	8	26	30	−4	24	
11	L.Á. Firpo	22	3	7	12	20	33	−13	16	
12	Ciclón del Golfo	22	3	7	12	21	35	−14	16	

(Q) Qualified for the phase indicated

Home \ Away	ASP	AUD	CDG	IND	ASU	FIR	FSF	MLI	PLA	SRC	TOP	TOR
Aspirante		0–2	2–1	1–4	2–0	3–1	2–1	0–0	1–1	1–1	0–1	1–1
Audaz	0–1		0–0	2–1	2–2	2–0	0–0	0–2	1–1	2–2	1–2	2–0
Ciclón del Golfo	2–1	0–1		0–0	1–2	3–2	1–1	0–2	2–5	1–2	0–1	1–2
Independiente F.C.	0–1	0–1	2–0		2–0	2–0	3–3	1–1	2–1	1–0	1–1	1–1
La Asunción	1–0	4–2	2–1	1–2		2–0	0–1	2–2	1–1	3–0	1–2	2–2
Firpo	0–1	0–1	1–1	1–1	2–2		2–1	1–1	0–1	4–1	2–1	2–2
Fuerte San Francisco	2–1	0–0	1–1	4–1	2–1	0–0		1–2	1–1	1–2	3–3	1–0
Municipal Limeño	4–0	2–0	3–1	2–1	1–0	2–1	1–1		0–0	3–1	1–0	3–2
Platense	2–2	2–0	2–1	1–3	1–1	1–1	0–2	1–2		0–1	1–1	2–1
FC San Rafael Cedros	1–0	2–1	1–1	2–1	1–2	2–0	0–1	0–1	4–1		1–2	1–1
Topiltzín	0–1	1–2	2–2	0–0	2–3	2–0	1–0	2–0	1–0	1–1		2–1
Toros F.C.	0–0	1–2	1–2	6–5	3–0	1–0	0–0	0–2	2–1	4–1	2–1	

Legend: Blue = home team win; Yellow = draw; Red = away team win.

== Final Series ==
=== Cláusura ===
Quarterfinals
1A	El Roble	2	4	6
8B	FC San Rafael Cedros	1	1	2
2A	Leones	1	0	1
7B	Aspirante	2	0	2
3A	Vendaval	0	2	2
6B	La Asunción	0	1	1
4A	Comalapa	0	2	2 (6)
5B	Fuerte San Francisco	0	2	2 (5)
1B	Municipal Limeño	5	3	8
8A	Quequeisque	1	2	3
2B	Topiltzín	1	2	3 (3)
7A	Marte Soyapango	1	2	3 (2)
3B	Audaz	3	5	8
6A	Apopa	1	2	3
2	Independiente	1	3	4 (4)
5A	Once Lobos	2	2	4 (5)

Semifinals
1	El Roble	1	4	5
8	Aspirante	0	3	3
3	Vendaval	0	1	1
6	Comalapa	4	3	7
2	Municipal Limeño	3	3	6
7	Topiltzín	2	1	3
4	Audaz	1	1	2
5	Once Lobos	1	0	1

Preminilaryfinals
El Roble	0	1	1 (4)
Comalapa	0	1	1 (5)
Municipal Limeño	0	3	3
Audaz	0	1	1

Finals
Comalapa	1	2	3 (4)
Municipal Limeño	0	3	3 (5)

=== Finals ===
==== First leg ====
5 June 2016

Comalapa	1-0	Municipal Limeno
Édgar Valladares 29'		Nil

Estadio José Gregorio Martínez, Chalatenango
Attendance: 1,909

==== Second leg ====
12 June 2016

Municipal Limeno	3-2	Comalapa
Roberto Flores 37'; Mario Machado 47'; Jefferson Viveros 77'		Édgar Valladares 40'; 90'

Estadio Jose Ramon Flores, Santa Rosa de Lima
Referee: TBD

Municipal Limeno won 5-4 on penalties, aggregate tied 3-3.

Clausura 2016 champions

5th title

=== Individual awards ===
Hombre GOL	Best Coach Award	Best Goalkeeper Award
(Colombia) Mitchell Mercado Martínez; El Roble	(El Salvador) TBD; TBD	(El Salvador) Abiel Francisco Aguilera; Municipal Limeno

== Aggregate table ==
=== Grupo Centro-Occidente ===
Pos	Team	Pld	W	D	L	GF	GA	GD	Pts	Relegation
1	El Roble	40	22	9	9	85	51	+34	75	
2	Comalapa	40	20	13	7	64	38	+26	73	
3	Once Lobos	40	20	11	9	65	42	+23	71	
4	Vendaval	40	16	14	10	65	50	+15	62	
5	Once Municipal	40	15	10	15	65	64	+1	55	
6	Atlético Apopa	40	14	9	17	67	69	−2	51	
7	Marte Soyapango	40	15	4	21	59	68	−9	49	
8	Quequeisque	40	12	11	17	47	55	−8	47	
9	Leones de Occidente	40	12	10	18	60	82	−22	46	
10	EF San Pablo Tacachico	40	13	4	23	56	71	−15	43	
11	Brasilia	40	10	7	23	44	87	−43	37	Relegation to Tercera División de Fútbol Salvadoreño

=== Grupo Centro-Oriente ===
Pos	Team	Pld	W	D	L	GF	GA	GD	Pts	Relegation
1	Municipal Limeño	44	26	10	8	63	32	+31	88	
2	L.Á. Firpo	44	19	11	14	64	51	+13	68	
3	Topiltzín	44	19	10	15	66	56	+10	67	
4	Audaz	44	18	13	13	48	44	+4	67	
5	Independiente	44	16	16	12	63	50	+13	64	
6	Fuerte San Francisco	44	15	19	10	56	47	+9	64	
7	Toros	44	14	14	16	55	60	−5	56	
8	Aspirante	44	15	9	20	44	59	−15	54	
9	Platense	44	11	16	17	48	62	−14	49	
10	FC San Rafael Cedros	44	13	9	22	59	83	−24	48	
11	La Asunción	44	12	10	22	61	70	−9	46	
12	Ciclón del Golfo	44	11	13	20	56	69	−13	46	Relegation to Tercera División de Fútbol Salvadoreño
