= Carlos Romero (football coach) =

Salvadoran footballer and manager (born 1966)

Personal information
- Full name: Carlos Romero Quintanilla
- Date of birth: July 24, 1966 (age 60)
- Place of birth: La Union, El Salvador

International career
Years	Team	Apps	(Gls)
- El Salvador

Managerial career
- 2011-2012: Limeno
- 2012: Aspirante
- 2012: Atletico Marte (assistant)
- 2013: Guadalupano
- 2014: Aspirante
- 2015: Limeno
- 2016-2017: Jocoro
- 2018: C.D. Audaz
- 2018-2019: C.D. Aguila
- 2019: Quiche FC
- 2020-2021: Jocoro
- 2021-2022: Limeno
- 2022: LA Firpo
- 2023: Cacahuatique
- 2023-: Jocoro (assistant)
- 2024-: Jocoro (interim)

Carlos Romero Quintanilla (born July 24, 1966) is a Salvadorean football manager and former player who managers Jocoro.

== Titles ==
Season	Team	Title
Apertura 2015	Municipal Limeno	Segunda División de El Salvador
Clausura 2016	Municipal Limeno	Segunda División de El Salvador
Apertura 2017	Jocoro F.C.	Segunda División de El Salvador
Clausura 2019	C.D. Aguila	Primera División de El Salvador
Apertura 2025	Atletico Balboa	Segunda División de El Salvador
