= Jocoro FC =

Association football club in El Salvador

Jocoro
- Full name: Jocoro Fútbol Club
- Nicknames: Los Fogoneros; Morazanicos
- Founded: 19 May 1991; 35 years ago
- Dissolved: 25 March 2025; 18 months ago
- Ground: Complejo Deportivo Tierra de Fuego, Morazán
- Chairman: (El Salvador) Leonel Hernández
- Manager: (El Salvador) Alvaro Canizalez
- League: (El Salvador) Primera División
- 2022 Apertura: Overall: 3rd Playoffs: Runners-up
Home colours	Away colours

Jocoro Fútbol Club was a Salvadoran professional football club based in Jocoro, Morazán, El Salvador. The Team competes in Primera División, the top division of the salvadoran football system.

Jocoro has won two Salavdoran Segunda Division league titles, in Apertura 2017 and again in Clausura 2018, as well as two Tercera Division in 1995 and Clausura 2016.

== History ==
The club was founded in 1991. In 1992, the club played in their very first season of professional football in Liga Mayor B (currently the Terecera division), the club would spend two seasons before winning promotion to the segunda division. The club spent years trying to promotion to the first division, they made the Playoff-relegation game three times in 1998, 1999 and 2001, however they always fell short.

The club gained promotion to the first division by winning the Apertura 2017, defeating El Roble de Ilobasco on aggregate, and then the Clausura title, defeating Brujos de Izalco 6–3 on aggregate. The club enjoyed its most successful years through the 2020–21 season, achieving a best-ever third-place finish, narrowly missing the final with a 2–1 aggregate loss to Águila.

In the 2022 Apertura, Jocoro reached the Primera division final for the first time in the club's history under the direction of Jose Romero. However they lost 2-0, which allowed FAS to become champions for the nineteenth time.

After reaching two finals in five the years, the club suffered a disastrous season Clausura 2024, the club failed to stay consistent on and off the field. The club only won 2 games, 3 draws and 17 losses, the club was almost relegated, Jocoro had four coaches after the start of the 2024 season; all four coaches resigned due to results and lack of payment. Their last coach was Carlos Romero.

Finally it was announced that Jocoro had sold their spot in the primera division to Titan. However FESFUT announced with Jocoro failure to meet the requirement to register in the Primera Division, they would lose their spot and therefore could not sell their spot to Titan. The team was forced relegated to the Segunda Division.

On 25 March 2025, it was announced by Comisión Disciplinaria de la Federación Salvadoreña de Fútbol (FESFUT) that the club will be banned from all levels of Salvadoran football and disbanded, while boards members Leonel Hernández (president), Derminio Romero (vice-president), Daysi Hernández (secretary), Manrique Rodríguez (prosecretary), Alejandro Flores (treasurer), Waldo Romero (protresurer), Rutilio Hernández (first director), Fidel Lazo (second director) and Miguel Anaya (third director) were banned from all football related activities for 10 years.

== Honours ==
- Primera Division of El Salvadorand predecessors
  - Runners-up (2): Apertura 2022, Apertura 2023
- Segunda Division and predecessors
  - Champions: (2) :Apertura 2017, Clausura 2018
  - Runners up: (3) : 1998, 1999, 2001
- Tercera Division and predecessors
  - Champions: (1) : 1995, Torneo Clausura 2016

== Stadium ==
- Complejo Deportivo Tierra de Fuego (2017-2018, 2020-2024)
  - Estadio Luis Amílcar Moreno
  - Estadio Correcaminos, Gotera, Morazan (2018-2019)
  - Estadio Jose Ramon Flores Berrios, Santa Rosa Lima (2019-2020)
  - Estadio Olímpico Metropolitano, San Pedro Sula, Honduras (2023) games in the CONCACAF Central American Cup.

Jocoro plays its home games at Complejo Deportivo Tierra de Fuego in Jocoro. However the club stated the Complejo Tierra de fuego was too small to play in the primera division therefore they moved their games to the bigger Estadio Correcaminos.

== Sponsorship ==
Companies that Jocoro currently has sponsorship deals with for 2023–2024 includes:

- Milan – Official kit suppliers
- Caja de Credito Jocoro – Official sponsors
- Inversions bendicion de dios – Official sponsors
- Electrolit – Official sponsors
- L& A – Official sponsors
- Las Perlitas – Official sponsors

== Club records ==
- First victory in the Primera Division for Jocoro: 3-2 Firpo, 29 July 2018
- First goalscorer in the Primera Division for Jocoro: Paraguayan Jorge Caceres v Firpo 29 July 2018
- 100th goal in the Primera Division for Jocoro: Honduran Ovidio Lanza v Atletico Marte 4 January 2021
- Largest Home victory, Primera División: 5-1 v Limeno 25 October 2020
- Largest Away victory, Primera División: 3-0 v Pasaquina, 29 October 2018
- Largest Home loss, Primera División: 1–3 v Chalatenango, 4 November 2018
- Largest Away loss, Primera División: 1-4 v A.D. Isidro Metapan, 7 April 2019
- Highest home attendance: 2,000 v Primera División, 2018
- Highest away attendance: 1,000 v Primera División, San Salvador, 2018
- Highest average attendance, season: 49,176, Primera División
- Most goals scored, season, Primera División: 25, Apertura 2018
- Worst season: Segunda Division 2002-2003: 1 win, 4 draws and 17 losses (7 points)
- First CONCACAF tournament match (2023 CONCACAF Central American Cup): Jocoro 1–4 Cobán Imperial; Estadio Olímpico Metropolitano, San Pedro Sula; 1 August 2023.
- Largest Home victory, CONCACAF tournament match (2023 CONCACAF Central American Cup): 5-1 v TBD, 2023
- Largest Away victory, CONCACAF tournament match (2023 CONCACAF Central American Cup): 3-0 v TBD, 2023
- Largest Home loss, CONCACAF tournament match (2023 CONCACAF Central American Cup): 0-4 v Saprissa, 11 August 2023
- Largest Away loss, CONCACAF tournament match (2023 CONCACAF Central American Cup): 0-5 v Cartaginés, 23 August 2023

=== Overall seasons table in Primera División de Fútbol Profesional ===
As of 30 December, after their 2024 Apertura when they were forced relegation

Pos.	Club	Season In D1	Pl.	W	D	L	GS	GA	Dif.
TBA	Jocoro F.C.	6	248	65	76	107	275	358	−83

=== Individual records ===
- Record appearances (all competitions): TBD, 822 from 1957 to 1975
- Record appearances (Primera Division): Honduran Junior Padilla, 150 from 2020 to 2024
- Most capped player for El Salvador: 63 (0 whilst at Jocoro), Juan Jose Gomez
- Most international caps for El Salvador while a Jocoro player: 3, Juan Carlos Argueta
- Most caps won whilst at Jocoro: 3, Juan Carlos Argueta.
- Record scorer in league: Salvadorian Juan Carlos Argueta, 25
- Most goals in a season (all competitions): TBD, 62 (1927/28) (47 in League, 15 in Cup competitions)
- Most goals in a season (Primera Division): Argentinian German Aguila, 15
- First goal scorer in International competition: Argentinian Luis Acuña (v. Cobán Imperial; Estadio Olímpico Metropolitano, San Pedro Sula; 1 August 2023)
- Most goals in a CONCACAF competitions: 1, Argentinians German Aguila and Luis Acuna
- Most appearance in a CONCACAF competitions:, TBD

== Current squad ==
As of December 2025

Note: Flags indicate national team as defined under FIFA eligibility rules; some limited exceptions apply. Players may hold more than one non-FIFA nationality.

No.	Pos.	Nation	Player
—		ESA	TBD
—		ESA	TBD
—		ESA	TBD

No.	Pos.	Nation	Player
—		ESA	TBD
—		ESA	TBD
—		ESA	TBD

=== Players with dual citizenship ===
- (El Salvador) (United States) Allan Benitez

=== Out on loan ===
Note: Flags indicate national team as defined under FIFA eligibility rules; some limited exceptions apply. Players may hold more than one non-FIFA nationality.

No.	Pos.	Nation	Player
—		ESA	TBD (at TBD for the 2023-24 Apertura and Clausura)

=== In ===
Note: Flags indicate national team as defined under FIFA eligibility rules; some limited exceptions apply. Players may hold more than one non-FIFA nationality.

No.	Pos.	Nation	Player
—		COL	Jhon Machado (From TBD)
—		ESA	TBD (From TBD)
—		ESA	TBD (From TBD)
—		ESA	TBD (From TBD)
—		ESA	TBD (From TBD)

No.	Pos.	Nation	Player
—		ESA	TBD (From TBD)
—		ESA	TBD (From TBD)
—		ESA	TBD (From TBD)

=== Out ===
Note: Flags indicate national team as defined under FIFA eligibility rules; some limited exceptions apply. Players may hold more than one non-FIFA nationality.

No.	Pos.	Nation	Player
—		ESA	Jaime Ortiz (To Isidro Metapan)
—		ARG	Luis Acuña (To Fuerte San Francisco)
—		ESA	Lester Blanco (To TBD)
—		ESA	Salvador Galindo (To Fuerte San Francisco)
—		ESA	Nelson Moreno (To Fuerte San Francisco)
—		COL	Jhon Machado (To TBD)
—		ESA	Elvis Claros (To Municipal Limeno)
—		ESA	Juan Carlos Argueta (To Isidro Metapan)
—		ARG	German Aguila (To FAS)
—		ESA	Nelson Rodriguez (To Dragon)
—		ESA	Jose Orlando Martinez (To Dragon)

No.	Pos.	Nation	Player
—		ESA	Enmanuel Hernandez (To Fuerte San Francisco)
—		ESA	Carlos Arevalo (To Platense)
—		ESA	Wilson Rugamas (To Fuerte San Francisco)
—		ESA	Henry Maldonado (To Dragon)
—		ESA	Oscar Sanchez (To Cacahuatique)
—		ESA	Guillermo Fuentes (To Cacahuatique)
—		ESA	Jonathan Quintanilla (To Dragon)
—		ESA	Joel Turcios (To Cacahuatique)
—		ESA	Hugo Hernandez (To Cacahuatique)
—		ESA	Alcides Gomez (To Cacahuatique)

== Reserve Team ==
Jocoro's youth squad plays in the twelve-team Primera División Reserves (El Salvador). Current members of the squad are: As of February 2023.

Note: Flags indicate national team as defined under FIFA eligibility rules; some limited exceptions apply. Players may hold more than one non-FIFA nationality.

No.	Pos.	Nation	Player
32	MF	ESA	José Membreño
33	DF	ESA	Luis Méndez
35	DF	ESA	Érick Sosa
36	MF	ESA	Edwin Benítez González
37	DF	ESA	Bryan Hernández
38	DF	ESA	Kevin Girón
39	DF	ESA	Edgar Soto
40	DF	ESA	Ronald Calix Cruz
41	MF	ESA	Bryan Mejía
42	MF	ESA	Érick Álvarez

No.	Pos.	Nation	Player
43	MF	ESA	Jonathan Turcios
44	MF	ESA	Daniel Rodríguez
45	GK	ESA	Nelson Guerrero
46	MF	ESA	Ricardo Portillo
47	MF	ESA	David Lazo Parras
48	GK	ESA	Steven García
49	FW	ESA	Marvin Pineda
53	GK	ESA	Marlon Hernández
54	MF	ESA	Wilman Ramírez
55	MF	ESA	Jorge Amaya

=== Out on loan ===
Note: Flags indicate national team as defined under FIFA eligibility rules; some limited exceptions apply. Players may hold more than one non-FIFA nationality.

No. / Pos. / Nation / Player	No. / Pos. / Nation / Player

== Notable players ==
=== Internationals who have played at Jocoro ===
- (Cuba) Luis Paradela
- (Honduras) Carlos Lanza
- (Trinidad and Tobago) Jamal Jack
- (El Salvador) William Maldonado
- (El Salvador) Juan Jose Gomez
- (El Salvador) Alexander Campos
- (El Salvador) Yuvini Salamanca
- (El Salvador) Juan Carlos Argueta

=== Most appearances ===
Place	Name	Period	Primera Division	Playoffs	SLV Cup	Continental	Total
1	(Honduras) Junior Padilla	2020–2024	120	0	0	4	150
2	(El Salvador) Elvis Claros	2020–2024	100	0	0	4	147
3	(El Salvador) Nelson Moreno	2020–2024	88	0	0	1	130
4	(El Salvador) Nelson Alvarenga	2018, 2019–2022	121	0	0	0	121
5	(El Salvador) Yuvini Salamanca	2020-2023	118	0	0	0	118
6	(El Salvador) Juan Carlos Argueta	2022–2024	75	0	0	0	75
6	(El Salvador) Edgar Cruz	2018–2020	68	0	0	0	68
7	(El Salvador) Francisco Escobar	2018–2020	67	0	0	0	67
8	(Paraguay) Jorge Narciso Cáceres	2019–2020	64	0	0	0	64
9	(El Salvador) Francisco Noé Reyes	2018–2020, 2020-2021	60	0	0	0	60
10	(El Salvador) Hector Ramírez Carvajal	2021-2023	60	0	0	0	60

Bolded players are currently on the Jocoro FC roster.

=== Goals ===
Place	Name	Period	Primera Division	Playoffs	SLV Cup	Continental	Total
1	(El Salvador) Juan Carlos Argueta	2022-2024	25	0	0	0	25
2	(Paraguay) Diego Areco	2018-2019, 2021	21	0	0	0	21
3	(Argentina) German Aguila	2023-2024	18	0	0	1	19
4	(El Salvador) Edgar Cruz	2018-2020	17	0	0	0	17
4	(Colombia) Jhon Machado	2019-2022	16	0	0	0	16
6	(Honduras) Carlos Lanza	2020-2021	13	1	0	0	13
7	(El Salvador) Nelson Alvarenga	2019-2022	12	0	0	0	12
8	(El Salvador) Santos Guzman	2020-2022	12	0	0	0	12
9	(Honduras) Junior Padilla	2020-2024	11	0	0	0	11
10	(Argentina) Luis Acuna	2023-2024	9	0	0	1	9
11	(El Salvador) Yuvini Salamanca	2020-present	7	0	0	0	7
12	(Nigeria) Fredrick Ogangan	2018	4	0	0	0	4

Bolded players are currently on the Jocoro roster.

== Personal ==
=== Coaching staff ===
As of 14 February 2024

Position	Staff
Manager	(El Salvador) TBD (*)
Assistant Manager	(El Salvador) Carlos Romero (*)
Technical Advisor	(El Salvador) Víctor Fuentes
Reserve Manager	(El Salvador) Nelson Gomez (*)
Goalkeeper Coach	(El Salvador) Christian Reyes (*)
Under 17 Manager	(El Salvador) Nelson Gomez (*)
Under 15 Manager	(El Salvador) Rolando Torres
Ladies Manager	(El Salvador) Alvaro Canizales (*)
Fitness Coach	(El Salvador) Yeltzin Mejia (*)
Team Doctor	(El Salvador) Raul Serrano
Kinesiologist	(El Salvador) Manuel Carranza (*)
Utility	(El Salvador) Wilfredo Perez (*)

=== board of directors ===
As of 1 August 2023

Position	Staff
Owner	(El Salvador) Morazán Football Association
President	(El Salvador) Leonel Antonio Hernández (*)
vice-president	(El Salvador) Omar Eliseo Romero Espinal
Secretary	(El Salvador) TBD
Vice-Secretary	(El Salvador) TBD
Administrative Manager	(El Salvador) Marvin Hernandez
Treasury	(El Salvador) Mauricio Aguilar
vice-Treasury	(El Salvador) TBD
Press secretary	(El Salvador) Jose Hernandez (*)
Representative	(El Salvador) Emerson Avalos (*)
Representative	(El Salvador) Elena Ramirez (*)
Representative	(El Salvador) Luis Granados (*)
Sporting Director	(El Salvador) Rimey Nunez (*)
Scraper	(El Salvador) TBD

== Managers ==
Jocoro have had 20 managers in 27 years. The first manager at the club was TBD. List of Head Coaches of Jocoro F.C. from when the club was formed:

Name	From	To
(El Salvador) TBD	1992	1992
(El Salvador) Esteban Melara	TBD	TBD
(El Salvador) José Mario Martínez	1997	1998
(El Salvador) José Mario Martínez	2000	2000
(Uruguay) Rubén Alonso	January 2001	May 2001
(El Salvador) José Mario Martínez	January 2002	2000
(El Salvador) Ramón Velasques	2002	2002
(Argentina) Jorge Ortiz	2002	2002
(Honduras) Carlos Martínez	2002	September 2002
(El Salvador) TBD	TBD	TBD
(El Salvador) José Rolando Torres ^{**}	April 2016	June 2016
(El Salvador) Carlos Romero	July 2016	March 2017
(El Salvador) TBD	April 2017	July 2017
(El Salvador) Carlos Romero ^{†}	August 2017	March 2018
(El Salvador) Rubén Alonso ^{§}	March 2018	June 2018
(El Salvador) (Argentina) Emiliano Barrera *	June 2018	June 2018
(El Salvador) Nelson Ancheta	July 2018	December 2018
(Paraguay) Cristóbal Cubilla Delgadillo	December 2018	February 2019
(El Salvador) Guillermo Rivera	February 2019	June 2019
(El Salvador) Nelson Ancheta	June 2019	August 2019
(El Salvador) Oscar Alvarez	August 2019	September 2019
(El Salvador) Marvin Benitez	September 2019	December 2019
(Argentina) Juan Andrés Sarulyte	December 2019	February 2020
(El Salvador) Jose Romero	February 2020	March 2020
(El Salvador) Carlos Romero	March 2020	April 2021
(El Salvador) Jose Romero	April 2021	May 2021
(Uruguay) Pablo Quiñonez	May 2021	26 August 2021
(El Salvador) Victor Coreas	27 August 2021	December 2021
(El Salvador) Edgar Henriquez	4 January 2022	May 2022
(Colombia) Carlos Estrada ***	29 May 2022	5 September 2022
(Honduras) Jorge Pineda	6 September 2022	October 2022
(El Salvador) Jose Romero ^{£}	October 2022	December 2022
(Honduras) Guillermo Bernandez	December 2022	28 February 2023
(El Salvador) Victor Coreas	28 February 2023	21 June 2023
(Peru) Agustín Castillo ^{#}	22 June 2023	12 February 2024
(El Salvador) Carlos Romero (Interim)	13 February 2024	24 March 2024
(El Salvador) Marvin Hernandez (Interim)	25 March 2024	31 March 2024
(El Salvador) Carlos Romero	April 2024	July 2024
Hiatus	August 2024	Present

- ^{*} Appointed as coach, coached a few pre-season but resigned before the commencement of the actual campaign.
- ^{**} Won a Title in the Tercera Division
- ^{***} Appointed as coach, the season was suspended before he coached a game and resigned prior to the commencement of the season
- ^{†} Won the Apertura title in the Segunda Division
- ^{§} Won the Clausura title in the Segunda Division
- ^{£} Runner up in the Primera Division 2022 Apertura season
- ^{#} Runner up in the Primera Division 2022 Apertura season

Managerial records:

- Two man has managed the club through two different spells, Carlos Romero, in 2016 and then 2017-2018, and Rubén Alonso in 2000-2001 and then March 2018-June 2018 .
- The longest spell as Jocoro manager was by Ruben Alonso, 2 years (2000–2001)
- Uruguayan Ruben Alonso was the first foreign coach to manage Jocoro

== Other departments ==
=== Football ===
==== Reserve team ====
The reserve team serves mainly as the final stepping stone for promising young players under the age of 21 before being promoted to the main team. The second team is coached by TBD. the team played in the Primera División Reserves, their greatest successes were winning the Reserve championships in TBD. It plays its home matches at TBD, adjacent to the first team's ground, and it is coached by TBD.

==== Junior teams ====
The youth team (under 17 and under 15) has produced some of El Salvador's top football players, including TBD and TBD. It plays its home matches at TBD, adjacent to the first team's ground, and it is coached by TBD.

==== Women's team ====
The women's first team, which is led by head coach TBD, features several members of the El Salvador national ladies team. Their greatest successes were reaching the semi finals of Apertura 2023, where they lost 3-2 on aggregate to Aguila Women's.
