= Santiagueño F.C. =

Association football club in El Salvador

- Full name: Santiagueño Fútbol Club
- Founded: 2022
- Ground: Polideportivo Santiago de la Frontera; Santiago de la Frontera, Santa Ana department, El Salvador
- Manager: (El Salvador) Oliver Sanchez
- League: Tercera Division de Fútbol Salvadoreño
- Grupo Centro Oriente A, 4th
Home colours	Away colours

Santiagueño Fútbol Club is a Salvadoran professional football club based in Santiago de la Frontera, Santa Ana department, El Salvador.

The club currently plays in the Tercera Division de Fútbol Salvadoreño.

== Honours ==
=== Domestic honours ===
==== Leagues ====
- Tercera División Salvadorean and predecessors
  - Champions (2) : N/A
  - Runners up (2) : Clausura 2025
  - Play-off winner (2):
- La Asociación Departamental de Fútbol Aficionado' and predecessors (4th tier)
  - Champions (1): 2022-2023
  - Play-off winner (2):

== Current squad ==
As of: June 2025 Note: Flags indicate national team as defined under FIFA eligibility rules; some limited exceptions apply. Players may hold more than one non-FIFA nationality.

No.	Pos.	Nation	Player
—		ESA	TBD
—		ESA	TBD
—		ESA	TBD
—		ESA	TBD
—		ESA	TBD
—		ESA	TBD

No.	Pos.	Nation	Player
—		ESA	TBD
—		ESA	TBD
—		ESA	TBD
—		ESA	TBD
—		ESA	TBD

== List of players ==
- David Rivas
- Bryan Flores
- Vladimir Laínez
- Luis Flores
- Pablo Franco
- Sigfredo Guevara
- Armando Martínez
- David Escobar
- Maynor Saravia
- Wilber Chachagua
- Francisco Molina
- William Amaya
- Yonathan Sánchez
- Kevin Zetino
- Maximiliano López
- Josué Ibáñez
- Fernando Laínez
- Erick Ramos
- Luis Lima

== List of coaches ==
- (El Salvador) Oliver Sánchez
- (El Salvador) Jorge Abrego (October 2024 -Present)
