= Edgar Henríquez =

Salvadoran footballer and manager (born 1964)

Personal information
- Full name: Edgar Alonso Henríquez
- Date of birth: 16 March 1964 (age 62)
- Place of birth: San Salvador, El Salvador
- Position: Midfielder

Senior career*
Years	Team	Apps	(Gls)
1983	Adler San Nicolás		
1984	Salvadoreño de Armenia		
1985–1986	CD UES		
1986–1987	CD Chalatenango		
1988–1994	CD Luis Ángel Firpo		
1994–1996	El Roble		
1996–1997	Alianza FC		
1997	El Roble		

International career
1986–1994	El Salvador		

Managerial career
- España Adesse
- San Luis
- 2008: Nejapa FC (assistant)
- 2009–2010: CD Vendaval
- 2010: CD UES (assistant)
- 2010–2011: CD UES (interim)
- 2011: CD Topiltzín
- 2011: Alianza FC (reserves)
- 2011–2012: Santa Tecla FC
- 2012–2013: CD Luis Ángel Firpo
- 2013–2014: Santa Tecla FC
- 2014: CD Marte Soyapango
- 2015: El Salvador U-17 team
- 2015–2016: CD UES
- 2017–2018: Independiente FC
- 2018: CD Vendaval
- 2018–2020: Alianza FC (reserves)
- 2022: Chalatenango
- 2023-Present: El Salvador U-21 team
- * Club domestic league appearances and goals

Edgar Alonso Henríquez (born 16 March 1964) is a former Salvadoran professional football midfielder and currently the manager of El Salvador U-21 team.

== Club career ==
Nicknamed Kiko, Henríquez started his career at Tercera División club Adler San Nicolás, then moved up a division with Salvadoreño de Armenia and made his debut in the Primera División de Fútbol de El Salvador with UES in 1985.

He also played for the country's top flight clubs Chalatenango, Luis Ángel Firpo, with whom he won four league titles, El Roble and Alianza, with whom he won one more championship.

He retired from playing in 1997.

== International career ==
Henríquez made his debut for El Salvador in 1986 and has represented his country in 1 FIFA World Cup qualification match.

His final international game was a May 1994 Miami Cup match against Colombia.

== Coaching career ==
He coached various clubs of the Primera División de Fútbol de El Salvador, including UES, Luis Ángel Firpo and Santa Tecla, with varying degree of success.

=== Nejapa ===
In 2009, he was assistant of Nejapa.

=== Vendaval ===
In 2009, Henríquez signed as coach of Vendaval. He left the team in 2010.

=== UES ===
Henríquez signed as new coach of UES in November 2010. His balance with UES was two wins, six draws and four losses, after being replaced by Brazilian manager Eraldo Correia in March 2011.

=== Topiltzín ===
In 2011, he signed as new coach of Topiltzín, replacing Miguel Aguilar Obando.

=== Alianza reserves ===
In June 2011, Henríquez signed as new coach of the Alianza reserves, after moving in from Segunda División club Topiltzín.

=== Santa Tecla ===
In December 2011, he signed as new coach of Santa Tecla, replacing Rubén Alonso. Henríqued led the team to won the Clausura 2012 final of Segunda División and the promotion to the Primera División. He left the team in June 2012, being replaced by Osvaldo Escudero.

=== Luis Ángel Firpo ===
In 2012, he signed as new coach of Luis Ángel Firpo, replacing Nelson Mauricio Ancheta. Henríquez left the team in March 2013, being replaced by Roberto Gamarra.

=== Return to Santa Tecla ===
Henríquez signed again as new coach of Santa Tecla for the Apertura 2013 tournament, replacing William Renderos Iraheta. Santa Tecla finished in eighth position at the end of the tournament.

Henríquez left the team in May 2014 in mutual agreement with the club, being replaced by Osvaldo Escudero.

=== El Salvador under-17 ===
In April 2015, Henríquez was hired to become the head coach of the El Salvador (Under 17) and Under 15 national football team. In December 2015, Henríquez resigned, being replaced by Erick Dowson Prado.

=== Marte Soyapango ===
In 2014, Henríquez signed as coach of Marte Soyapango.

=== Return to UES ===
Henríquez signed as new coach of UES again in the Clausura 2016 tournament, replacing Efraín Burgos. Henríquez had the mission to save the scarlet team from the descent. His first official match in his return was a 0–3 defeat against Alianza in the Estadio Cuscatlán.

The team was immersed in an economic and sports crisis. Despite an initial streak of matches without winning (5 games), UES defeated Atlético Marte 1–0 in the Estadio Jorge "Mágico" González and began to add points that in the end were crucial to save the descent.

Henríquez started coaching the team in the Apertura 2016 tournament. His first match was 1–2 defeat against FAS in the Estadio Universitario. Then the team suffered a streak of matches without winning (11 games) and after a 1–3 against FAS in the Estadio Cuscatlán he left the team, being replaced by Efraín Burgos.

Henríquez coaching the team in 37 games.

=== Independiente FC ===
In August 2017, Henríquez signed as new coach of Independiente FC, replacing Rubén Alonso. His goal was to promote the team of San Vicente to the Primera División. However, he remained on the team until December of the same year.

=== Return to Vendaval ===
In 2018, Henríquez signed as new coach of Vendaval, again.

== Honours ==
- Primera División de Fútbol de El Salvador: 5

1989, 1991, 1992, 1993, 1996

== Managerial stats ==
Team	Nat	From	To	Record				
Team	Nat	From	To	G	W	D	L	%
TBD	El Salvador	TBD	TBD	0	0	0	0	%
TBD	El Salvador	TBD	TBD	0	0	0	0	%
TBD	El Salvador	TBD	TBD	0	0	0	0	%
TBD	El Salvador	TBD	TBD	0	0	0	0	%
Chalatenango	El Salvador	June 2022	December 2022	0	0	0	0	%
