= Jucuapa =

District in Usulután Department, El Salvador

Coordinates: 13°31′N 88°23′W

Jucuapa is a district of the municipality of Usulután Norte in the department of Usulután, El Salvador. According to the official census of 2024, it has a population of approximately 17,696 inhabitants. Jucuapa is the capital of the municipality of Usulután Norte.

== Sports ==
The local football club is C.D. Aspirante which plays in the Salvadoran Second Division.
