= Jorge Ábrego =

Salvadoran football player (born 1964)

Personal information
- Full name: Jorge Alberto Ábrego Martínez
- Date of birth: October 8, 1964 (age 62)
- Place of birth: Santa Ana, El Salvador
- Position: Defender

Senior career*
Years	Team	Apps	(Gls)
1983–1999	C.D. FAS		

International career
1984–1993	El Salvador	49	(1)

Managerial career
- 2003–2004: C.D. FAS (reserves)
- 2006–2007: C.D. FAS (assistant)
- 2008: Juventud Independiente
- 2008–2009: Once Municipal
- 2010: Titán
- 2010: C.D. FAS
- 2011: UES (assistant)
- 2012–2013: UES
- 2015: Real Destroyer
- 2015: Juventud Independiente
- 2016: Pasaquina (assistant)
- 2016: C.D. Audaz
- 2016–2017: Atlético Comalapa
- 2018: Topiltzín
- 2018–2020: Platense
- 2023-2024: Platense
- 2024-Present: Santiagueno F.C.
- * Club domestic league appearances and goals

Jorge Alberto Ábrego Martínez (born 16 October 1964) is a Salvadoran former professional football player and currently the manager of third division team Santiagueno F.C.

== Playing career ==
=== Playing career ===
Nicknamed El Zapatero (The Shoemaker), Ábrego has played all of his professional career at FAS.

== Coaching career ==
After he retired, Ábrego became a football manager.

=== Juventud Independiente ===
In 2008, Ábrego signed as coach of Juventud Independiente.

=== Once Municipal ===
In June 2008, Ábrego signed as coach of Once Municipal, replacing Mario Elias Guevara. In October 2009, Ábrego was replaced by Nelson Mauricio Ancheta.

=== Titán de Texistepeque ===
In 2010, Ábrego signed as new coach of Titán.

=== FAS ===
In September 2010, Ábrego was confirmed as new coach of FAS, replacing Alberto Rujana. Ábrego left the club in December 2010.

=== UES ===
In September 2011, Ábrego as coach of the juvenile team of UES, along with Miguel Ángel Soriano, replaced Eraldo Correia. In January 2012, Ábrego was replaced by Roberto Gamarra.

=== Return to UES ===
In October 2012, Ábrego signed as coach of UES, replacing Roberto Gamarra. In March 2013, Ábrego was replaced by assistant coach Miguel Ángel Díaz.

=== Real Destroyer ===
In February 2015, Ábrego signed as coach of Real Destroyer, replacing Jorge Calles. In June 2015, Ábrego was replaced by Jorge Calles himself.

=== Return to Juventud Independiente ===
In June 2015, Ábrego signed again as coach of Juventud Independiente.

=== Pasaquina ===
In December 2015, Ábrego was confirmed as new assistant coach of Pasaquina for the Clausura 2016 tournament.

=== Audaz ===
In September 2016, Ábrego signed as coach of Audaz, replacing René Angulo. In December 2016, Ábrego left the club.

=== Atlético Comalapa ===
In December 2016, Ábrego signed as coach of Atlético Comalapa, replacing Pablo Quiñónez. In November 2017, Ábrego was replaced by German Pérez.

=== Topiltzín ===
In January 2018, Ábrego signed as coach of Topiltzín for the Clausura 2018, replacing Sebastián Hernández. In May 2018, Ábrego was replaced by Manuel Carranza Murillo.

=== Platense ===
Ábrego signed as new coach of Platense in 2018. In December 2018, Platense reached the finals of the Apertura 2018 of Segunda División.

=== International ===
Ábrego made his debut for El Salvador in 1984, and has earned well over 40 caps.

He has played in three World Cup qualification series, for the 1986, 1990 and 1994 World Cup finals. He also played at the 1993 UNCAF Nations Cup.

Ábrego's final international was a May 1993 FIFA World Cup qualification match against Canada.

== Honours ==
=== Player ===
==== Club ====
C.D. FAS

- Primera División
  - Champion: 1984, 1994–95, 1995–96
  - Runners-up: Clausura 1999

==== Club ====
Real Destroyer

- Segunda División
  - Champion: Clausura 2015
