= C.D. Topiltzín =

Association football club in El Salvador

Club Deportivo Topiltzín Jiquilisco
- Full name: Club Deportivo Topiltzín
- Founded: 1978; 48 years ago, as Club Deportivo Topiltzin
- Ground: Estadio Topilzín, Jiquilisco, El Salvador
- Manager: Sebastian Hernandez
- League: Segunda División Salvadorean
Home colours

Club Deportivo Topiltzín was a Salvadoran professional football club based at Jiquilisco, Usulután in El Salvador.

== History ==
In 1978, Topiltzin was founded. In 2013, Toplitzin won their first title in the tercero division winning 2–1 over Huracan in Apertura. On the 14th of January 2018, due to failed payment, the club was de-registered from the Segunda Division.

== Honours ==
=== Domestic ===
- Tercera División Salvadorean and predecessors
  - Champions (1): Apertura 2013

== Squad (2023) ==
Note: Flags indicate national team as defined under FIFA eligibility rules; some limited exceptions apply. Players may hold more than one non-FIFA nationality.

No.	Pos.	Nation	Player
4	DF	SLV	Nahum Portillo
6		SLV	Geovanni Sigaran
7	MF	SLV	Darwin Nieto
8	MF	SLV	Fernando Torres
10		COL	Marcos Gallego
11	MF	SLV	Melvin Alfaro
12	MF	SLV	Andres Alfaro
14		SLV	Allan Alfaro

No.	Pos.	Nation	Player
16	DF	SLV	Walter Garay
21	MF	SLV	Jorge Martinez
22	GK	SLV	Angel Joya
25	GK	SLV	Daniel Gutierrez
27	MF	SLV	Rudy Batres
33	MF	SLV	Angel Murillo
34	MF	SLV	Jefferson Ulloa
35	DF	SLV	Diego Hernandez

== Notable players ==
- (El Salvador) Carlos Ayala
- (El Salvador) Erber Burgos
- (El Salvador) José Manuel Martinez
- (Honduras) Pompilio Cacho

== List of coaches ==
Years	Name	Nation
1999	Carlos Reyes	Uruguay
2000–2004	Mauricio Amaya	El Salvador
2005	Roberto Hernandez	El Salvador
2006	Mauricio Amaya	El Salvador
2010–2011	Miguel Aguilar Obando	El Salvador
2011	Edgar Henriquez "Kiko"	El Salvador
2011–2012	Abraham Vásquez "Peñero"	El Salvador
2013–2014	Roberto Hernandez	El Salvador
2015	Mauricio Amaya	El Salvador
January–March 2016	Alfredo Juarez	El Salvador
March 2016–December 2017	Sebastian Hernandez	El Salvador
January–May 2018	Jorge Abrego	El Salvador
July–December 2018	Manuel Carranza Murillo	El Salvador
August–December 2019	Sebastian Hernandez	El Salvador
January–March 2020	Efrain Solano	Colombia
March 2020	Jorge Calles	El Salvador
April–September 2021	Giovanni Trigueros	El Salvador
September 2021–May 2022	Sebastian Hernandez	El Salvador
June–December 2022	Ervin Loza	El Salvador
January–September 2023	Giovanni Trigueros	El Salvador
October–November 2023	Eraldo Correia	Brazil
