= San Rafael Cedros =

- District
- Location in El Salvador
- Coordinates: 13°44′N 88°53′W
- Country: El Salvador
- Department: Cuscatlán Department
- Elevation: 2,323 ft (708 m)

Population (2024)
  - District: 16,303
  - Rank: 86th in El Salvador
  - Urban: 15,572
  - Rural: 731

San Rafael Cedros is a municipality in the Cuscatlán department of El Salvador. It is located near the capital.
