= CD Aspirante =

Association football club in El Salvador

Aspirante
- Full name: Club Deportivo Aspirante
- Nickname: Los Pumas
- Founded: 18 May 1958; 67 years ago
- Ground: Estadio Municipal de Jucuapa; Jucuapa, El Salvador
- Capacity: 5,000
- Chairman: William Guzmán
- League: Liga de Plata Salvadoreña
- 2018: Torneo Clausura 2018
Home colours

Club Deportivo Aspirante is a Salvadoran professional football club based in Jucuapa, Usulután, El Salvador.

== History ==
C.D. Aspirante was formed on 18 May 1958 by Rafael Gálvez. In 2001, they won promotion to the second tier of Salvadoran football. Their greatest achievement was just missing promotion to the Salvadoran Premier Division after a 2–1 loss to Chalatenango in 2003. Before the tournament, Aspirantes created a new administration, and Mr. Manuel Turcios was named the new President of the Club. One of Mr. Turcio's first steps was to hire a new coach, Professor Mario Martínez. After agreeing to his contract terms, Martínez started recruiting players in the district to form the basis of the team that would come so close to achieving promotion. However, due to poor results and dealing with the local supporters, Martínez handed in his resignation, and despite the setback, the club would just miss out on promotion. After the success, the club has mainly stayed midtable, failing to achieve the heights they had once reached.

== Honours ==
=== Domestic honours ===
- Segunda División Salvadorean and predecessors
- Runners-up (1) : 2003
- Tercera División Salvadorean and predecessors
  - Champions:(1) : 2001

== List of coaches ==
- (El Salvador) Miguel Aguilar Obando (2000)
- (El Salvador) Mauro Abel Parada (2001)
- (El Salvador) Mario Martínez (2002)
- (El Salvador) Manuel de la Paz Palacios (2002–03)
- (Brazil) Eraldo Correia (2003)
- (El Salvador) Oscar Emigdio Benítez (2003)
- (El Salvador) Víctor "El Toba" Girón
- (Colombia) Luis Marines
- (El Salvador) Esteban Melara
- (El Salvador) Carlos Mario Joya (2011–2012)
- (Honduras) Efraín Núñez (2012)
- (El Salvador) Carlos Romero (2012–2013)
- (El Salvador) Joaquín Pérez (2013–2014)
- (El Salvador) Carlos Mario Joya (2014–2015)
- (El Salvador) Carlos Romero (2015)
- (El Salvador) Miguel Aguilar Obando (June 2015–Aug 2015)
- (El Salvador) Mauro Abel Parada (Aug 2015- July 2016)
- (El Salvador) Joaquin Perez (July 2016- June 2017)
- (El Salvador) Victor Giron (July 2017 - Sep 2017)
- (Brazil) Eduardo Santana (Oct 2017-Feb 2018)
- (El Salvador) Oscar David Ramirez (July 2018-Sep 2018)
- (El Salvador) José Mario Martínez (Sep 2018-July 2019)
- (El Salvador) Willian Chevez (July 2019 - December 2019)
- (El Salvador) Sebastian Hernandez Sigaran (January 2020 - February 2020)
- (El Salvador) Carlos Martinez (February 2020 - June 2020)
- (El Salvador) Jorge Calles (July 2020 - January 2021)
- (Argentina) Carlos Che Martinez (January 2021 - June 2021)
- (El Salvador) Samael Virgil (August 2021 - Present)
