= C.D. El Roble =

Association football club in El Salvador

El Roble
- Full name: El Roble de Ilobasco
- Founded: 1989
- Ground: Estadio Mauricio Vides
- Chairman: Gerardo Abarco
- Manager: Jorge Abrego
- League: Liga de Ascenso
Home colours	Away colours

El Roble de Ilobasco (formerly known as Asociación de Futbolistas de Ilobasco) is a Salvadoran football club based in Ilobasco in the Cabañas department of El Salvador. The club currently plays in the Liga de Ascenso.

== History ==
=== El Roble ===
The club was founded in 1989, during the early years the club were able to achieve promotion to the primera division in 1993, they played in the primera division between 1994 and 1998

=== Rebrand A.F.I. and close to promotion ===
The club was renamed in 2005 to A.F.I., Asociación de Futbolistas de Ilobasco.

After a strong season which ended with the club winning the 2009 Clausura Segunda division title, the club reached promotion-relegation promotion two legged series match against Alianza. The first match played in the Estadio Mauricio Vides de Ilobasco ended in a 1-1 draw with the sole goal for the club coming from José Luis Amaya. The second game finished 3-1 in favour for Alianza, with the sole goal coming from José Luis Amaya again. The series ended 4-2 in favour of Alianza and would be last time the club came close to promotion as AFI.

=== Recent events ===
However in 2010, it reverted to being called El Roble. The club spent most of its time in the Second Division, with a few years in Primera Division de Futbol Profesional (1994–1998).

In 2018, El Roble de Ilobasco due to Financial problem were forced to sell their spot in the segunda division and eventually dissolved.

They currently play in the Tercera Division.

== Honours ==
=== League ===
- Segunda Division and predecessors
  - Champions (2): 1992–1993, Clausura 2009
- Tercera Division and predecessors
  - Champions (1): 2026 Clausura (Centro-Oriente)
  - Play-off winner (1): 2025-2026

== Kit manufacturers and shirt sponsors ==
Period	Company (sponsors)
1994–1995	(United States) Pony
1995–1996	(Italy) Lotto
2024	(El Salvador) KS Sport
2025–present	(El Salvador) MACA (Mia Sport, INDES, Hotel Sueno)

== Stadium ==
- Cancha Mauricio Vides de Ilobasco (2002–present)

== Squad (2023) ==
Note: Flags indicate national team as defined under FIFA eligibility rules; some limited exceptions apply. Players may hold more than one non-FIFA nationality.

No.	Pos.	Nation	Player
1	GK	SLV	Francisco Saravia
2	DF	SLV	Diego Chávez
3	DF	SLV	Daniel Roque
4	DF	SLV	Harrison Valladares
5	DF	SLV	Fernando Quintanilla
6	MF	SLV	Andres González
7	FW	SLV	Julio Rivera
8	MF	SLV	Óscar Paz
9	FW	COL	Jonny Morán
11	FW	SLV	Alexis Ramos
12	MF	SLV	Flavio Mayora
13	DF	SLV	Óscar Morán Molina
16	DF	COL	Wilson Andrés Ángulo

No.	Pos.	Nation	Player
17	FW	SLV	Ernesto Crespin
19	FW	SLV	Jefferson Martínez
20	MF	SLV	Andres Prado
21	FW	SLV	Nelson Barrios
25	MF	SLV	Aldair Rivera
26	DF	SLV	Alfredo Vega
27	FW	SLV	Levis Martínez
30	GK	SLV	Steven Argueta
32	MF	SLV	Nayson Cuellar
33	DF	SLV	Sergio Castillo
34	DF	SLV	Mauricio Ayala
35	DF	SLV	Cesar Rodríguez
39	FW	SLV	Alexander Molina
40	GK	SLV	Brayan Merino

== List of notable players ==
- (El Salvador) Edgar Henríquez
- (El Salvador) Carlos Eduardo Rivera
- (El Salvador) Julio Ernesto Hernández (1996)
- (El Salvador) Guillermo García (1989–1996)
- (El Salvador) José Salvador Portillo (1996)
- (El Salvador) (Brazil) Celio Rodríguez (1996–1997)

=== Captains ===
Years	Captain
1994	(El Salvador) Elmer Pena (FW)
2015	(El Salvador) Lino Rivas
2023–	(El Salvador) Aldair Rivera (FW)

== List of coaches ==
El Roble (1989–2008), (2012–2018), (2023-present)

- (Uruguay) Carlos Jurado (1991–92)
- (El Salvador) Conrado Miranda (1993 – September 1995)
- (El Salvador) Luis Angel León (September 1995 – January 1996)
- (El Salvador) Conrado Miranda (January - March 1996)
- (El Salvador) Víctor Manuel Pacheco (March 1996 – October 1997)
- (Costa Rica) Didier Castro (October 1997 – February 1998)
- (El Salvador) Luis Landos (February – April 1998)
- (Uruguay) Carlos Jurado (April – May 1998)
- (El Salvador) Jose Luis Siu (May 1998 – 1999)
- (El Salvador) Guillermo Navarro (2002)
- (El Salvador) Ricardo Mena Laguán (2003)
- (El Salvador) Carlos Antonio Meléndez (2011 – 2012)
- (El Salvador) Juan Ramon Paredes (2012 – 2013)
- (El Salvador) Guillermo Navarro (2013 – 2014)
- (El Salvador) Ramón Avilés (2014)
- (El Salvador) Victor Coreas (September 2014 – July 2015)
- (El Salvador) Victor Giron (July – August 2015)
- (El Salvador) Fausto Vasquez (August 2015 – 2017)
- (El Salvador) Victor Coreas (2017 – 2018)
- (El Salvador) Lazaro Gutierrez (July – October 2023)
- (El Salvador) Omar David Sevilla (October – December 2023)
- (Uruguay) Rubén da Silva (January – July 2024)
- (El Salvador) Jorge Abrego (August – December 2025)
- (El Salvador) Miguel Ángel Soriano (December 2025 – January 2026)
- (Uruguay) Rubén da Silva (February 2026 – July 2026)
- (El Salvador) Efrain Burgos (August 2026 – present)

AFI (2009–2011)

- (El Salvador) Miguel Ángel Soriano (−2009)
- (El Salvador) Luis Ángel León (2009 – 2010)
- (El Salvador) Víctor Coreas (2010)
- (El Salvador) Miguel Ángel Soriano (2010 – 2011)

=== Notable managers ===
The following managers have won at least one trophy while in charge at El Roble:

Name	Nationality	From	To	Honours
Miguel Ángel Soriano	El Salvador	18 February 2009	1 July 2009	1 Segunda División Salvadorean (Clausura 2009) 1 Promotional playoff runnersup (2008-2009)
Rubén da Silva	Uruguay	18 February 2026	1 July 2026	1 Tercera Division (2026 Clausura) 1 Promotional playoff champion (2025-2026)
