= Víctor Coreas =

Salvadoran footballer and manager (born 1963)

Personal information
- Full name: Víctor Manuel Coreas Privado
- Date of birth: March 30, 1963 (age 63)
- Place of birth: Quelepa, El Salvador
- Position: Defender

Senior career*
Years	Team	Apps	(Gls)
- CD Vendaval
- CD Águila
1989–1990	CD Luis Ángel Firpo		
1991–1996	CD Municipal Limeño		

International career
1989–1992	El Salvador		

Managerial career
- 2003: CD Municipal Limeño (assistant coach)
- 2007: CD Vista Hermosa (assistant coach)
- 2008–2009: CD Vista Hermosa
- 2009–2010: CD Municipal Limeño
- 2010: El Roble
- 2010–2011: CD Vista Hermosa
- 2012–2013: CD Águila
- 2014: CD Liberal
- 2014–2015: El Roble
- 2015: Pasaquina FC
- 2017: CD Dragón
- 2017–2018: El Roble
- 2018: CD Municipal Limeño
- 2019: CD Chagüite
- 2019: CD El Vencedor
- 2020: AD Isidro Metapán
- 2021: Jocoro
- 2023: Corinto FC
- 2023-2025: Jocoro
- 2025 - Present: Cacahuatique
- * Club domestic league appearances and goals

Víctor Manuel Coreas Privado (born 30 March 1963 in Quelepa) is a former Salvadoran professional football player and currently manager.

He is the brother of former international player Salvador Coreas Privado.

== Club career ==
Coreas has spent his playing career at Vendaval, Águila and Municipal Limeño.

== International career ==
Coreas has represented El Salvador in 1 FIFA World Cup qualification match, against the United States in November 1989.

== Managerial career ==
=== Municipal Limeño ===
After retiring as a player at Municipal Limeño, Coreas was assistant coach at the club.

=== Vista Hermosa ===
He then worked at Vista Hermosa between 2007 and 2009, before being sacked and returned to Municipal Limeño in August 2009 to replace Miguel Aguilar Obando.

=== Return to Vista Hermosa ===
In December 2010, he was again appointed coach of Vista Hermosa.

=== Águila ===
At the start of 2012, he was appointed head coach of Águila and in his first tournament as coach of the team of San Miguel he took them to their first title since 2006 (and their 15th title in their history).

=== Pasaquina ===
In June 2015, Coreas signed as new coach of Pasaquina, replacing Juan Andrés Sarulyte. In December 2015, Coreas left the club and was replaced by Hugo Ovelar.

=== Dragón ===
In March 2017, Coreas signed as new coach of Dragón for the rest of the Clausura 2017, replacing Nelson Mauricio Ancheta. In October 2018, Coreas was replaced by Omar Sevilla.

However, after only coaching two games, Coreas resigned and was replaced by Henry Vanegas.

=== Return to El Roble ===
In 2017, Coreas signed again as new coach of El Roble.

=== Return to Municipal Limeño ===
In March 2018, Coreas signed as new coach of Municipal Limeño, replacing Wilfredo Molina.

== Achievements ==
Year	Finish	Team	Tournament	Role	Notes
1983	Champion	Águila	1st Division El Salvador	Player	
2012	Champion	Águila	1st Division El Salvador	Coach	He becomes the sixth player to win a title as player and coach of Águila

== Managerial stats ==
Team	Nat	From	To	Record				
Team	Nat	From	To	G	W	D	L	%
Municipal Limeño	El Salvador	2003	2003	1	0	0	1	0
Municipal Limeño	El Salvador	August 2009	January 2010	4	0	0	4	00.00
Vista Hermosa	El Salvador	2008	March 2009	39	14	13	12	44.00
Vista Hermosa	El Salvador	December 2010	November 2011	32	7	15	10	37.00
Aguila	El Salvador	2012	2013	52	21	10	21	0
Pasaquina	El Salvador	June 2015	December 2015	24	0	0	0	0
Municipal Limeño	El Salvador	March 2018	October 2018	25	6	11	8	38%
Jocoro	El Salvador	August 2021	December 2021	0	0	0	0	%
Jocoro	El Salvador	February 2023	March 2025	0	0	0	0	%
Cacahuatique	El Salvador	March 2025	Present	0	0	0	0	%
