= A.D. Apopa =

Salvadoran football club

AD Apopa
- Full name: Asociación Deportiva Apopa
- Nickname: Tigres Dientes de Sable
- Founded: 2015
- Ground: Estadio Municipal de Apopa; Apopa, El Salvador
- Capacity: 5,000
- Chairman: Junta Directiva
- Manager: Prof. Marcos Portillo
- League: Liga de Plata Salvadoreña
- Apertura 2015: Apertura 2015 Grupo "A"
Home colours	Away colours

Asociación Deportiva Apopa is a professional soccer team of the El Salvadorian city of Apopa.

== History ==
In 2015, the club was granted a license to compete in the newly expanded segunda division El Salvador.

== Rivalry ==
Apopa's current biggest rivalry was with fellow and Older Apopa based team C.D. Vendaval, against whom they contest the derby Apopense.

== List of coaches ==
El Salvador:

- (El Salvador) Marcos Antonio Portillo (2015–)
