= A.D. Leones de Occidente =

Salvadoran football club

- Full name: Asociación Deportiva Leones de Occidente
- Founded: 2015–
- League: Segunda División
Home colours

Asociación Deportiva Leones de Occidente are a Salvadoran professional football club based in Metapán, El Salvador.

== Recent history ==
- Segunda División: 2015–

== List of coaches ==
- (El Salvador) Edwin Portillo (July 2015 – Oct 2015)
- (El Salvador) Samuel Maldonado (Oct 2015 – June 2016)
- (Chile) Héctor Jara (July 2016– Oct 2016)
- (El Salvador) Edwin Portillo (Oct 2016–)
