= C.D. Fuerte San Francisco =

Association football club in El Salvador

Fuerte San Francisco
- Full name: Club Deportivo Fuerte San Francisco
- Nicknames: Los Comandos Azules; Los Morazanicos
- Founded: 8 January 1953; 73 years ago
- Stadium: Estadio Correcaminos
- Chairman: (El Salvador) Paul Guzman
- Manager: (Uruguay) Pablo Quiñones
- League: (El Salvador) Primera División
- 2026 Clausura: Overall: 11th Playoffs: Did not qualify
- Website: https://clubdeportivofuerte.com/
Home colours	Away colours	Third colours

Club Deportivo Fuerte San Francisco is a football club based in San Francisco Gotera, El Salvador that plays in the Primera División, the top flight of Salvadoran football. Nicknamed Los Comandos Azules (The blue commanders), the club has won two league second division titles, Seven third divisions titles and one promotional titles.

== History ==
The club was founded on the 8th of January, 1953 and began their league journey Liga Federada in 1954 with their first president being Enrique Ferrufino In 1991, Fuerte San Francisco obtained promotion to the Primera División de Fútbol Profesional for the first and so far only time and managed to stay there for three years. The club was relegated from the Primera División de Fútbol de El Salvador after 1992/1993 season. In 2009 they were relegated to the Third Division. However, after winning both the Apertura 2014 and Clausura 2015 title Fuerte San Francisco were promoted to the Segunda Division for 2015–2016 seasons.

The team remained in the second tier until the 2022-23 season, when they secured their first promotion to the Primera Division in 30 years after defeatingTitan in the promotion play-offs.

== Rivalries ==
The team's main historic and geographic rival is C.D. Vista Hermosa. The rivalry stems from the two teams being based in Morazán and regular competing to be promoted to the primera division. However the clubs have not played each other since Vista became defunct for a few years before being reborn in the ADFA Morazán (Fourth tier) of El Salvador.

== Kit history ==
=== Jersey suppliers ===
Manufacturer	Period	Sponsor	Notes
(Japan) Mikasa Sports	1974–1975	None	
(England) Umbro	1975–1976	None	
(El Salvador) Milàn Sport	1976–1983	None	
None	1984–2006	(El Salvador) Gigante Express	
(El Salvador) Aviva	2007–2012	(El Salvador) Gotus, (El Salvador) Balazar Liz, (United States) Rinso	
(El Salvador) Milàn Sport	2014–present	(El Salvador) Gotus	
(El Salvador) TBD	2019–2020	(El Salvador) Gotus (El Salvador) Caja Credito San Francisco Gotera (El Salvador) Agua Las Perlitas	
(El Salvador) J&M Bordados Sublimacion	2021–2023	(El Salvador) Achorra Express (El Salvador) Tegs (El Salvador) Chicharronera Y Carnicera	
(El Salvador) Innova Sport	2023–2024	(El Salvador) Agua Las Perlitas (El Salvador) Padilla desde 1960 (El Salvador) Rosticeria (Mexico) Electrolit (El Salvador) Salvador express (El Salvador) TEGO	
(El Salvador) J&M Bordados Sublimacion	2025-2026	(El Salvador) Torque Digital (El Salvador) Padilla desde 1960 (Mexico) Electrolit (El Salvador) Pupuseria Roxy	
(El Salvador) Kapitan	2026-Present	(El Salvador) Padilla desde 1960 (Mexico) Electrolit	

== Stadium ==
The team's home venue is the Estadio Correcaminos with a capacity of 12,000. Which used to be the home of Vista Hermosa, However, after the team become defunct Fuerte San Francisco took over as the sole tenant. They previously played at the Estadio Luis Amílcar Moreno in San Francisco Gotera. They share the stadium with Vista Hermosa.

- Estadio Luis Amílcar Moreno (1998−2012)
- Estadio Correcaminos (2013–Present)

== Honours ==
=== Domestic honours ===
- Segunda División Salvadorean and predecessors
  - Champions (2): 1991, 2022 Apertura
  - Play-off winners: 2022–23
- Tercera División Salvadorean and predecessors
  - Champions (7): 1974, 1978, Apertura 2001, Apertura 2013, Apertura 2014, Apertura 2015, Clausura 2015
- Liga Afederada Salvadoreña:
  - Champions (1): Clausura 1949

== Club records ==
- First victory in the Primera Division for Fuerte San Francisco: 2-1 TBD, August 17, 2019
- First goalscorer for Fuerte San Francisco: TBA v TBD, August 10, 2019
- First goalscorer in the Primera Division for Fuerte San Francisco: TBA v TBD, August 10, 2019
- Largest Home victory, Primera División: 3-0 v TBD, 9 March 2020
- Largest Away victory, Primera División: 4-0 TBD, November 18, 2019
- Largest Home loss, Primera División: 4-0 v TBD, 25 August 2019
- Largest Away loss, Primera División: 0-6 TBD, 18 October 2020.
- Highest home attendance: 2,000 v Primera División, 2018
- Highest away attendance: 1,000 v Primera División, San Salvador, 2018
- Highest average attendance, season: 00,000, Primera División
- Most goals scored, TBD season, Primera División: 21, TBD, 2018
- Worst season: Primera Division Apertura 2019: 3 win, 5 draws and 14 losses (14 points)
- First CONCACAF Champions League match: N/A

=== Individual records ===
- Record appearances (all competitions): TBD, 89 from 2019 to Present
- Record appearances (Primera Division): Salvadoran TBD, 89 from 2019 to Present
- Most capped player for El Salvador: 63 (0 whilst at Fuerte San Francisco), TBD
- Most international caps for El Salvador while a Fuerte San Francisco player: 2, TBD.
- Most caps won whilst at Fuerte San Francisco: 2, TBD.
- Record scorer in league: TBD, 16
- Most goals in a season (all competitions): TBD, 62 (1927/28) (47 in League, 15 in Cup competitions)
- Most goals in a season (Primera Division): TBD, 12
- All time Record goal scorer (Primera Division): Rubén Alonso, 34
- First goal scorer in International competition: N/A

=== Top goalscorers ===
No.	Player	period	Goals
	(El Salvador) TBD	TBD-TBD	TBD
	(El Salvador) TBD	TBD-TBD	TBD
	(El Salvador) TBD	TBD-TBD	TBD
	(El Salvador) TBD	TBD-TBD	TBD
	(El Salvador) TBD	TBD-TBD	TBD
	(El Salvador) TBD	TBD-TBD	TBD
	(El Salvador) TBD	TBD-TBD	TBD
	(El Salvador) TBD	TBD-TBD	TBD
	(El Salvador) Alexander Marquez	2020-2022	40
	(Uruguay) Rubén Alonso	1991-1992	31
	(Honduras) Jorge Martínez Ugalde	1992-1993	17

Note: Players in bold text are still active with Fuerte San Francisco

=== Overall seasons table in Primera División de Fútbol Profesional ===
As of 2 July 2023n

Pos.	Club	Season In D1	Pl.	W	D	L	GS	GA	Dif.
**TBA**	**Fuerte San Francisco**	**3**	109	25	43	41	112	147	-35

== Players ==
=== Current squad ===
As of July 2026

Note: Flags indicate national team as defined under FIFA eligibility rules; some limited exceptions apply. Players may hold more than one non-FIFA nationality.

No.	Pos.	Nation	Player
2		SLV	Xavi Rivas
3	DF	SLV	Edwin Córdova
4	DF	SLV	Walter Guevara
5	DF	BRA	Vinicius Santana
6	DF	SLV	Francisco Escobar
7	MF	SLV	Ronald Aparicio
8	MF	SLV	Jordy Bonilla
9	FW	PAN	Joshua Gallardo
10	FW	PAN	Ángel Caicedo
11	MF	SLV	Jonathan Ramos
14	MF	SLV	Wilson Rugamas
15	DF	SLV	Giovanni Avila
16	MF	ECU	Yossimar Rodriguez
17		SLV	Emerson Mancia
19	DF	SLV	Alexis Renderos
20	DF	SLV	Juan Benitez
21	FW	COL	Carlos Salazar
22	GK	SLV	Héctor Carbajal
23	FW	SLV	Oscar Molina
25	GK	SLV	Tony Iglesias
26	MF	SLV	Carlos Alejandro Martinez
27		SLV	Fernando Clavel
30		SLV	Julio Garcia
33	MF	SLV	Adriel Sorto
35	MF	SLV	Antony Peña
—	MF	SLV	Jonhan Chavarria
—	DF	SLV	Kevin Oviedo
—	DF	SLV	Eduardo Châvez

No.	Pos.	Nation	Player
24	DF	SLV	Alexander Rodriguez
36	MF	SLV	Alejandro Guevara
45	FW	SLV	Jeffrey Sosa
99	FW	SLV	Leandro Perez

=== In ===
Note: Flags indicate national team as defined under FIFA eligibility rules; some limited exceptions apply. Players may hold more than one non-FIFA nationality.

No.	Pos.	Nation	Player
—	MF	SLV	Ronald Aparicio (From Inter Santa Tecla)
—	MF	SLV	Francisco Escobar (From Inter Santa Tecla)
—	DF	SLV	Giovanni Avila (From Isidro Metapan)
—	DF	BRA	Vinicius Santana (From Porto Sport Club)
—	MF	BRA	Rafael Holstein (From Immigration F.C.)
—	FW	COL	Carlos Salazar (From Alianza)
—		SLV	Alexis Renderos (From Inter Santa Tecla )

No.	Pos.	Nation	Player
—	DF	SLV	Oscar Molina (From Zacatecoluca)
—	GK	SLV	Héctor Carbajal (From Inter Santa Tecla)
—		SLV	Jonathan Quintanilla (From Cacahuatique)
—		PAN	Ángel Caicedo (From CA Independiente)
—	MF	SLV	Jordy Bonilla (From Municipal Limeno)
—	MF	ECU	Yosimar Rodriguez (from Free Agents)

=== Out ===
Note: Flags indicate national team as defined under FIFA eligibility rules; some limited exceptions apply. Players may hold more than one non-FIFA nationality.

No.	Pos.	Nation	Player
—		SLV	Jonathan Funes (To TBD)
—		SLV	Emilio Gonzalez (To TBD)
—	DF	ARG	Cristian Belucci (To TBD)
—	MF	SLV	Edwin Sanchez (To TBD)
—	MF	SLV	Walter Chigüila (To Aguila)
—		SLV	Melvin Cruz (To Isidro Metapan)
—	FW	ECU	Dany Cetré (To Cacahuatique)

No.	Pos.	Nation	Player
—	DF	SLV	Giuviny Esquivel (To TBD)
—		SLV	Rene Granados (To TBD)
—	MF	SLV	Robin Borjas (To TBD)
—	MF	SLV	Fabricio Torres (To TBD)
—		SLV	Enrique Rivas (To TBD)
—		SLV	Jonathan Hernandez (To TBD)
—		BRA	Rafael Holstein (Visa Issues)

== Coaching staff ==
As of July 2026

Position	Name
Head Coach	(El Salvador) Omar Sevilla (*)
Assistant coach	(El Salvador) Marvin Rosales (*)
Goalkeeper coach	(El Salvador) Kristhian Reyes (*)
Fitness coach	(El Salvador) Rafael Mariona (*)
Team Doctor	(El Salvador) Dr. Jose Alexander Martinez (*)
Physiotherapist	(El Salvador) Alex Bolaños (*)
Kineslogist	(El Salvador) Monica Cabrera (*)
Utility	(El Salvador) Isais Hernandez (*)
Reserve coach	(El Salvador) Rolando Torres (*)
Reserve Assistant coach	(El Salvador) Rafael Mariona (*)
Ladies coach	(El Salvador) Walter Morales (*)
Reserve Assistant Ladies and Under 17 coach	(El Salvador) José de la Paz (*)
Under 17 coach	(El Salvador) Walter Morales (*)
Sporting director	(El Salvador) Kelvin Argueta

== Notable players ==
Note: this list includes players that have appeared in at least 100 league games and/or have reached international status.

- (El Salvador) Pablo Martinez “La Perla Negra”
- (El Salvador) Victor Coreas
- (El Salvador) Luis Amilcar Moreno
- (El Salvador) Sergio Ivan Munoz
- (El Salvador) Rolando Torres
- (El Salvador) (Colombia) Elder Figueroa
- (El Salvador) Marlon Medrano
- (El Salvador) Osmel Zapata
- (El Salvador) Omar Sevilla
- (El Salvador) Agustin Aguilar (Died, December 2. 2007)
- (Honduras) Jorge Martínez Ugalde
- (Panama) Erick Ortega
- (Uruguay) Ruben Alonso
- (Uruguay) Raul Esnal
- (Uruguay) Gustavo Faral

=== Captains ===
Years	Captain
1984	(El Salvador) Victor Coreas (DF)
1984	(El Salvador) Amilcar Moreno (DF)
1990-1991	(El Salvador) Jaime Cotorro Gonzalez (DF)
1991	(Uruguay) Ruben Alonso (FW)
1992	(El Salvador) Carlos Francisco Aragon (DF)
2022	(Trinidad and Tobago) TBD (FW)
2023-2024	(El Salvador) Francisco Carballo (DF)
2024-2025	(El Salvador) Felipe Amaya (GK)
2025-Present	(El Salvador) Wilson Rugamas (MF)

== Non-playing staff ==
=== Management ===
As of July 16, 2026

Position	Name
Owner	(El Salvador) Asociacion Deportiva de Morazán
President	(El Salvador) Wilbert Argueta
Vice-President	(El Salvador) Rómulo Gómez
Gerente Deportivo	(El Salvador) Ing. Jose Fausto
Administrative Director	(El Salvador) Scr. Yanira Argueta
Deputy managing director	(El Salvador) Sr. José Batallon
Executive Director	(El Salvador) Sr. Henry Giron
Secretary General	(El Salvador) Guadalupe Platero
Sporting director	(El Salvador)
General director	(El Salvador) Jorge Coreas
Team Photographer	(El Salvador) Enrique Costa

== Kit evolution ==
Home:Full Uniform from Season 1953 FSF	Home:Full Uniform from Season 1980 FSF	Home:Full Uniform from Season 1988 FSF	Full Uniform from Season 1987 FSF	Full Uniform from Season 2005 FSF	Full Uniform from Season 2005–present	C.D. Fuerte San Francisco Azul year 2005–present

== List of coaches ==
=== Management since 1950 ===
Managers of the club since 1950:

Name	Period	Honours
(El Salvador) Pablo Martinez “La Perla Negra”		
(El Salvador) Esteban Melara		
(Argentina) Marcelo Javier Zuleta		
(El Salvador) José Ramón Avilés		
(El Salvador) Mario Rene Chacon	1984-1985	
(El Salvador) Henry Arias	1989-1990	Segunda División Salvadorean (1) 1991
(El Salvador) Armando Hernandez	1991	
(El Salvador) Saúl Molina	1991-1992	
(El Salvador) Ricardo Guardado	1993	
(Honduras) Mario Ramón Sandoval Plummer	April 1993 - May 1993	
(El Salvador) Omar Sevilla	2004	
(Brazil) (El Salvador) Eraldo Correia	2005	
(Honduras) Tomas Good Lopez	August 2006 -2006	
(Honduras) (El Salvador) Efraín Núñez	2006	
(El Salvador) Mauricio Alvarenga	2007	
(Uruguay) (El Salvador) Rubén Alonso	2008	
(El Salvador) Henry Arias	2009	
(El Salvador) Manuel Ramos	2009-2010	
(El Salvador) Jorge Garay	2013	
(El Salvador) Marvin Hernandez	2014–September 2015	
(Peru) Yahir Camero	September 2015–December 2015	
(El Salvador) Sergio Munoz	January 2016 – July 2016	
(Peru) Yahir Camero	August 2016 – September 2016	
(El Salvador) Luis Dagoberto Sosa	September 2016 – October 2016	
(El Salvador) Omar Sevilla	October 2016 – December 2016	
(Colombia) Luis Carlos Asprilla	December 2016	
(El Salvador) Marvin Javier Hernández	2017 - June 2019	
(El Salvador) Nelson Alvarenga	July 2019 - October 2019	
(El Salvador) Luis Dagoberto Sosa	October 2019 - March 2020	
Hiatus	April 2020 - July 2020	
(El Salvador) Omar Sevilla	August 2020 - June 2021	
(El Salvador) Marvin Garcia	June 2021 - September 2021	
(El Salvador) Luis Ramírez Zapata	September 2021 - December 2021	
(Uruguay) Pablo Quiñones	December 2021 – November 2023	1 Segunda División Salvadorean (2022 Apertura); 1 Segunda División Play-off winners (2022-23)
(El Salvador) Jesus Alvarez (Interim)	November 2023 - December 2023	
(Argentina) Fabio Gaston Larramendi	January 2024 - February 2024	
(El Salvador) Nelson Ancheta	February 2024 - May 2024	
(Mexico) Jorge Martinez Merino	May 2024 - October 2024	
(Uruguay) Ruben Alonso	October 2024 - April 2025	
(El Salvador) Rolando Torres (Interim)	April 2025 - May 2025	
(Argentina) Daniel Corti	May 2025 - September 2025	
(El Salvador) Rolando Torres	September 2025 - March 2026	
(El Salvador) Omar Sevilla	March 2026 - September 2026	
(Uruguay) Pablo Quiñones	September 2026 - Present	

=== Notable managers ===
The following managers have won at least one trophy while in charge at Fuerte San Francisco:

Name	Nationality	From	To	Honours
Henry Arias	El Salvador	1 December 1989	28 May 1991	1 Segunda División Salvadorean (1991)
Pablo Quinonez	Uruguay	1 December 2021	28 November 2023	1 Segunda División Salvadorean (2022 Apertura]); 1 Segunda División Play-off winners (2022-23)

== Other departments ==
=== Football ===
==== Reserve team ====
The reserve team serves mainly as the final stepping stone for promising young players under the age of 21 before being promoted to the main team. The second team is coached by Rolando Torres. the team played in the Primera División Reserves, The team greatest success was finishing TBD in the Apertura 2024.

As of: March, 2025 Note: Flags indicate national team as defined under FIFA eligibility rules; some limited exceptions apply. Players may hold more than one non-FIFA nationality.

No.	Pos.	Nation	Player
31	GK	SLV	Jonathon Garcia
32		SLV	Cristian Perez
33		SLV	Henry Gomez
34		SLV	Deris Lopez
35		SLV	Julio Garcia
36		SLV	Alister Sanchez
38		SLV	Jairo Martinez
40		SLV	Elder Figueroa
42		SLV	Alejandro Guevara
43		SLV	Jostin Cabrera

No.	Pos.	Nation	Player
44		SLV	Carlos Amaya
47		SLV	Saul Ramos
48		SLV	Nicolas Vasquez
49		SLV	Brayan Amaya
50		SLV	Jefry Benitez
53		SLV	Junior Alvarez
54		SLV	Carlos Diaz
57		SLV	Jose Herrera
70		SLV	Juan Arriaza
74		SLV	Cristopher Argueta

Name	Nat	Tenure	Honours
Manuel Acevedo	(El Salvador)	July 2024 - December 2024	
Angel Orellana	(El Salvador)	January 2025 - March 2025	
Rolando Torres	(El Salvador)	March 2025 - April 2025	
Ruben Alonso	(Uruguay)	April 2025 - May 2025	
Rolando Torres	(El Salvador)	May 2025 - Present	

==== Junior teams ====
The youth team (under 17 and under 15) has produced some of El Salvador's top football players, including TBD and TBD. They are currently being coached by Salvadoran Walter Morales.

==== Women's team ====
The women's first team, which is led by head coach Kevin Martinez, features several members of the El Salvador national ladies team. Their greatest successes were reaching the semi-finals the in Apertura .

As of: March, 2025 Note: Flags indicate national team as defined under FIFA eligibility rules; some limited exceptions apply. Players may hold more than one non-FIFA nationality.

No.	Pos.	Nation	Player
1		SLV	Mayra Rodriguez
2		SLV	Glenda Fuertes
3		SLV	Tatiana Miranda
4		SLV	Dinora Pereira
5		SLV	Blanca Vasquez
6		SLV	Jesica Carmen
7		SLV	Santos Maradiaga
8		SLV	Erlinda Fuertes
9		SLV	Angela Hernandez
10		SLV	Alison Diaz
12		SLV	Wendy Cabrera
14		SLV	Flor Joya
15		SLV	Yaqueline Cabrera

No.	Pos.	Nation	Player
17		SLV	Daniela Quiteros
19	GK	SLV	Celina Posada
20		SLV	Ana Escobar
21		SLV	Darlyn Amaya
22		SLV	Laura Argueta
23		SLV	Evelyn Argueta
24		SLV	Jarquline Melgar
25		SLV	Yohana Sanchez
26		SLV	Kelly Diaz

=== In ===
Note: Flags indicate national team as defined under FIFA eligibility rules; some limited exceptions apply. Players may hold more than one non-FIFA nationality.

No.	Pos.	Nation	Player
—	GK	SLV	Paolo Marquez (From Aguila Femenino)
—		SLV	Celina Franco (From Aguila Femenino)
—		SLV	Gabriela Chavez (From Aguila Femenino)
—		SLV	Jennifer Palacios (From Aguila Femenino)
—		SLV	Wendy Lizama (From Aguila Femenino)
—		SLV	Sofia Hernandez (From Aguila Femenino)
—		SLV	Michelle Gonzalez (From Aguila Femenino)
—		SLV	Yariza Argueta (From Limeno Femenino)
—		SLV	Gabriela Amaya (From Limeno Femenino)

No.	Pos.	Nation	Player
—		SLV	TBD (From TBD)
—		SLV	TBD (From TBD)
—		SLV	TBD (From TBD)
—		SLV	TBD (From TBD)
—		SLV	TBD (From TBD)

=== Out ===
Note: Flags indicate national team as defined under FIFA eligibility rules; some limited exceptions apply. Players may hold more than one non-FIFA nationality.

No.	Pos.	Nation	Player
—		SLV	Celina Franco (To Aguila Femenino)
—		SLV	Mayra Hernandez (To Aguila Femenino)
—		SLV	TBD (To TBD)

No.	Pos.	Nation	Player
—		SLV	TBD (To TBD)
—		SLV	TBD (To TBD)
—		SLV	TBD (To TBD)

Name	Nat	Tenure	Honours
Nathan Rivera	(El Salvador)	TBD - December 2024	
Kevin Martinez	(El Salvador)	January 2025 - December 2025	
Brian Zamora	(El Salvador)	December 2025 - June 2026	
Walter Morales	(El Salvador)	June 2026 - Present	
