= C.D. Atlético Comalapa =

Association football club in El Salvador

Atlético Comalapa
- Full name: Club Deportivo Atlético Comalapa
- Founded: 1979
- Ground: Estadio Municipal de Comalapa; Chalatenango, El Salvador
- Chairman: (El Salvador) Walter Léon Guerra
- Manager: (El Salvador) Oscar Ayala
- League: Tercera División Salvadoreño

Club Deportivo Atlético Comalapa is a Salvadoran professional football club based in Chalatenango, El Salvador.

== History ==
On 27 June 2024 Atletico Comalapa announced they would leaving the tercera division due to the increase cost of running a team in the professional division. A year later, It was announced that the club will be returning to play in ADFA Chalatenango.

== Honours ==
=== Domestic honours ===
==== Leagues ====
- Tercera División Salvadorean and predecessors
  - Champions (2) : 2012 Apertura, 2014 Clausura
  - Play-off winner (2):
- La Asociación Departamental de Fútbol Aficionado' and predecessors (4th tier)
  - Champions (1): ADFA Chalatenango 2021
  - Play-off winner (2):

== Current squad ==
As of: Note: Flags indicate national team as defined under FIFA eligibility rules; some limited exceptions apply. Players may hold more than one non-FIFA nationality.

No. / Pos. / Nation / Player; — / / SLV	No. / Pos. / Nation / Player; — / / SLV

== List of coaches ==
In its history, Comalapa have had 9 managers. The first was the Salvadoran Ricardo Serrano. Serrano was the first Comalapa manager to achieve an honour when, in 2012, the club won the Tercera División. Serrano has the honour of being the club's longest-serving manager having spent two years with the club from 2012 to 2014. Serrano is followed by Uruguayan Pablo Quiñonez who spent one season with the club between 2015 and 2016.

Dates	Name
2012 – August 2014	(El Salvador) Ricardo Serrano
August 2014 – December 2014	(El Salvador) Miguel Ángel Soriano
January 2015 – May 2015	(Honduras) German Perez
June 2015 – November 2015	(El Salvador) Mauricio Alfaro
November 2015 – November 2016	(Uruguay) Pablo Quiñones
December 2016 – November 2017	(El Salvador) Jorge Abrego
December 2017 – June 2018	(Honduras) German Pérez
July 2018 – Present	(El Salvador) TBD
July 2019 – 2019	(El Salvador) Jorge Leon
2023	(El Salvador) TBD
2023– January 2024	(El Salvador) Jorge Luis Leon
January 2024 – June 2024	(El Salvador) Oscar Ayala
June 2024	(El Salvador) Jorge Luis Leon
June 2024– May 2025	Hiatus
June 2025– Present	(El Salvador) Jorge Luis Leon
