= Miguel Aguilar (Salvadoran footballer) =

Salvadoran football coach (born 1953)

Personal information
- Full name: Miguel Angel Aguilar Obando
- Date of birth: 21 January 1953 (age 73)
- Place of birth: Usulután, El Salvador

Youth career
- 1969–1971: Luis Ángel Firpo (B)

Senior career*
Years	Team	Apps	(Gls)
1972–1982	Luis Ángel Firpo		

Managerial career
- 1985: Carrera Fútbol Club
- 1986: Atlético Alcancía
- 1991: Mar y Plata
- 1992–1994: Luis Ángel Firpo (reserves)
- 1995: Dragón
- 1996: Santiagueño
- 1996: San Antonio Silva
- 1997–1999: El Salvador (under-17)
- 2000: Aspirante
- 2001: Dragón
- 2002–2005: El Salvador (assistant)
- 2005–2006: El Salvador
- 2008: Luis Ángel Firpo
- 2008–2009: Liberal de Quelapa
- 2009: Municipal Limeño
- 2010–2011: Topiltzín
- 2012–2014: Luis Ángel Firpo (assistant / reserves)
- 2015: Toros FC
- 2016–2017: Platense
- 2017–2018: UDET
- 2018: Águila
- 2018–2019: UDET
- 2020: CD El Vencedor (assistant)
- * Club domestic league appearances and goals

Miguel Angel Aguilar Obando (born 21 January 1953 in Usulután), sometimes known as "La Peluda" , is a Salvadoran football coach.

== Managerial statistics ==
Team	Nat	From	To	Record				
Team	Nat	From	To	G	W	D	L	%
TBD	El Salvador	TBD	TBD	0	0	0	0	%
TBD	El Salvador	TBD	TBD	0	0	0	0	%
Águila	El Salvador	March 2018	June 2018	18	0	0	0	%
TBD	El Salvador	TBD	TBD	0	0	0	0	%
