= Eraldo Correia =

Brazilian footballer and manager (born 1956)

Personal information
- Full name: Eraldo Correial Ribeiro
- Date of birth: January 19, 1956 (age 70)
- Place of birth: Timbaúba, Brazil

Senior career*
Years	Team	Apps	(Gls)
1976	Sport Recife		
1977	Olaria		
1982–1983	FAS		
1983–1984	Tipografía Nacional		
1985	Luis Ángel Firpo		
1985-86	Sonsonate FC		
1987–1990	Acajutla		
1992–1993	ADET		
1978–1980	Santiagueño		
1991–1992	Cojutepeque		
1994–1995	Dragón		

Managerial career
- 1999–2003: Aspirante
- 2005: Fuerte San Francisco
- 2006: Liberal
- 2006–2007: Once Lobos
- 2007: Águila (reserves)
- 2009: Águila
- 2010: Municipal Limeño
- 2010: Águila
- 2011: UES
- 2011–2012: Águila
- 2013: Guadalupano
- 2015–2016: Águila
- 2016: La Asunción
- 2017: Sonsonate FC
- 2017–2018: Luis Ángel Firpo
- 2018: Platense
- 2018–2019: Pasaquina
- 2019–2020: Cacahuatique
- 2021: Santiagueño
- 2022: Luis Ángel Firpo
- 2022: Gerardo Barrios
- 2023: Santiagueño
- * Club domestic league appearances and goals

Eraldo Correia Ribeiro (born January 19, 1956), is a Brazilian former professional football player and current manager.

== Coaching career ==
After retiring as a footballer, Correia undertook a new career as a coach, starting in teams such as Aspirante, Fuerte San Francisco and Liberal. During that time he formed his ideas that later led him to train teams of the Salvadoran Primera División.

=== Once Lobos ===
In 2006, he signed as coach of Once Lobos.

=== Águila reserves ===
In 2007, he took the charge of the reserve team of Águila.

=== Águila ===
But after the departure of Pablo Centrone in April 2009, Correia went on to train the first team until November, in what was his first stage in the team. Later, Correia was replaced by Nelson Mauricio Ancheta.

=== UES ===
Correia signed as coach of UES for the rest of the Clausura 2011 in March 2011, replacing Edgar Henríquez. The scarlet team finished eighth in that tournament.

=== Return to Águila ===
In June 2015, Correia was confirmed as new coach of Águila again, replacing Julio Dely Valdés. Later Correia was replaced by Juan Ramón Sánchez.

=== Sonsonate ===
In 2017, Correia was confirmed as new coach of Sonsonate for the rest of the Clausura 2017 tournament.

=== Luis Ángel Firpo ===
Also in 2017, and after finishing his contractual relationship with Sonsonate, he was confirmed as new manager of Luis Ángel Firpo for the Clausura 2018. However, with the team of Usulután, Correia faced an administrative, economic and sports crisis. Suffering arrears in salary payments and pressures from club directives.

=== Pasaquina ===
Correia signed as new coach of Pasaquina for the Apertura 2018. With the team of La Unión, Correia suffered arrears in salary payments.

== Honours ==
=== As a player ===
Santiagueno

- Primera División de Fútbol de El Salvador: 1979–80

=== As a coach ===
Aguila

- Primera División de Fútbol de El Salvador runner-up: Apertura 2009
