= 2012–13 Segunda División de Fútbol Salvadoreño =

Segunda División de Fútbol Salvadoreño
- Season: 2012–13
- Champions: Ciclon de Golfo (Apertura 2012) & C.D. Dragon (Clasura 2013)
- Relegated: Arcense, Espíritu Santo

The 2012–13 season (officially known as Liga de Plata) was El Salvador's Segunda División de Fútbol Salvadoreño The season was split into two championships Apertura 2012 and Clausura 2013. The champions of the Apertura and Clausura play the direct promotion playoff every year. The winner of that series ascends to Primera División de Fútbol de El Salvador.

The Apertura 2012 was named the Torneo Luis Baltazar Ramírez, after the 1982 world cup player Luis Ramírez Zapata.

== Promotion and relegation 2012–2013 season ==
Teams promoted to Primera División de Fútbol Profesional - Apertura 2012

- Santa Tecla

Teams relegated to Segunda División de Fútbol Salvadoreño - Apertura 2012

- Vista Hermosa

Teams relegated to Tercera División de Fútbol Profesional - Apertura 2012

- Topiltzín

Teams promoted from Tercera Division De Fútbol Profesional - Apertura 2011

- Espíritu Santo
- Turín FESA
- Ciclon de Golfo

Teams that failed to register for the - Apertura 2012

- Fuerte Aguilares
- Municipal Santa Maria

== Team information ==
The league currently consists of the following 20 teams:

Grupo Centro Occidente
| Team | Home city | Stadium |
|---|---|---|
| Arcense | Ciudad Arce, La Libertad Department (El Salvador) | Wismar Stadion |
| Brasilia | Suchitoto, Cuscatlán | Estadio Municipal de Suchitoto |
| Chalatenango | Chalatenango, Chalatenango | Estadio José Gregorio Martínez |
| El Roble | Ilobasco, Cabañas | Estadio Mauricio Vides |
| Isidro Metapán C | Metapán Santa Ana | Estadio Jorge Calero Suárez |
| Marte Soyapango | Soyapango, San Salvador | Estadio Jorgito Melendez |
| Once Lobos | Chalchuapa, Santa Ana | Estadio Cesar Hernández |
| Platense | Zacatecoluca, La Paz | Estadio Antonio Toledo Valle |
| Titán | Texistepeque, Santa Ana | Cancha Sandoval |
| Turín FESA | San Salvador | El Transito |

Grupo Centro Oriente
| Team | Home City | Stadium |
|---|---|---|
| ADI | Intipucá, La Union | Estadio de Intipucá |
| Aspirante | Jucuapa, Usulután | Estadio Municipal de Jucuapa |
| La Asunción | Anamorós | Estadio Jose Eliseo Reyes |
| Ciclon de Golfo | La Unión, El Salvador, La Union | Estadio Marcelino Imbers |
| Dragón | San Miguel, San Miguel | Juan Francisco Barraza |
| Espíritu Santo | Ises el Jobal, Usulután | Espíritu Santos |
| Liberal | Quelepa, San Miguel | Estadio Municipal De Quelapa |
| Municipal Limeño | Santa Rosa de Lima, La Union | Estadio Jose Ramon Flores |
| Pasaquina | Santa Rosa, La Union | Estadio Ramón Flores Berrios |
| C.D. Vista Hermosa | San Francisco Gotera, Morazán Departmenr | Estadio Correcaminos |

== Apertura 2012 ==
Apertura
- Season: Apertura 2012
- Champions: Ciclon de Golfo
- Matches: 180
- Goals: 486 (2.7 per match)
- Top goalscorer: Ricardo Guevara 11 goals, Turín FESA
- Biggest home win: Turín FESA 6-2 Isidro Metapán C (13 October 2012); Once Lobos 6-2 Marte Soyapango (18 November 2012)
- Biggest away win: Vista Hermosa 1-6 ADI (9 August 2012)
- Highest scoring: Turín FESA 6-2 Isidro Metapán C (13 October 2012); Once Lobos 6-2 Marte Soyapango (18 November 2012)

=== Personnel and sponsoring ===
| Team | Manager^{1} | Chairman | Team captain | Kit manufacturer | Sponsor |
|---|---|---|---|---|---|
| ADI x | (El Salvador) | (El Salvador) | (El Salvador) | | |
| Aspirante x | (El Salvador) Martir Paredes x | (El Salvador) | (El Salvador) | | |
| Arcense x | (El Salvador) | (El Salvador) | (El Salvador) | | |
| Brasilia x | (El Salvador) Milton Melendez X | (El Salvador) | (El Salvador) | | |
| Ciclon de Golfo x | (El Salvador) Nelson Mauricio Ancheta x | (El Salvador) | (El Salvador) | | |
| Dragón x | (El Salvador) Jose Mario Martinez x | (El Salvador) | (El Salvador) | | |
| El Roble x | (El Salvador) | (El Salvador) | (El Salvador) | | |
| Espíritu Santo x | (El Salvador) | (El Salvador) | (El Salvador) | | |
| Isidro Metapán C x | (El Salvador) | (El Salvador) | (El Salvador) | | |
| La Asunción x | (El Salvador) | (El Salvador) | (El Salvador) | | |
| Liberal x | (El Salvador) | (El Salvador) | (El Salvador) | | |
| Marte Soyapango x | (El Salvador) | (El Salvador) | (El Salvador) | | |
| Municipal Limeño x | (El Salvador) | (El Salvador) | (El Salvador) | | |
| Once Lobos x | (El Salvador) Cesar Acevedo | (El Salvador) | (El Salvador) | | |
| Pasaquina x | (El Salvador) Esteban Melara X | (El Salvador) | (El Salvador) | | |
| Platense x | (El Salvador) Eduardo Lara Moscote X | (El Salvador) | (El Salvador) | | |
| Titán x | (El Salvador) Antonio Garcia Prieto | (El Salvador) | (El Salvador) | | |
| Turín FESA x | (Argentina) Daniel Fernández X | (El Salvador) | (El Salvador) | | |
| Vendaval | (El Salvador) Marcos Portillo X | (El Salvador) | (El Salvador) | | |
| Vista Hermosa | (El Salvador) | (El Salvador) | (El Salvador) | | |

=== Overall table ===
| Pos | Team | Pld | W | D | L | GF | GA | GD | Pts |
|---|---|---|---|---|---|---|---|---|---|
| 1 | Dragón | 18 | 10 | 5 | 3 | 24 | 14 | +10 | 35 |
| 2 | Once Lobos | 18 | 10 | 4 | 4 | 35 | 23 | +12 | 34 |
| 3 | Turín FESA | 18 | 9 | 3 | 6 | 28 | 17 | +11 | 30 |
| 4 | Pasaquina | 18 | 8 | 6 | 4 | 25 | 16 | +9 | 30 |
| 5 | Ciclon de Golfo | 18 | 7 | 8 | 3 | 26 | 15 | +11 | 29 |
| 6 | Municipal Limeño | 18 | 7 | 8 | 3 | 25 | 19 | +6 | 29 |
| 7 | El Roble | 18 | 8 | 5 | 5 | 25 | 19 | +6 | 29 |
| 8 | ADI | 18 | 7 | 7 | 4 | 25 | 16 | +9 | 28 |
| 9 | Titán | 18 | 7 | 6 | 5 | 29 | 23 | +6 | 27 |
| 10 | Brasilia | 18 | 7 | 6 | 5 | 22 | 24 | −2 | 27 |
| 11 | La Asunción | 18 | 7 | 5 | 6 | 27 | 22 | +5 | 26 |
| 12 | Liberal | 18 | 7 | 3 | 8 | 26 | 24 | +2 | 24 |
| 13 | Platense | 18 | 6 | 5 | 7 | 23 | 26 | −3 | 23 |
| 14 | Aspirante | 18 | 4 | 8 | 6 | 16 | 18 | −2 | 20 |
| 15 | Vendaval | 18 | 4 | 8 | 6 | 22 | 25 | −3 | 20 |
| 16 | Marte Soyapango | 18 | 5 | 5 | 8 | 25 | 31 | −6 | 20 |
| 17 | Isidro Metapán C | 18 | 5 | 3 | 10 | 27 | 42 | −15 | 18 |
| 18 | Arcense | 18 | 3 | 7 | 8 | 18 | 24 | −6 | 16 |
| 19 | Espíritu Santo | 18 | 2 | 5 | 11 | 18 | 40 | −22 | 11 |
| 20 | Vista Hermosa | 18 | 2 | 3 | 13 | 20 | 48 | −28 | 9 |

Updated to match(es) played on October 21, 2012. Source: elgrafico.com
Rules for classification: 1) points; 2) goal difference; 3) number of goals scored.

==== Group standings ====
===== Grupo Centro Occidente =====
| Pos | Team | Pld | W | D | L | GF | GA | GD | Pts | Qualification |
|---|---|---|---|---|---|---|---|---|---|---|
| 1 | Once Lobos | 18 | 10 | 4 | 4 | 35 | 23 | +12 | 34 | Qualification for playoffs |
| 2 | Turín FESA | 18 | 9 | 3 | 6 | 28 | 17 | +11 | 30 | Qualification for playoffs |
| 3 | El Roble | 18 | 8 | 5 | 5 | 25 | 19 | +6 | 29 | Qualification for playoffs |
| 4 | Titán | 18 | 7 | 6 | 5 | 29 | 23 | +6 | 27 | Qualification for playoffs |
| 5 | Brasilia | 18 | 7 | 6 | 5 | 22 | 24 | −2 | 27 | |
| 6 | Platense | 18 | 6 | 5 | 7 | 23 | 26 | −3 | 23 | |
| 7 | Vendaval | 18 | 4 | 8 | 6 | 22 | 25 | −3 | 20 | |
| 8 | Marte Soyapango | 18 | 5 | 5 | 8 | 25 | 31 | −6 | 20 | |
| 9 | Isidro Metapán C | 18 | 5 | 3 | 10 | 27 | 42 | −15 | 18 | |
| 10 | Arcense | 18 | 3 | 7 | 8 | 18 | 24 | −6 | 16 | |

| Home \ Away | ARC | BRA | ROB | MET | SOY | OLB | PLA | TIN | FES | VEN |
|---|---|---|---|---|---|---|---|---|---|---|
| Arcense | | 3–0 | 1–1 | 1–1 | 1–1 | 1–2 | 1–0 | 0–0 | 1–1 | 3–2 |
| Brasilia | 1–1 | | 2–1 | 3–2 | 1–0 | 0–3 | 1–0 | 0–0 | 1–0 | 1–1 |
| El Roble | 1–0 | 1–1 | | 1–0 | 1–0 | 1–1 | 5–0 | 2–1 | 1–0 | 2–0 |
| Isidro Metapán C | 3–1 | 0–4 | 4–3 | | 3–0 | 0–2 | 2–2 | 3–1 | 0–1 | 1–0 |
| Marte Soyapango | 2–1 | 4–2 | 0–1 | 3–1 | | 0–1 | 2–2 | 3–3 | 3–0 | 2–2 |
| Once Lobos | 2–2 | 1–1 | 2–1 | 5–0 | 6–2 | | 1–4 | 3–1 | 0–1 | 2–1 |
| Platense | 1–0 | 0–0 | 2–0 | 3–3 | 2–0 | 0–1 | | 1–0 | 2–1 | 1–1 |
| Titán | 2–0 | 3–1 | 2–2 | 4–1 | 2–0 | 3–2 | 3–2 | | 0–0 | 3–1 |
| Turín FESA | 2–1 | 2–0 | 2–0 | 6–2 | 1–2 | 5–1 | 3–0 | 1–0 | | 1–2 |
| Vendaval | 2–0 | 2–3 | 1–1 | 2–1 | 1–1 | 0–0 | 2–1 | 1–1 | 1–1 | |

Legend: Blue = home team win; Yellow = draw; Red = away team win.

===== Grupo Centro Oriente =====
| Pos | Team | Pld | W | D | L | GF | GA | GD | Pts | Qualification |
|---|---|---|---|---|---|---|---|---|---|---|
| 1 | Dragón | 18 | 10 | 5 | 3 | 24 | 14 | +10 | 35 | Qualification for playoffs |
| 2 | Pasaquina | 18 | 8 | 6 | 4 | 25 | 16 | +9 | 30 | Qualification for playoffs |
| 3 | Ciclon de Golfo | 18 | 7 | 8 | 3 | 26 | 15 | +11 | 29 | Qualification for playoffs |
| 4 | Municipal Limeño | 18 | 7 | 8 | 3 | 25 | 19 | +6 | 29 | Qualification for playoffs |
| 5 | ADI | 18 | 7 | 7 | 4 | 25 | 16 | +9 | 28 | |
| 6 | La Asunción | 18 | 7 | 5 | 6 | 27 | 22 | +5 | 26 | |
| 7 | Liberal | 18 | 7 | 3 | 8 | 26 | 24 | +2 | 24 | |
| 8 | Aspirante | 18 | 4 | 8 | 6 | 16 | 18 | −2 | 20 | |
| 9 | Espíritu Santo | 18 | 2 | 5 | 11 | 18 | 40 | −22 | 11 | |
| 10 | Vista Hermosa | 18 | 2 | 3 | 13 | 20 | 48 | −28 | 9 | |

| Home \ Away | ADI | ASP | CDG | DRA | SAN | ASU | LIB | MLI | PAS | VIS |
|---|---|---|---|---|---|---|---|---|---|---|
| ADI F.C. | | 2–1 | 0–0 | 1–1 | 3–1 | 1–2 | 3–1 | 2–2 | 0–0 | 0–1 |
| Aspirante | 0–0 | | 0–0 | 0–0 | 1–1 | 3–0 | 1–1 | 0–0 | 2–1 | 2–0 |
| Ciclon de Golfo | 1–0 | 2–1 | | 0–1 | 3–0 | 1–1 | 0–0 | 2–0 | 1–3 | 4–0 |
| Dragón | 0–0 | 2–0 | 3–2 | | 4–1 | 1–2 | 2–1 | 1–1 | 1–1 | 2–0 |
| Espíritu Santo | 0–1 | 1–1 | 1–1 | 0–1 | | 0–3 | 2–1 | 1–1 | 1–1 | 2–3 |
| La Asunción | 0–2 | 2–0 | 2–2 | 0–1 | 5–2 | | 0–2 | 1–2 | 0–1 | 4–2 |
| Liberal | 0–1 | 2–0 | 1–2 | 2–0 | 3–0 | 1–1 | | 0–1 | 1–2 | 4–2 |
| Municipal Limeño | 4–2 | 1–0 | 1–1 | 1–0 | 4–3 | 1–2 | 4–1 | | 0–1 | 1–1 |
| Pasaquina | 1–1 | 0–1 | 0–0 | 0–1 | 4–0 | 1–1 | 1–2 | 3–2 | | 4–2 |
| Vista Hermosa | 1–6 | 3–3 | 1–4 | 2–3 | 0–2 | 0–3 | 2–3 | 0–0 | 0–1 | |

Legend: Blue = home team win; Yellow = draw; Red = away team win.

=== Final phase ===
Quarterfinals
1A | Once Lobos | 1 | 2 | 3
4B | Municipal Limeño | 2 | 0 | 2
3A | El Roble | 1 | 0 | 1
2B | Ciclon de Golfo | 0 | 2 | 2
2A | Turín FESA | 0 | 1 | 1
3B | Pasaquina | 0 | 0 | 0
4A | Titán | 2 | 1 | 3
1B | Dragón | 2 | 0 | 2

Semifinals
1A | Once Lobos | 0 | 0 | 0
2B | Ciclon de Golfo | 2 | 1 | 3
2A | Turín FESA | 3 | 1 | 4
4A | Titán | 1 | 1 | 2

Finals
2B | Ciclon de Golfo | 0 | 2 | 2
2A | Turín FESA | 1 | 0 | 1

==== Quarterfinals ====
===== First leg =====
25 November 2012
15:00 UTC-6

| Municipal Limeño | 2–1 | Once Lobos |
|---|---|---|
| Derlyn Romero 18'; Erick Reyes 89' (pen.) | Report | Raul Estrada 26' |

Estadio Jose Ramon Flores, Santa Rosa de Lima

25 November 2012
15:00 UTC-6

| El Roble | 1–0 | Ciclon de Golfo |
|---|---|---|
| Juan Carlos Melgan | Report |

Estadio Mauricio Vides, Ilobasco

24 November 2012
15:00 UTC-6

| Pasaquina | 0–0 | Turín FESA |
|---|---|---|
| | Report |

Estadio San Sebastian, Pasaquina

25 November 2012
15:00 UTC-6

| Titán | 2–2 | Dragón |
|---|---|---|
| Erick Orellana 46', 59' | Report | Rommel Mejía 25'; Ortíz 50' |

Estadio Sandoval, Texistepeque

===== Second leg =====
2 December 2012
15:00 UTC-6

| Once Lobos | 2–0 | Municipal Limeño |
|---|---|---|
| Jesús Albeño 20'; David Rugamas 45+2' |

Estadio Cesar Hernández, Chalchuapa

2 December 2012
15:00 UTC-6

| Ciclon de Golfo | 2–0 | El Roble |
|---|---|---|
| Jhony Guzmán 45+4' (pen.); Alexis Hernández 48' |

Estadio Marcelino Imbers, La Unión

1 December 2012
15:00 UTC-6

| Turín FESA | 1–0 | Pasaquina |
|---|---|---|
| Erick Padilla 53' |

Estadio Santa Clara, San Luis Talpa

2 December 2012
15:00 UTC-6

| Dragón | 0–1 | Titán |
|---|---|---|
| | | Mario Posadas 87' |

Estadio Juan Francisco Barraza, San Miguel

==== Semi-finals ====
===== First leg =====
9 December 2012
15:00 UTC-6

| Ciclon de Golfo | 2–0 | Once Lobos |
|---|---|---|
| Alexis Hernández 82'; Emerson Linares 90' |

Estadio Marcelino Imbers, La Unión

9 December 2012
15:00 UTC-6

| Titán | 1–3 | Turín FESA |
|---|---|---|
| Daniel Duarte 45+2' | | Ricardo Guevara 40', 51'; Erick Padilla 67' |

Estadio Sandoval, Texistepeque

===== Second leg =====
16 December 2012
15:00 UTC-6

| Once Lobos | 0–1 | Ciclon de Golfo |
|---|---|---|
| | | Jorge Umanzor |

Estadio Cesar Hernández, Chalchuapa

16 December 2012
15:00 UTC-6

| Turín FESA | 1–1 | Titán |
|---|---|---|
| Ricardo Guevara 80' | | Olvin Duarte 32' |

Estadio Santa Clara, San Luis Talpa

==== Finals ====
===== First leg =====
27 December 2012
15:00 UTC-6

| Turín FESA | 1-0 | Ciclon de Golfo |
|---|---|---|
| Jairo Henríquez 49' | | None |

Estadio Santa Clara, San Luis Talpa

===== Second leg =====
30 December 2012
15:00 UTC-6

| Ciclon de Golfo | 2-0 | Turín FESA |
|---|---|---|
| Yimmy Baloyes 6'; Franklin Vinosis Webster 79' | | None |

Estadio Marcelino Imbers, La Unión

Apertura 2012 champions
Ciclon de Golfo
1st title

=== Individual awards ===
| Hombre GOL | Best Goalkeeper Award |
|---|---|
| (El Salvador) TBD; TBD | (El Salvador) TBD; TBD |

== Clausura 2013 ==
Clausura
- Season: Clausura 2013

=== Personnel and sponsoring ===
| Team | Manager^{1} | Chairman | Team captain | Kit manufacturer | Sponsor |
|---|---|---|---|---|---|
| ADI x | (El Salvador) Salomón Quintanilla X | (El Salvador) | (El Salvador) | | |
| Aspirante x | (El Salvador) | (El Salvador) | (El Salvador) | | |
| Arcense x | (El Salvador) | (El Salvador) | (El Salvador) | | |
| Brasilia x | (El Salvador) Milton Melendez X | (El Salvador) | (El Salvador) | | |
| Ciclon de Golfo x | (El Salvador) Nelson Mauricio Ancheta x | (El Salvador) | (El Salvador) | | |
| Dragón x | (El Salvador) José Mario Martínez x | (El Salvador) | (El Salvador) | | |
| El Roble x | (El Salvador) Carlos Meléndez | (El Salvador) | (El Salvador) | | |
| Espíritu Santo x | (El Salvador) | (El Salvador) | (El Salvador) | | |
| Isidro Metapán C x | (El Salvador) | (El Salvador) | (El Salvador) | | |
| La Asunción x | (El Salvador) | (El Salvador) | (El Salvador) | | |
| Liberal x | (El Salvador) | (El Salvador) | (El Salvador) | | |
| Marte Soyapango x | (Chile) Raúl Toro | (El Salvador) | (El Salvador) | | |
| Municipal Limeño x | (El Salvador) | (El Salvador) | (El Salvador) | | |
| Once Lobos x | (El Salvador) Cesar Acevedo | (El Salvador) | (El Salvador) | | |
| Pasaquina x | (El Salvador) | (El Salvador) | (El Salvador) | | |
| Platense x | (El Salvador) Eduardo Lara Moscote X | (El Salvador) | (El Salvador) | | |
| Titán x | (El Salvador) Antonio Garcia Prieto | (El Salvador) | (El Salvador) | | |
| Turín FESA x | (Argentina) Daniel Fernández X | (El Salvador) | (El Salvador) | | |
| Vendaval | (El Salvador) Jorge Calles X | (El Salvador) | (El Salvador) | | |
| Vista Hermosa | (El Salvador) | (El Salvador) | (El Salvador) | | |

=== Overall table ===
| Pos | Team | Pld | W | D | L | GF | GA | GD | Pts |
|---|---|---|---|---|---|---|---|---|---|
| 1 | Ciclon de Golfo | 18 | 12 | 3 | 3 | 31 | 16 | +15 | 39 |
| 2 | Turín FESA | 18 | 10 | 6 | 2 | 35 | 12 | +23 | 36 |
| 3 | Dragón | 18 | 9 | 4 | 5 | 29 | 18 | +11 | 31 |
| 4 | Aspirante | 18 | 9 | 3 | 6 | 33 | 20 | +13 | 30 |
| 5 | Vendaval | 18 | 7 | 7 | 4 | 18 | 13 | +5 | 28 |
| 6 | Municipal Limeño | 18 | 6 | 9 | 3 | 26 | 19 | +7 | 27 |
| 7 | ADI | 18 | 8 | 3 | 7 | 23 | 20 | +3 | 27 |
| 8 | Brasilia | 18 | 6 | 8 | 4 | 20 | 19 | +1 | 26 |
| 9 | Once Lobos | 18 | 6 | 6 | 6 | 18 | 21 | −3 | 24 |
| 10 | La Asunción | 18 | 5 | 8 | 5 | 26 | 23 | +3 | 23 |
| 11 | Titán | 18 | 6 | 5 | 7 | 24 | 24 | 0 | 23 |
| 12 | Platense | 18 | 6 | 3 | 9 | 25 | 25 | 0 | 21 |
| 13 | El Roble | 18 | 6 | 3 | 9 | 18 | 24 | −6 | 21 |
| 14 | Marte Soyapango | 18 | 3 | 11 | 4 | 24 | 24 | 0 | 20 |
| 15 | Isidro Metapán C | 18 | 4 | 8 | 6 | 33 | 36 | −3 | 20 |
| 16 | Vista Hermosa | 18 | 5 | 5 | 8 | 18 | 27 | −9 | 20 |
| 17 | Arcense | 18 | 5 | 5 | 8 | 18 | 35 | −17 | 20 |
| 18 | Pasaquina | 18 | 3 | 9 | 6 | 26 | 31 | −5 | 18 |
| 19 | Liberal | 18 | 2 | 7 | 9 | 21 | 38 | −17 | 13 |
| 20 | Espíritu Santo | 18 | 2 | 7 | 9 | 20 | 41 | −21 | 13 |

Rules for classification: 1) points; 2) goal difference; 3) number of goals scored.

==== Group standings ====
===== Grupo Centro Occidente =====
| Pos | Team | Pld | W | D | L | GF | GA | GD | Pts | Qualification |
|---|---|---|---|---|---|---|---|---|---|---|
| 1 | Turín FESA | 18 | 10 | 6 | 2 | 35 | 12 | +23 | 36 | Qualification for playoffs |
| 2 | Vendaval | 18 | 7 | 7 | 4 | 18 | 13 | +5 | 28 | Qualification for playoffs |
| 3 | Brasilia | 18 | 6 | 8 | 4 | 20 | 19 | +1 | 26 | Qualification for playoffs |
| 4 | Once Lobos | 18 | 6 | 6 | 6 | 18 | 21 | −3 | 24 | Qualification for playoffs |
| 5 | Titán | 18 | 6 | 5 | 7 | 24 | 24 | 0 | 23 | |
| 6 | Platense | 18 | 6 | 3 | 9 | 25 | 25 | 0 | 21 | |
| 7 | El Roble | 18 | 6 | 3 | 9 | 18 | 24 | −6 | 21 | |
| 8 | Marte Soyapango | 18 | 3 | 11 | 4 | 24 | 24 | 0 | 20 | |
| 9 | Isidro Metapán C | 18 | 4 | 8 | 6 | 33 | 36 | −3 | 20 | |
| 10 | Arcense | 18 | 5 | 5 | 8 | 18 | 35 | −17 | 20 | |

| Home \ Away | ARC | BRA | ROB | MET | SOY | OLB | PLA | TIN | FES | VEN |
|---|---|---|---|---|---|---|---|---|---|---|
| Arcense | | | | | | | | | | |
| Brasilia | | | | | | | | | | |
| El Roble | | | | | | | | | | |
| Isidro Metapán C | | | | | | | | | | |
| Marte Soyapango | | | | | | | | | | |
| Once Lobos | | | | | | | | | | |
| Platense | | | | | | | | | | |
| Titán | | | | | | | | | | |
| Turín FESA | | | | | | | | | | |
| Vendaval | | | | | | | | | | |

Legend: Blue = home team win; Yellow = draw; Red = away team win.

===== Grupo Centro Oriente =====
| Pos | Team | Pld | W | D | L | GF | GA | GD | Pts | Qualification |
|---|---|---|---|---|---|---|---|---|---|---|
| 1 | Ciclon de Golfo | 18 | 12 | 3 | 3 | 31 | 16 | +15 | 39 | Qualification for playoffs |
| 2 | Dragón | 18 | 9 | 4 | 5 | 29 | 18 | +11 | 31 | Qualification for playoffs |
| 3 | Aspirante | 18 | 9 | 3 | 6 | 33 | 20 | +13 | 30 | Qualification for playoffs |
| 4 | Municipal Limeño | 18 | 6 | 9 | 3 | 26 | 19 | +7 | 27 | Qualification for playoffs |
| 5 | ADI | 18 | 8 | 3 | 7 | 23 | 20 | +3 | 27 | |
| 6 | La Asunción | 18 | 5 | 8 | 5 | 26 | 23 | +3 | 23 | |
| 7 | Vista Hermosa | 18 | 5 | 5 | 8 | 18 | 27 | −9 | 20 | |
| 8 | Pasaquina | 18 | 3 | 9 | 6 | 26 | 31 | −5 | 18 | |
| 9 | Liberal | 18 | 2 | 7 | 9 | 21 | 38 | −17 | 13 | |
| 10 | Espíritu Santo | 18 | 2 | 7 | 9 | 20 | 41 | −21 | 13 | |

| Home \ Away | ADI | ASP | CDG | DRA | SAN | ASU | LIB | MLI | PAS | VIS |
|---|---|---|---|---|---|---|---|---|---|---|
| ADI F.C. | | | | | | | | | | |
| Aspirante | | | | | | | | | | |
| Ciclon de Golfo | | | | | | | | | | |
| Dragón | | | | | | | | | | |
| Espíritu Santo | | | | | | | | | | |
| La Asunción | | | | | | | | | | |
| Liberal | | | | | | | | | | |
| Municipal Limeño | | | | | | | | | | |
| Pasaquina | | | | | | | | | | |
| Vista Hermosa | | | | | | | | | | |

Legend: Blue = home team win; Yellow = draw; Red = away team win.

=== Final phase ===
Quarterfinals
1A | Municipal Limeño | 3 | 3 | 6
4B | Turín FESA | 2 | 4 | 6 (pen 4-1)
3A | Aspirante | 1 | 1 | 2
2B | C.D. Vendaval | 1 | 1 | 2 (pen 5-3)
2A | C.D. Brasilia | 1 | 0 | 1
3B | Dragón | 1 | 1 | 2 (after extra time)
4A | Ciclon de Golfo | 0 | 2 | 2
1B | Once Lobos | 0 | 0 | 0

Semifinals
1A | Turín FESA | 0 | 2 | 2
2B | Dragón | 1 | 3 | 4
2A | Ciclon de Golfo | 1 | 4 | 5
4A | C.D. Vendaval | 1 | 1 | 2

Finals
2B | C.D. Dragon | 3 | 0 | 3
2A | Ciclon de Golfo | 1 | 1 | 2

Clausura 2013 champions
C.D. Dragon
3rd title

=== Individual awards ===
| Hombre GOL | Best Goalkeeper Award |
|---|---|
| (El Salvador) Marvin Fuentes; C.D. Municipal Limeno | (El Salvador) Rodrigo Argueta; Turin FESA |
