= 2016–17 Copa El Salvador =

2016–2017 Copa El Salvador
Tournament details
- Country: El Salvador
- Teams: 36

Tournament statistics
- Matches played: 72
- Goals scored: 259 (3.6 per match)

The Copa El Salvador 2016–17 is the fifth staging of the Copa El Salvador football tournament and the first was played since the 2014–15 edition when the tournament was known as the Copa Presidente.

This tournament started on 16 October 2016.

== Participants ==
This tournament will feature all the clubs from the Salvadoran Primera División, 12 from the Segunda División, and 12 from the Tercera División.

== Group stage ==
Each group was composed of three clubs: one from Primera División, one from Segunda División and one from the Tercera División. The clubs played a double round-robin for a total of four games each. The 12 group winners and top 4 group runners-up advanced to the knockout stage.

=== Group A ===
Pos	Team	Pld	W	D	L	GF	GA	GD	Pts	Qualification
1	Isidro Metapán	4	4	0	0	14	2	+12	12	Advance to knockout stage
2	Espartano	4	1	1	2	5	8	−3	4	
3	Leones de Occidente	4	0	1	3	2	11	−9	1	

Rules for classification: Tiebreakers

19 October 2016	Espartano	0–2	Isidro Metapán	Polideportivo Helene Arias, San Julián
			Cristian Medina 35'; José Peña 76'

26 October 2016	Leones de Occidente	1–3	Isidro Metapán	Estadio Jorge Calero Suárez
	Carlos Alarcón 5'		Ricardo Brown 18'; César Monterrosa 44'; Vladimír Ochoa 77'

November 2016	Espartano	3–0	Leones de Occidente	Polideportivo Helene Arias, San Julián
	Carlos Ramos 43' 52'; Carlos Soto 63'

21 February 2017	Leones de Occidente	1–1	Espartano	Estadio Jorge Calero Suárez

15 March 2017	Isidro Metapán	4–0	Leones de Occidente	Estadio Jorge Calero Suárez

29 March 2017	Isidro Metapán	5–1	Espartano	Estadio Jorge Calero Suárez

=== Group B ===
Pos	Team	Pld	W	D	L	GF	GA	GD	Pts	Qualification
1	FAS	4	2	2	0	9	2	+7	8	Advance to knockout stage
2	Once Municipal	4	2	2	0	6	1	+5	8	Advance to knockout stage
3	ADET	4	0	0	4	1	13	−12	0	

Rules for classification: Tiebreakers

19 October 2016	ADET	0–1	Once Municipal	Cancha Hacienda El Tránsito, La Libertad
			Ricardo Figueroa 66'

26 October 2016	Once Municipal	0–0	FAS	Estadio Simeón Magaña

16 November 2016	ADET	1–3	FAS	Cancha Hacienda El Tránsito, La Libertad
	Raymundo Cortéz 35'		Josué Rivera 57'; Ricardo Guevara 62'; Ronald Padilla 74'

22 February 2017	Once Municipal	4–0	ADET	Estadio Simeón Magaña
	Jairo Rebollo; Rubén Álvarez; Tomás Soria; José Escobar

15 March 2017	FAS	1–1	Once Municipal	Estadio Óscar Quiteño
	Allan Murialdo 23'		Miguel Solís 52'

29 March 2017	FAS	5–0	ADET	Estadio Óscar Quiteño
	Allan Murialdo; C. García; Fernando Castillo

=== Group C ===
Pos	Team	Pld	W	D	L	GF	GA	GD	Pts	Qualification
1	Juventud Cara Sucia	4	2	0	2	4	7	−3	6	Advance to knockout stage
2	Once Lobos	4	1	2	1	5	2	+3	5	
3	Sonsonate	4	1	2	1	2	2	0	5	

Rules for classification: Tiebreakers

19 October 2016	Juventud Cara Sucia	1–2	Sonsonate	Cancha Puente Arce, San Francisco Menéndez
	Héctor Ayala 44'		Rafael Burgos 48'; Óscar Escalante 70'

26 October 2016	Once Lobos	0–0	Sonsonate	Estadio Once Lobos

November 2016	Juventud Cara Sucia	2–1	Once Lobos	Cancha Puente Arce, San Francisco Menéndez

22 February 2017	Once Lobos	4–0	Juventud Cara Sucia	Estadio Once Lobos

15 March 2017	Sonsonate	0–0	Once Lobos	Estadio Anna Mercedes Campos

29 March 2017	Sonsonate	0–1	Juventud Cara Sucia	Estadio Anna Mercedes Campos

=== Group D ===
Pos	Team	Pld	W	D	L	GF	GA	GD	Pts	Qualification
1	Universidad de El Salvador	4	3	0	1	8	5	+3	9	Advance to knockout stage
2	Atlético Comalapa	4	2	0	2	8	8	0	6	
3	Municipal Ilopaneco	4	1	0	3	4	7	−3	3	

Rules for classification: Tiebreakers

19 October 2016	Municipal Ilopaneco	1–2	Atlético Comalapa	Cancha Azteca, Ilopango
	Jorge Rivas 38'		Miguel Guardado 42'; José Girón 61'

26 October 2016	Atlético Comalapa	2–3	Universidad de El Salvador	Estadio Municipal de Comalapa
	Milton Velásquez 33'; William Castillo 69'		Harold Alas 42'; Rodrigo Martínez 62'; Adalberto Hernández 77'

November 2016	Municipal Ilopaneco	2–1	Universidad de El Salvador	Cancha Azteca, Ilopango
	Fernando Amaya 34'; Jorge Linares 88'		Kevin Calderón 65'

22 February 2017	Atlético Comalapa	3–1	Municipal Ilopaneco	Estadio Municipal de Comalapa

15 March 2017	Universidad de El Salvador	3–1	Atlético Comalapa	Estadio Universitario UES
	José Villavicencio 24'; Cristian Gil Mosquera 52' 64'

29 March 2017	Universidad de El Salvador	1–0	Municipal Ilopaneco	Estadio Universitario UES

=== Group E ===
Pos	Team	Pld	W	D	L	GF	GA	GD	Pts	Qualification
1	Santa Tecla	4	2	1	1	13	6	+7	7	Advance to knockout stage
2	El Roble	4	2	1	1	7	6	+1	7	Advance to knockout stage
3	Escuela de Fútbol de Guazapa	4	1	0	3	8	16	−8	3	

Rules for classification: Tiebreakers

19 October 2016	Escuela de Fútbol de Guazapa	5–3	Santa Tecla	FESA, Teófilo J. Simán, Guazapa
	Juan Urquía 18' 45+1'; Alejandro Flores 52'; Melvin Pineda 64'; Roberto Carranza 66'		William Maldonado 44' 63'; Sergio Souza 83'

26 October 2016	El Roble	0–0	Santa Tecla	Estadio Mauricio Vides

November 2016	Escuela de Fútbol de Guazapa	1–2	El Roble	FESA, Teófilo J. Simán, Guazapa
	Yeison Figueroa 32'		Aquiles Méndez 44'; José Luis Amaya 76'

22 February 2017	El Roble	5–1	Escuela de Fútbol de Guazapa	Estadio Mauricio Vides

15 March 2017	Santa Tecla	4–0	El Roble	Estadio Las Delicias, Santa Tecla
	Juan Barahona 17'; Henry Argueta 41', 76'; Ricardinho 90+1'

22 March 2017	Santa Tecla	6–1	Escuela de Fútbol de Guazapa	Estadio Las Delicias, Santa Tecla

=== Group F ===
Pos	Team	Pld	W	D	L	GF	GA	GD	Pts	Qualification
1	Alianza	4	3	1	0	19	4	+15	10	Advance to knockout stage
2	Audaz	4	2	1	1	6	6	0	7	
3	San Jerónimo Nejapa	4	0	0	4	1	16	−15	0	

Rules for classification: Tiebreakers

19 October 2016	San Jerónimo Nejapa	0–1	Audaz	Polideportivo Vitoria-Gasteiz, Nejapa
			Hayner Caicedo 55'

27 October 2016	Audaz	1–1	Alianza	Estadio La Coyotera
3:30 pm	Cristian Gil Mosquera 5'		Carlos Herrera 80'

November 2016	San Jerónimo Nejapa	1–5	Alianza	Polideportivo Vitoria-Gasteiz, Nejapa
	Andrés Ábrego 31'		Isaac Portillo 25'; Alexander Larín 37'; Carlos Herrera 39'; Christopher Ramírez 45'; J.C. Portillo 83'

22 February 2017	Audaz	2–0	San Jerónimo Nejapa	Estadio La Coyotera
	Farel Domínguez; Leví Domínguez

15 March 2017	Alianza	5–2	Audaz	Estadio Cuscatlán
	Alexander Larín 32'; Luis Hinestroza 41'; José Contreras 62', 72'; Boris Morales 78'

22 March 2017	Alianza	8–0	San Jerónimo Nejapa	Estadio Cuscatlán
	David Díaz; José Contreras; Isaac Portillo; Christopher Ramírez

=== Group G ===
Pos	Team	Pld	W	D	L	GF	GA	GD	Pts	Qualification
1	Sensunte Cabañas	4	2	1	1	11	9	+2	7	Advance to knockout stage
2	Chalatenango	4	2	0	2	7	6	+1	6	
3	Vendaval	4	1	1	2	4	7	−3	4	

Rules for classification: Tiebreakers

19 October 2016	Sensunte Cabañas	0–3	Chalatenango	Polideportivo Sensuntepeque, Cabañas
			Édgar Guardado 7'; Bladimir Díaz 61'; Carlos Zamora 80'

26 October 2016	Chalatenango	1–0	Vendaval	Estadio José Gregorio Martínez
	César Polanco 77' (o.g.)

9 November 2016	Sensunte Cabañas	4–1	Vendaval	Polideportivo Sensuntepeque, Cabañas

24 November 2016	Vendaval	1–0	Chalatenango	Estadio Joaquín Gutiérrez, Apopa

22 February 2017	Vendaval	2–2	Sensunte Cabañas	Estadio Joaquín Gutiérrez, Apopa

29 March 2017	Chalatenango	3–5	Sensunte Cabañas	Estadio José Gregorio Martínez

=== Group H ===
Pos	Team	Pld	W	D	L	GF	GA	GD	Pts	Qualification
1	Águila	4	4	0	0	17	6	+11	12	Advance to knockout stage
2	Luis Ángel Firpo B	4	1	0	3	9	14	−5	3	
3	Los Andes	4	1	0	3	6	12	−6	3	

Source: -
Rules for classification: Tiebreakers

19 October 2016	Los Andes	1–2	Águila	Estadio Los Andes, San Jorge, San Miguel
	Geovani Martínez 83' (pen.)		Nicolás Muñoz 9'; Ronald Torres 65'

26 October 2016	Luis Ángel Firpo B	1–4	Águila	Estadio Sergio Torres
	Kerín Perlera 27'		Élmer Araniva 22' (o.g.); Nelson González 25'; Henry Romero 55'; Ronald Torres 84'

November 2016	Los Andes	3–2	Luis Ángel Firpo B	Estadio Los Andes, San Jorge, San Miguel

22 February 2017	Luis Ángel Firpo B	3–1	Los Andes	Estadio Sergio Torres

15 March 2017	Águila	6–3	Luis Ángel Firpo B	Polideportivo Don Bosco
	Álvaro Lizama 23', 69'; Marvin Ramos 35'; Isidro Gutiérrez 53'; Éver González 78'		Carlos Medrano 30', 44'

29 March 2017	Águila	5–1	Los Andes	Polideportivo Don Bosco

=== Group I ===
Pos	Team	Pld	W	D	L	GF	GA	GD	Pts	Qualification
1	Pasaquina	4	3	0	1	7	7	0	9	Advance to knockout stage
2	Chagüite	4	2	1	1	10	5	+5	7	Advance to knockout stage
3	La Asunción	4	0	1	3	4	9	−5	1	

Source: -
Rules for classification: Tiebreakers

23 November 2016	Chagüite	1–2	Pasaquina	Estadio Correcaminos, Morazan
	Roberto Sol 38'		Juan Miranda 35' (o.g.); Pedro Chávez 91'

26 October 2016	La Asunción	1–2	Pasaquina	Estadio José Eliseo Reyes
	Josielson Moraes 71'		Delber Palacios 14'; Alexander Campos 42'

November 2016	Chagüite	1–1	La Asunción	Estadio Correcaminos, Morazan

22 February 2017	La Asunción	1–4	Chagüite	Estadio José Eliseo Reyes

15 March 2017	Pasaquina	2–1	La Asunción	Estadio San Sebastián
	Érick Villalobos 35'; Javier Lezcano 53'

29 March 2017	Pasaquina	1–4	Chagüite	Estadio San Sebastián

=== Group J ===
Pos	Team	Pld	W	D	L	GF	GA	GD	Pts	Qualification
1	Luis Ángel Firpo	4	3	0	1	12	2	+10	9	Advance to knockout stage
2	Jocoro	4	2	1	1	6	3	+3	7	Advance to knockout stage
3	UDET	4	0	1	3	1	14	−13	1	

Source: -
Rules for classification: Tiebreakers

19 October 2016	UDET	0–4	Luis Ángel Firpo	Estadio Cesar Angulo, El Transito, San Miguel
			Joel Perucci Roberto Carlos Rodriguez; Bryan Landaverde

26 October 2016	Jocoro	1–2	Luis Ángel Firpo	Complejo Deportivo Tierra de Juego
	Kevin Cruz		Edwin Lazo; Fidel Jiménez

November 2016	UDET	1–1	Jocoro	Estadio Cesar Angulo, El Transito, San Miguel
	Goal		Goal

22 February 2017	Jocoro	3–0	UDET	Complejo Deportivo Tierra de Juego
	Goal

15 March 2017	Luis Ángel Firpo	0–1	Jocoro	Estadio Sergio Torres

29 March 2017	Luis Ángel Firpo	6–0	UDET	Estadio Sergio Torres

=== Group K ===
Pos	Team	Pld	W	D	L	GF	GA	GD	Pts	Qualification
1	Municipal Limeño	4	4	0	0	12	5	+7	12	Advance to knockout stage
2	Aspirante	4	2	0	2	7	7	0	6	
3	Real San Esteban	4	0	0	4	4	11	−7	0	

Source: -
Rules for classification: Tiebreakers

19 October 2016	Real San Esteban	0–2	Municipal Limeño	Cancha las Delicias, San Esteban Catarina, San Vicente
	None		Misael Contreras; Ramiro Carballo

26 October 2016	Aspirante	1–2	Municipal Limeño	Estadio Municipal de Jucuapa
	Goal		Ramiro Carballo; Christopher Galeas

November 2016	Real San Esteban	1–2	Aspirante	Cancha las Delicias, San Esteban Catarina, San Vicente
	Goal		Goal

22 February 2017	Aspirante	2–1	Real San Esteban	Estadio Municipal de Jucuapa
	César Meléndez		Goal

15 March 2017	Municipal Limeño	3–2	Aspirante	Estadio Jose Ramon Flores

29 March 2017	Municipal Limeño	5–2	Real San Esteban	Estadio Jose Ramon Flores

=== Group L ===
Pos	Team	Pld	W	D	L	GF	GA	GD	Pts	Qualification
1	Topiltzín	4	3	1	0	8	2	+6	10	Advance to knockout stage
2	Dragón	4	1	1	2	8	6	+2	4	
3	California	4	0	2	2	4	12	−8	2	

Rules for classification: Tiebreakers

19 October 2016	California	2–2	Dragón	Polideportivo Elías Ramírez, California, Usulután
			Jamal Jack 55'; Álvaro Bely 67'

26 October 2016	Topiltzín	1–0	Dragón	Estadio Topiltzín de Jiquilisco
	Carlos Ayala

November 2016	California	1–1	Topiltzín	Polideportivo Elías Ramírez, California, Usulután
	Carlos Benavídez		Carlos Ayala

22 February 2017	Topiltzín	4–0	California	Estadio Topiltzín de Jiquilisco
	Goal

16 March 2017	Dragón	1–2	Topiltzín	Polidepotivo Don Bosco
	Torres 14'		Alejo 25'; Maravilla 59'

28 March 2017	Dragón	5–1	California	Polideportivo Don Bosco

=== Ranking of second-placed teams ===
Pos	Grp	Team	Pld	W	D	L	GF	GA	GD	Pts	Qualification
1	B	Once Municipal	4	2	2	0	6	1	+5	8	Advance to knockout stage
2	I	Chagüite	4	2	1	1	10	5	+5	7	Advance to knockout stage
3	J	Jocoro	4	2	1	1	6	3	+3	7	Advance to knockout stage
4	E	El Roble	4	2	1	1	7	6	+1	7	Advance to knockout stage
5	F	Audaz	4	2	1	1	6	6	0	7	
6	G	Chalatenango	4	2	0	2	7	6	+1	6	
7	D	Atlético Comalapa	4	2	0	2	8	8	0	6	
8	K	Aspirante	4	2	0	2	7	7	0	6	
9	C	Once Lobos	4	1	2	1	5	2	+3	5	
10	L	Dragón	4	1	1	2	8	6	+2	4	
11	A	Espartano	4	1	1	2	5	8	−3	4	
12	H	Luis Ángel Firpo B	4	1	0	3	9	14	−5	3	

Source: -
Rules for classification: Tiebreakers

== Knockout stage ==
=== Qualified teams ===
The twelve group winners and the four best runners-up from the group stage qualify for the final stage.

Universidad de El Salvador were disqualified from this season's competition for failing to complete paperwork to be involved in any division, therefore making them ineligible.

Group	Winners	Runners-up
A	Isidro Metapán	—
B	FAS	Once Municipal
C	Juventud Cara Sucia	—
D	Universidad de El Salvador *	Atlético Comalapa
E	Santa Tecla	El Roble
F	Alianza	—
G	Sensunte Cabañas	—
H	Águila	—
I	Pasaquina	Chagüite
J	Luis Ángel Firpo	Jocoro
K	Municipal Limeño	—
L	Topiltzín	—

=== Quarter-finals ===
The draw for the round 16 was set to occur on 3 April 2017, but was postponed. No date has been set for this round to begin. Following discussion instead having a round robin competition they decided to change it to a single round knockout quarter finals. The round included three team from tercera division still in the competition, Juventud Cara Sucia, Sensuntepeque and CD Chaguite who were the lowest-ranked team in this round.

20 September 2017
15:00

Atletico Comalapa	4-3	A.D. Isidro Metapan
Edgar Valladares Jon Urbina, Carlos Martínez		Jose Antonio Ramos,,

Estadio Municipal de Comalapa
Referee: Marlon Menjivar

20 September 2017
15:00

El Roble (3)	1-1	C.D. Aguila (4)
David Gil 11'		Brayan Paz 18'

Estadio Mauricio Vides
Referee: Oscar Amaya

20 September 2017
15:00

C.D. Topiltzin (5)	1-1	Firpo (4)
Wilber Arizala		Ever Rodríguez

Estadio Topiltzin
Referee: Fermin Morales

20 September 2017
15:00

Juventud Cara Sucia	3-4	C.D. FAS
,,		Rafael Burgos 84'; Fernando Castillo 76'; Teobaldo Torres

Cancha Indes Barrio el Cavarro
Referee: Herber Reyes

20 September 2017
15:30

Once Municipal	1-3	Alianza F.C.
Carlos García 71'		Ricardo Guevara 56' 80'; Enríque Contreras 8'

Estadio Simeon Magana
Referee: Jorge Ponce

20 September 2017
15:00

Sensunte Cabañas	0-3	Santa Tecla F.C.
		William Canales; Bernardo Majano; Wanderson

Polideportivo Sensuntepeque
Referee: Waldir Garcia

20 September 2017
15:30

Chagüite (4)	0-0	C.D. Municipal Limeno (2)

Complejo Deportivo Tierra de Juego
Referee: Edgar Ramirez

20 September 2017
17:30

Jocoro F.C.	3-1	C.D. Pasaquina
Bryan Zuniga 10'; Gregory Costly 46'; Jonathan Sanchez 85'		Leston Paúl 22'

Complejo Deportivo Tierra de Juego
Referee: Lenin Sanchez

=== Semi-finals ===
Quarter-final winners	Winners
A	Atlético Comalapa
B	FAS
E	Santa Tecla
F	Alianza
H	Águila
I	Chagüite
E	Jocoro
L	Topiltzín

October 2017	Atlético Comalapa (2)	2-2	FAS (4)
	Carlos Martínez 7'; Julio Bernal 22'		Alan Murialdo 55'; William Mancía 62'

October 2017	Chagüite (4)	2-2	C.D. Aguila (3)	San Miguel
	Juan Hernandez 70'; Walter Alexis Alvarenga 82'		Ortíz 13'; TBD Own goal 80'	Stadium: Estadio Juan Francisco Barraza; Attendance: 59,454; Referee: Anthony Taylor

October 2017	Topiltzín (3)	1-1	Santa Tecla (4)	Usulutan
	Antonio Ruiz 11'		Ricardiño 79'	Stadium: Estadio de Jiquilisco

October 2017	Jocoro	0-2	Alianza	Morazan
			Rudy Clavel 83'; Roberto Monge 89'	Stadium: Complejo Deportivo Tierra de Fuego

=== Preliminary Finals ===
The draw for the semi-finals was held on 27 October 2017.

The semi-finals were played on 1 and 2 November 2017.

1 November 2017
7:30 pm

Alianza	0-1	Santa Tecla
		Juan Barahona 80'

Estadio Cuscatlán, San Salvador
Referee: Francisco Granados

2 November 2017
3:00 pm

C.D. FAS	1-0	Chaguite
William Mancía 45'

Estadio Quiteño

=== Grand Finals ===
22 November 2017
7:30 pm

Santa Tecla	1-0	C.D. FAS
Juan Barahona 51'

Estadio Cuscatlán, San Salvador
Referee: Ivan Barton
