= C.S. Ciclón del Golfo =

Association football club in El Salvador

Clube Sporte Ciclon del Golfo
- Full name: CS Ciclon del Golfo
- Founded: 2012
- Ground: Estadio Marcelino Imbers, La Unión, El Salvador
- League: Tercera Division de Fútbol Salvadoreño
- Apertura 2018: TBD

Club Social Ciclón del Golfo, commonly known as Ciclon de Golfo is a Salvadoran football club. They currently play in the Tercera Division de Fútbol Salvadoreño.

== History ==
=== Team foundation ===
The foundation of "Ciclón del Golfo" goes back to 2011, in which a group of owners and members will looking to fill the void left by the dissolution of Atletico Balboa.

In their very first season went on to win the 2012 Apertura season thanks to a two-one aggregate victory over fellow first timers in the Segunda division Turin FESA, despite losing the first leg one nil Ciclon were able to score two goals at home thanks to Franklin Vinosis Webster and to secure their maiden title.

== Honours ==
=== Leagues ===
- Segunda Division and predecessors (2nd tier)
  - Champions (1): 2012 Apertura
- La Asociación Departamental de Fútbol Aficionado and predecessors (3rd tier)
  - Champions (1): 2018 Clausura

=== Sponsors ===
- FILA
- Innova S port
- Ahorre En Acacu DE RL
- Farmancia Francisco
- Caja de Credito La Union

== Coaches ==
- (El Salvador) Nelson Mauricio Ancheta (Oct 2012 – June 2013)
- (Argentina) Jorge Chiqui Garcia (June 2013 – July 2013)
- (El Salvador) Francisco Robles (July 2013 – Oct 2013)
- (El Salvador) José Mario Martínez (Oct 2013 – Dec 2013)
- (El Salvador) Omar David Sevilla (Jan 2014 – June 2014)
- (El Salvador) David Ramírez (July 2014 – Nov 2014)
- (El Salvador) Leonel Guevara and Marvin Rosales (Nov 2014 – Dec 2014)
- (El Salvador) Mario Joya (Jan 2015 – Feb 2015)
- (Colombia) Luis Carlos Asprilla (Feb 2015 – Dec 2015)
- (El Salvador) Juan Evangelista Zelaya
- (Argentina) Andres Tabares (Jan 2016 – Feb 2016)
- (El Salvador)
- (Colombia) Luis Carlos Asprilla (Jan 2018 – July 2018)
- (El Salvador) David Armando Paz Bochinche (July 2018 – Aug 2018)
- (El Salvador) Francisco Robles (Aug 2018–)
- (Colombia) Luis Carlos Asprilla (2021-)

== See also ==
Atlético Balboa
