= Luis Carlos Asprilla =

Colombian footballer (born 1976)

Personal information
- Full name: Luis Carlos Asprilla Mosquera
- Date of birth: 1 July 1976 (age 50)
- Place of birth: Istmina, Colombia
- Height: 1.82 m (6 ft 0 in)
- Position: Forward

Senior career*
Years	Team	Apps	(Gls)
1991–1996	Deportivo Cali		
1996–1997	Deportivo Pereira		
1998	Huracán		
2001	Club Unión Central		
2002	Atlético Mariñense		
2002	Isidro Metapán		
2003	Atlético Balboa		
2004	San Salvador F.C.		
2004–2005	Atlético Balboa		
2005	Deportivo Pasto		
2007	Deportivo Galicia		
2007–2008	Atlético Balboa		
2008	Municipal Limeño		
2009	Temperley		
2009–2010	Atlético Balboa		
2010	Once Municipal		

Managerial career
- 2012–2014: Ciclon de Golfo (assistant coach)
- 2015: Ciclon de Golfo
- 2015–2016: Aspirante
- C.D. Liberal
- Pasaquina F.C. (assistant coach)
- 2016–2017: Fuerte San Francisco
- 2018: Ciclon de Golfo
- 2018: C.D. Chagüite
- * Club domestic league appearances and goals

Luis Carlos Asprilla Mosquera (born 1 July 1976) is a Colombian former professional footballer who played as a forward.
