= Football in El Salvador =

- Country: El Salvador
- Governing body: Salvadoran Football Association
- National team: Men's national team
- First played: 1862

National competitions
- Primera División de Fútbol de El Salvador

International competitions
- CONCACAF Champions Cup; CONCACAF Central American Cup; FIFA Club World Cup; CONCACAF Gold Cup (National Team); CONCACAF Nations League (National Team); FIFA World Cup (National Team); CONCACAF Women's Championship (National Team); CONCACAF W Gold Cup (National Team); FIFA Women's World Cup (National Team)

The sport of football in the country of El Salvador is run by the Salvadoran Football Association. The association administers the national football team, as well as the Primera División de Fútbol de El Salvador, the top level in its league system. Football is the most popular sport in the country. Approximately 50% of the people in El Salvador are considered football fans. The other countries in Central America with an equal or higher percentage are Belize, Costa Rica, Guatemala, Honduras and Panama.

== National team ==
El Salvador qualified for the FIFA World Cup twice, in 1970 and 1982. On both occasions the team was eliminated in the first round after losing all three matches.

A qualifying match against Honduras for the 1970 tournament was so hotly contested that it was the spark that brought a state of war between El Salvador and Honduras. The conflict became known as the Football War.

The 1982 tournament included a 10-1 mauling from Hungary that provided the most goals in a game in the history of the finals as well as equalling the record for winning margin.

Outside of the World Cup, El Salvador competes regularly at the CONCACAF Gold Cup and the CONCACAF Nations League. Its sole international triumph came in a regional competition, the 1943 CCCF Championship.

== League system ==
The main league competition in El Salvador is the Primera División de Fútbol de El Salvador. It is fed into by the Segunda División de Fútbol Salvadoreño which in turn is fed into by the Tercera Division de Fútbol Salvadoreño. The most successful team has been C.D. FAS with 18 league titles, followed by C.D. Águila with 14. The top Salvadorean clubs also participate in the CONCACAF Champions League, a competition won by Alianza F.C. in 1967 and C.D. Águila in 1976. Alianza and C.D. Platense Municipal Zacatecoluca have also won the defunct Copa Interclubes UNCAF once each.

Level	League(s)/Division(s)
1	Primera División de Fútbol de El Salvador; 12 clubs
	↓↑ 1 club
2	Segunda División; 24 clubs divided in 2 series of 12
	↓↑ 2 clubs
3	Tercera Division; 40 clubs divided in 4 series of 10

== Football stadiums in El Salvador ==
Stadium	Location	Capacity	Tenants	Image
Estadio Cuscatlán	San Salvador	44,836	El Salvador national football team, Alianza F.C., C.D. Atlético Marte	
Estadio Óscar Quiteño	Santa Ana	17,500	C.D. FAS	
Estadio Correcaminos	San Francisco Gotera	12,000	C.D. Chagüite, C.D. Fuerte San Francisco	
Estadio Juan Francisco Barraza	San Miguel	10,000	C.D. Águila	
Estadio Las Delicias	Santa Tecla	10,000	Santa Tecla F.C.	

== Attendances ==
The average attendance per top-flight football league season and the club with the highest average attendance:

Season	League average	Best club	Best club average
2015 Clausura	1,506	Alianza FC	4,732

== See also ==
- Lists of stadiums
