= Nelson Mauricio Ancheta =

Salvadoran football player

Personal information
- Full name: Nelson Mauricio Ancheta Flores
- Date of birth: 30 July 1963 (age 63)
- Place of birth: Chalchuapa, El Salvador
- Position: Midfielder

Senior career*
Years	Team	Apps	(Gls)
1982–1986	Once Lobos		
- Universidad Católica (reserves)
1987–1988	UCA		
1989–1994	Once Lobos		
1995–1997	Huracán		

Managerial career
- 1987: Fuerte Fronterizo
- 1994: Juventud Candelareña
- 1996–1998: Once Lobos
- 1999: Isidro Metapán
- 2000–2004: FAS reserves
- 2006: FAS
- 2006: Atlético Balboa
- 2006–2007: Once Municipal
- 2007–2008: FAS
- 2009: Nejapa
- 2009: Alianza
- 2009: Once Municipal
- 2009–2010: Águila
- 2010–2011: Once Municipal
- 2011–2012: LA Firpo
- 2012–2013: Ciclón del Golfo
- 2013: Liberal
- 2013–2014: Dragón
- 2014–2015: LA Firpo
- 2015: Deportivo Malacateco
- 2015: Chalatenango
- 2016: Independiente
- 2016–2017: Dragón
- 2018: Chagüite
- 2018: Jocoro
- 2018–2019: Sonsonate
- 2019: Chagüite
- 2019: Jocoro
- 2019–2020: El Vencedor
- 2020–2021: Municipal Limeño
- 2022: Real Atletico Sonsonate
- 2022: Once Lobos
- 2023: Cacahuatique
- 2023: Municipal Limeño
- 2024: Fuerte San Francisco
- 2024-2025: FAS (reserves)
- 2025-Present: Zacatecoluca
- * Club domestic league appearances and goals

Nelson Mauricio Ancheta Flores (born 30 July 1963 in Chalchuapa) is a former Salvadoran professional football player and currently manager of Fuerte San Francisco.

== Playing career ==
Nelson Ancheta began his career playing at Universidad Católica de El Salvador during his youth. Afterwards he joined Once Lobos where he would play eleven years in two different spells (playing in between the Primera División and Segunda División). He would go on to play for Universidad Centroamericana José Simeón Cañas and Huracán; the latter would be where he would finish his playing career in 1997.

== Coaching career ==
=== Fuerte Fronterizo ===
Ancheta's coaching career began in 1987, debuting with Fuerte Fronterizo in the Segunda División. However, he had to wait until 1994 to coach a first team squad, this time with Juventud Candelareña in the Tercera División.

=== Once Lobos ===
This was followed with coaching the club he had played in previously, Once Lobos, both the reserves and then later the main team (playing in the Segunda División at the time).

=== Isidro Menéndez ===
In 1999, he coached Isidro Menéndez, now known as Isidro Metapán. In 2000, he became the assistant coach of Agustín Castillo in FAS main team, and the coach of FAS reserve team. During these periods, FAS won five championships and Ancheta managed to coach FAS in 11 games.

=== Atlético Balboa ===
Afterward, he coached Atlético Balboa in 2006.

=== Once Municipal ===
Ancheta was offered the coaching job for Once Municipal, which led to his most successful tenure in his coaching career, winning his first and so far only domestic title with them (winning the Apertura 2006 title after defeating his old club FAS 3–1), while also winning the Copa Presidente 2006–2007 against Águila (1–0 victory).

=== Return to FAS ===
However, the difference with the club's president meant that he left his coaching position. He then returned to FAS to take over as head coach of the team. He took the club to two consecutive finals (Apertura 2007 and Clausura 2008); however, he lost on both occasions.

=== Nejapa FC ===
He left the club after a disagreement with the board of the club and joined low table team Nejapa FC in 2009. With smart recruitment and clever tactics he took Nejapa FC to their first and only semi-finals in the Clausura 2009. However, the club was destroyed 6–1 on aggregate by Isidro Metapán and he left the club following this loss.

He coached various clubs in the next couple of years, including Once Municipal, Alianza, Águila and Luis Ángel Firpo, with varying degrees of success.

=== Ciclón del Golfo ===
He then joined the newly formed club Ciclón del Golfo in 2012 and helped them win the Apertura 2012 de la Segunda División after a 2–1 aggregate victory over Turín FESA.

=== Dragón ===
He then took over the reins of Dragón and led them to the club's first final (Clausura 2014) in Clausura/Apertura format and almost helped Dragón win their first title in 70 years. However, the club lost against Isidro Metapán on penalties in that final. A pay dispute with the Dragón board of directors meant that he left the club, in May 2014. Ancheta was replaced by Roberto Gamarra.

=== Return to Luis Ángel Firpo ===
Ancheta joined Luis Ángel Firpo in 2014 in the quest to regain promotion back into the Primera División. However, in their first campaign, despite going 16 games undefeated in the regular season, they were knocked out in the quarter-finals by Marte Soyapango.

=== Deportivo Malacateco ===
Ancheta had his first coaching job abroad by coaching Deportivo Malacateco in Guatemala, however his time there was a poor one in the fourteen games he coached the team won two games, drew four and lost eleven. On 5 November 2015, he resigned as coach of Deportivo Malacateco.

=== Chalatenango ===
After passing through Guatemala, he joined Chalatenango. But surprisingly Ancheta resigned due to the dispute of two directives to gain control of the team.

=== Independiente FC ===
In 2016 Ancheta joined Independiente FC of the Segunda División.

=== Return to Dragón ===
In September 2016, he returned to Dragón, at a time when the team was going through an administrative, economic and sports crisis. Ancheta left the club in February 2017 due to poor results in the matches and was replaced by Víctor Coreas.

=== Chagüite ===
In 2018, he signed with Chagüite.

=== Jocoro ===
However, months later he would return to the Primera División with Jocoro, newly promoted team. With the team of Morazán Ancheta brings regular results, making Jocoro the revelation team of the Apertura 2018 tournament.

=== Sonsonate ===
On 11 December 2018, Ancheta signed as new coach of Sonsonate for the Clausura 2019, replacing Hugo Ovelar.

== Manager stats ==
Team	Nat	From	To	Record				
Team	Nat	From	To	G	W	D	L	Win %
FAS	(El Salvador)	2005	2005	12	4	5	3	
FAS	(El Salvador)	2007	2008	62	27	18	17	
Atletico Balboa	(El Salvador)	2006	2006	18	6	5	7	
Once Municipal	(El Salvador)	2006	2007	41	16	17	8	
Once Municipal	(El Salvador)	2010	2011	22	3	8	11	
Nejapa	(El Salvador)	2009	2009	20	7	8	5	
Alianza	(El Salvador)	2009	2009	13	4	7	2	
Aguila	(El Salvador)	2010	2010	11	5	5	1	
LA Firpo	(El Salvador)	2011	2012	41	17	12	12	
Dragon	(El Salvador)	2013	2014	35	14	11	10	
Malacateco	(Guatemala)	July 2015	November 2015	14	2	4	11	
Dragon	(El Salvador)	September 2016	January 2017	20	2	7	11	10%
Jocoro	(El Salvador)	June 2018	August 2019	28				
Sonsonate	(El Salvador)	December 2018	February 2019	8	1	2	5	12.5%
El Vencedor	(El Salvador)	December 2019	March 2020	11				
Municipal Limeno	(El Salvador)	October 2020	May 2021	33	13	10	10	49.5%
Atletico Marte	(El Salvador)	June 2021	June 2022	24				
Fuerte San Francisco	(El Salvador)	February 2024	May 2024	16	4	3	9	25%

== Honours ==
=== Playing ===
==== Club ====
Once Lobos

- Primera División
  - Third Place: 1982, 1983

=== Manager ===
==== Club ====
Once Municipal

- Primera División
  - Champions: Apertura 2006
- Copa Presidente
  - Champions: 2006-2007

C.D. FAS

- Primera División
  - Runners-up: Apertura 2007, Clausura 2008

Ciclón del Golfo

- Segunda División
  - Champions: 2012 Apertura

Dragón

- Primera División
  - Runners-up: Clausura 2014
