= Carlos Recinos =

Salvadoran footballer (born 1950)

Personal information
- Full name: Carlos Humberto Recinos Ortíz
- Date of birth: 30 June 1950 (age 76)
- Place of birth: San Salvador, El Salvador
- Height: 1.68 m (5 ft 6 in)
- Position: Defender

Youth career
- 1965–1967: Phillips

Senior career*
Years	Team	Apps	(Gls)
1967–1982	FAS		
1984	UES		
1985	Alianza		

International career
1976–1982	El Salvador	37	(0)

Managerial career
- Malocas de Coatepeque
- 1993–1995: Once Municipal
- 1996–1998: Huracan of Atiquizaya
- 2000–2002: El Salvador
- 2004–2005: Once Lobos
- 2009–2012: Turín FESA
- 2012–2013: FAS
- * Club domestic league appearances and goals

Carlos Humberto Recinos Ortíz (born 30 June 1950) is a retired football player from El Salvador.

== Playing years ==
=== Club career ===
Nicknamed Imacasa after the company he worked for, Recinos began his professional football career at FAS where he stayed for sixteen years. He won three domestic titles with FAS (1977–78, 1978–79, 1981) and helped them capture their first and so far only international title when they won the CONCACAF Champions' Cup in 1979. After his contract with FAS ended in 1982, he spent two years on the sidelines following an injury before signing with UES for one year in 1984. In 1985, he joined Alianza and was part of the team that made the final against Atlético Marte. However, they were defeated by Atlético Marte in extra time and this would be his swansong as he retired soon after.

=== International career ===
He also played for El Salvador for 10 years and represented his country in 16 FIFA World Cup qualification matches and at the 1982 FIFA World Cup in Spain. Recinos also played for El Salvador at the 1975 Pan American Games.

== Managing years ==
During his twilight playing years, he trained to be a football coach and graduated as a soccer technical-director from AEFES (Association of soccer Trainers of El Salvador) in 1984. His first experience at the Primera División de Fútbol de El Salvador was while serving as assistant coach to Costa Rican Marvin Rodríguez at FAS. He became the national coach of El Salvador's Under 17, Under 20 and senior national football teams. In the Segunda División de Fútbol Salvadoreño, he directed Once Lobos of Chalchuapa, Huracán of Atiquizaya, Once Municipal of Ahuachapán, and Malocas of Coatepeque.

He founded C.D FAS's Infanto-Youthful school of soccer, from where some outstanding youthful soccer players came out of, like Gerald arose Towns, Alfredo Pacheco, Luis Castro, Juan Flores and Hellman Monterroso.

== Managerial stats ==
Team	Nat	From	To	Record				
Team	Nat	From	To	G	W	D	L	%
Once Lobos	(El Salvador)	2004	January 2005	0	0	0	0	00.00
El Salvador	(El Salvador)	October 2000	May 2002	16	5	6	5	00.00
