= Recinos =

Recinos is a Hispanic surname.

The surname Recinos ranked 13,427 out of 88,799 in the United States.

Notable people with the surname include:

- Adrián Recinos (1886–1962), Guatemalan essayist, historian and Mayanist scholar
- Cándido Amador Recinos (1958–1997), Honduran political activist
- Carlos Recinos (born 1950), Salvadoran footballer
- Christian Recinos (born 1994), American-born Guatemalan footballer
- Efraín Recinos (1928–2011), Guatemalan architect, muralist, urbanist, painter and sculptor
- María Chinchilla Recinos (1909–1944), Guatemalan schoolteacher
