= Hugo Ovelar =

Paraguayan footballer (born 1971)

Personal information
- Full name: Hugo Marcelo Ovelar Irrazábal
- Date of birth: 21 February 1971 (age 55)
- Place of birth: Concepción, Paraguay
- Position: Forward

Team information
- Current team: Deportivo Santaní (manager)

Youth career
- Mariscal López

Senior career*
| Years | Team | Apps | (Gls) |
| 1989–1990 | River Plate Asunción | | |
| | Olimpia | 0 | (0) |
- Sport Colombia
- Tembetary
| 1994 | San Lorenzo | 4 | (0) |
| 1995–1997 | Guaraní | 44 | (18) |
| 1998 | Cerro Porteño | 21 | (8) |
| 1999 | Sportivo Luqueño | | |
| 1999–2000 | Santos Laguna | 48 | (2) |
| 2001 | Libertad | 9 | (1) |
| 2001–2002 | Guaraní | 17 | (1) |
| 2002 | Cerro Porteño | 11 | (0) |
| 2003 | Cobreloa | 8 | (1) |
| 2004 | Sol de América | 22 | (4) |
| 2005 | 2 de Mayo | 17 | (3) |
| 2005 | Sportivo Patria | 7 | (1) |
| 2006 | La Paz | 18 | (2) |
| 2006 | General Caballero ZC | 9 | (0) |
| 2009 | Porvenir Alteño | – | (–) |

International career
| 1997–1999 | Paraguay | | |

Managerial career
- 2010–2012: 13 de Junio
- 2013: 3 de Febrero
- 2013: Liga Concepcionera
- 2014: 4 de Octubre
- 2015: Martín Ledesma
- 2015–2016: Pasaquina
- 2017: Municipal Limeño
- 2018: Sonsonate
- 2021: Atyrá
- 2021: 2 de Mayo
- 2022: Deportivo Santaní
- 2023: Rubio Ñu
- 2024: Sportivo Carapeguá
- 2024: Sportivo San Lorenzo
- * Club domestic league appearances and goals

Hugo Marcelo Ovelar Irrazábal (born 21 February 1971) is a Paraguayan former professional footballer, who played for clubs in Paraguay, Argentina, Chile, Mexico and Bolivia and in the Paraguay national team at the 1997 Copa América and 1999 Copa América. He currently is a football manager.

== Playing career ==
Born in Concepción, Paraguay, Ovelar was trained at club Mariscal López. He stood out with Cerro Porteño and Guaraní in his homeland. He also played for clubs such as River Plate, Olimpia, Sport Colombia, Tembetary, Sportivo Luqueño, among others.

Abroad, he played for Argentine club San Lorenzo de Almagro in 1994. In other countries, he played for Mexican club Santos Laguna, the Chilean club Cobreloa and the Bolivian club La Paz.

== Coaching career ==
=== Pasaquina ===
In December 2015, Ovelar signed as new coach of Pasaquina of the Salvadoran Primera División, replacing Víctor Coreas. In January 2017, Ovelar was replaced by Omar Sevilla.

=== Municipal Limeño ===
In February 2016, Ovelar signed as new coach of Municipal Limeño, replacing Francisco Robles for the rest of the Clausura 2017. In December 2017, Ovelar was replaced by Emiliano Barrera.

=== Sonsonate ===
In September 2018, Ovelar was announced as new coach of Sonsonate, replacing Mario Elias Guevara for the rest of the Apertura 2018, after a 2–5 defeat against Alianza. In December 2018, Ovelar was replaced by Nelson Mauricio Ancheta.

== Honours ==
Cobreloa

- Primera División de Chile: 2003 Apertura, 2003 Clausura
