= Oscar Pianetti =

Argentine footballer (born 1942)

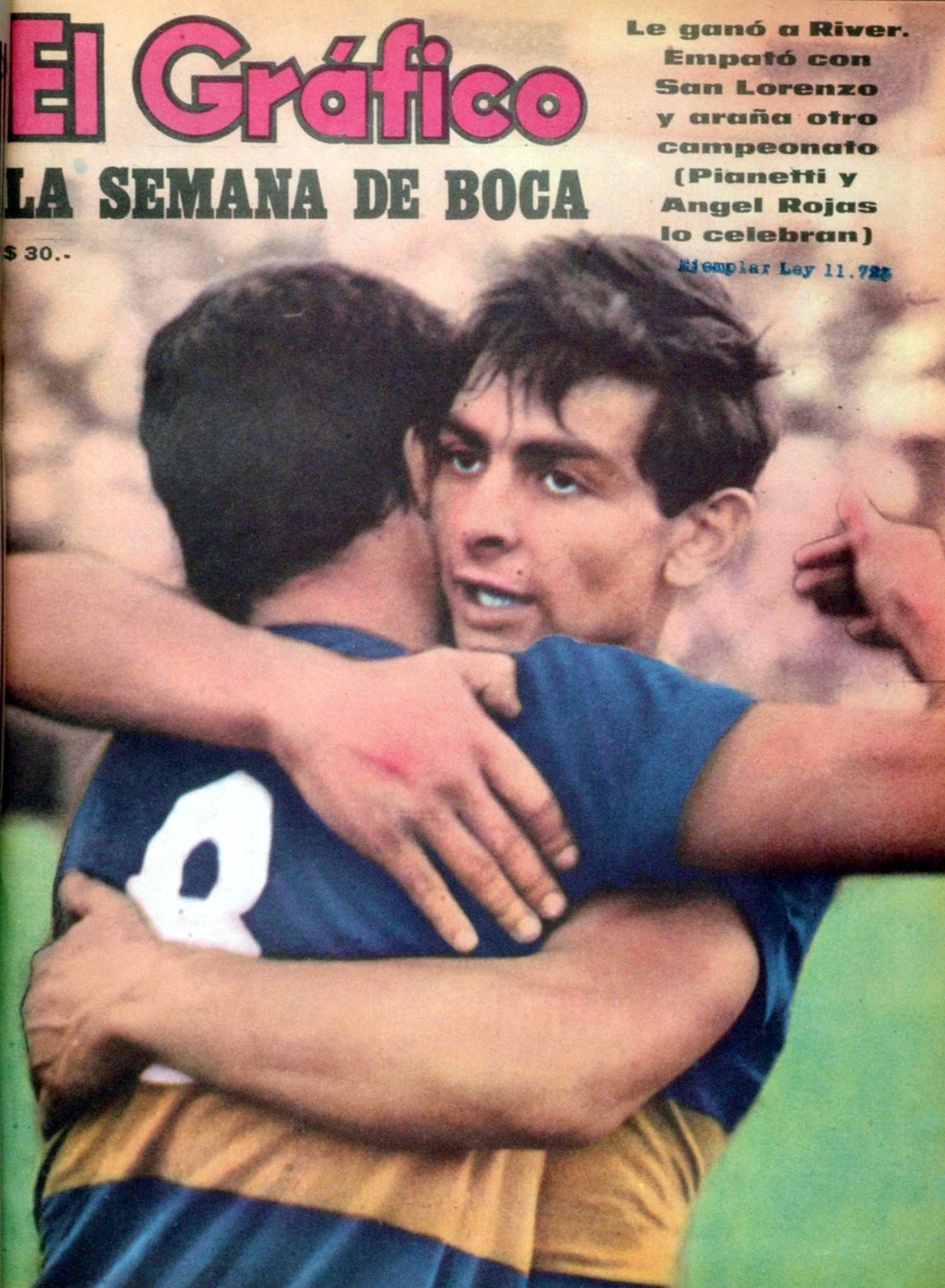

Personal information
- Full name: Oscar Antonio Pianetti
- Date of birth: 1 October 1942 (age 84)
- Place of birth: General Racedo, Entre Ríos, Argentina
- Position: Forward

Youth career
- Boca Juniors

Senior career*
Years	Team	Apps	(Gls)
1964–1971	Boca Juniors	173	(41)
1972–1974	Unión Tumán		
1975	Emelec	14	(6)
1975	Colo-Colo	6	(1)
1976	Deportes Quindío		
1977	Deportes Tolima		
1978	Municipal Puntarenas		
1979–1980	Once Lobos		
1980–1981	Independiente Chiquimula		
- * Club domestic league appearances and goals

Oscar Antonio Pianetti (born 1 October 1942) is an Argentine former professional footballer who played as a forward for Argentinian club Boca Juniors from 1964 to 1971, subsequently playing club football in Chile, Peru, Colombia, Ecuador, Costa Rica, El Salvador and Guatemala.

== Career ==
- (Argentina) Boca Juniors 1964–1971
- (Peru) Unión Tumán 1972–1974
- (Ecuador) Emelec 1975
- (Chile) Colo-Colo 1975
- (Colombia) Deportes Quindío 1976
- (Colombia) Deportes Tolima 1977
- (Costa Rica) Municipal Puntarenas 1978
- (El Salvador) Once Lobos 1979–1980
- (Guatemala) Independiente Chiquimula 1980–1981

== Honours ==
Boca Juniors

- Argentine Primera División: 1964, 1965, 1969, 1970
