= Kordell Samuel =

Trinidadian footballer (born 1985)

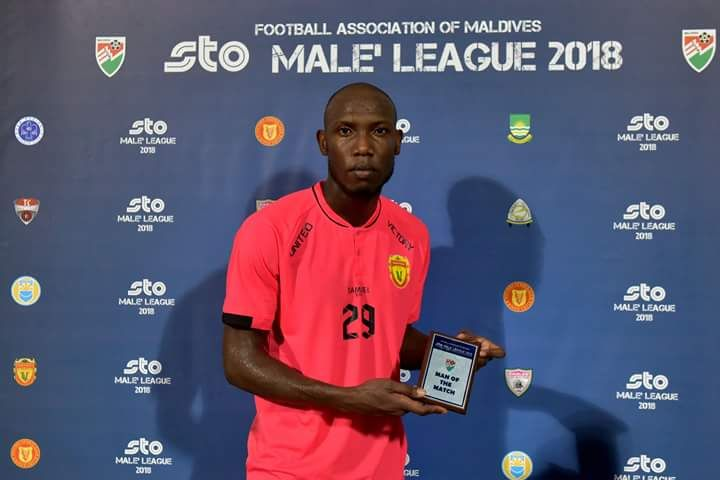
- Samuel with a Dhivehi Premier League Man of the Match award

Personal information
- Full name: Kordell Devone Samuel
- Date of birth: 28 February 1985 (age 41)
- Place of birth: Trinidad and Tobago
- Height: 1.86 m (6 ft 1 in)
- Positions: Striker; winger

Youth career
- Caledonia AIA

Senior career*
| Years | Team | Apps | (Gls) |
| 2005–2006 | North East Stars F.C. | | |
| 2006–2008 | Joe Public | | |
| 2008–2011 | Caledonia AIA | | |
| 2011 | Brooklyn Italians | 10 | (9) |
| 2011–2013 | PDRM FA | 33 | (10) |
| 2013–2014 | Nakhon Pathom United | 17 | (1) |
| 2015 | Pasaquina | 14 | (2) |
| 2015–2016 | Chalatenango | 36 | (2) |
| 2016 | Morvant Caledonia United | 15 | (6) |
| 2017 | North East Stars F.C. | 10 | (7) |
| 2018 | United Victory | 30 | (20) |
| 2019 | Broncos del Sur | 10 | (8) |
| 2020 | North East Stars F.C. | 11 | (7) |
| 2021 | T.C. Sports Club | 15 | (8) |

International career
| 2004–2005 | Trinidad and Tobago U20 | 9 | (5) |
- * Club domestic league appearances and goals

Kordell Devone Samuel (born 28 February 1985) is a Trinidadian former professional footballer who played as a striker or winger.

== Career ==
Kordell Samuel was born in Trinidad and Tobago. He started his career in the TT Pro League at a young age playing for clubs such as Caledonia AIA, North East Stars, and Joe Public

In 2012–2013, Samuel signed with PDRM FA in the Malaysia Premier League, and later on transferred to Nakhon Pathom United for the 2013–14 season in the Thai Division 1 League.

On 17 January 2015, Samuel signed a one–year contract with Salvadoran Primera División side Pasaquina. He debuted with C.D. Pasaquina on 24 January 2015, playing 90 minutes in a 0–0 against FAS at Estadio Oscar Quiteño. He scored his first goal in Pasaquina's jersey in a 1–0 win over Atlético Marte on 18 February 2015 in Pasaquina.

After his first Clausura season in El Salvador, Samuel transferred to Chalatenango. He scored his first goal for Chalatenango in a 2–1 home win at the 93rd minute vs UES on 19 September 2015.
