= Mauricio Alvarenga =

Salvadoran footballer (born 1951)

Personal information
- Full name: Mauricio Laureano Alvarenga Barraza
- Date of birth: 24 June 1951 (age 75)
- Place of birth: El Salvador
- Position: Goalkeeper

Youth career
- –1967: Atlético Marte

Senior career*
Years	Team	Apps	(Gls)
1967–1972	Atlético Marte		
1972–1973	Juventud Olímpica		
1973–1974	Municipal		
1974–1975	Negocios Internacionales		
1975–1976	Tapachulteca		
1978–1980	Once Lobos		
1980–1982	Atlético Marte		
1986–1987	Once Lobos		
1987–1988	CESSA		
1998–1999	San Joaquin		

International career
- El Salvador U20
	El Salvador		(0)

Managerial career
- 1993–1995: Atlético Marte
- 1996: Once Lobos
- 1999: Dragón
- 1999: El Salvador (goalkeeping)
- 2005: Once Municipal
- 2006–2007: Once Lobos
- 2007: Fuerte San Francisco
- 2008–2009: Malacoff
- 2010–2011: Once Lobos
- * Club domestic league appearances and goals

Mauricio Laureano Alvarenga Barraza (born 24 June 1951) is a Salvadoran retired footballer who played as a goalkeeper.

== Club career ==
Alvarenga played the majority of his career in the Primera División de Fútbol de El Salvador, representing clubs such as Atlético Marte, Juventud Olímpica, Tapachulteca, Once Lobos, and CESSA. He spent two seasons abroad, one in Guatemala with Municipal and one in Belize with San Joaquin.

== International career ==
Alvarenga was the first-choice goalkeeper for the El Salvador under-20 side that won the 1964 CONCACAF Youth Tournament. It marked the first time that El Salvador won a CONCACAF youth championship.

Alvarenga earned caps for the El Salvador national team in the 1970s. He represented his country in 1973 and 1977 CONCACAF Championship qualification.

== Honors ==
Atlético Marte

- Primera División de Fútbol de El Salvador: 1968–69, 1970, 1982

Once Lobos

- Segunda División de El Salvador: 1995–96

Municipal

- Copa Fraternidad Centroamericana: 1974

El Salvador

- CONCACAF Under-20 Championship: 1964
