= C.D. Pasaquina =

Association football club in El Salvador

Escuelita de Futbol de Pasaquina
- Full name: Club Deportivo Pasaquina Fútbol Club
- Nickname: Los Burros
- Founded: 1962
- Dissolved: 20 July 2019; 6 years ago
- Ground: Estadio Marcelino Imbers, La Unión, El Salvador
- Capacity: 5,000
- Chairman: Abilio Menjívar
- Manager: Josué Manuel Romero
- League: Tercera División
Home colours	Away colours

Escuelita de Futbol de Pasaquina, commonly known as EF Pasaquina, was a Salvadoran professional football club based in Pasaquina, La Unión Department.

They last played in the Tercera División.

== History ==
The club was founded as Club Deportivo Pasaquina Futbol Clube, or Pasaquina F.C. for short in 1962.

Pasaquina came close to being promoted to the Primera División in 1996, but they lost a round-robin tournament to Chalatenango and Metapan.

The club won the 2013 Apertura. The club failed to win the 2014 Clausura title, which meant the club were forced to play in a promotion play-off against Once Lobos over two Legs, which Pasaquina won 2–1. The win allowed the club to be promoted to the Primera División for the first time in their history.

On 3 July 2019, Pasaquina failed to meet the requirements that FESFUT had placed for clubs to be eligible to play in the Primera División by failing to pay outstanding debts. The club will be forced to sell their spot in Primera División.

After 2 years Hiatus, In 2022 the club reformed as Escuelas de Futbol de Pasaquina, the club were promoted to the tercera division. In June 2023, the club transferred ownership, changing its name to "Escuelita de futbol de Pasaquina".

== Honours ==
- Segunda Division
  - Champions (1): Apertura 2013
  - Promotion Play-off Winners (1): 2013–14
- Tercera Division
  - Champions (1): Zona Oriental 2010

== Stadium ==
- Estadio San Sebastian; Pasaquina (2005–2018)
- Estadio Jose Ramon Flores; Santa Rosa de Lima (2014) 1 game in Primera División
- Estadio Marcelino Imbers, La Unión, El Salvador (2018–present)

Pasaquina currently plays their home games at Estadio Marcelino Imbers in La Union, due to low attendance and meeting the Primera División's new footballing standards. The club previously played their home games at Estadio San Sebastián in Pasaquina. Pasaquina have occasionally held home games at Estadio Jose Ramon Flores in Santa Rosa de Lima.

== Current squad ==
Note: Flags indicate national team as defined under FIFA eligibility rules; some limited exceptions apply. Players may hold more than one non-FIFA nationality.

No.	Pos.	Nation	Player
1	GK	SLV	Herson Gonzalez
6	MF	SLV	Carlos Rubio
9	FW	SLV	Jose Izaguirre
10	FW	SLV	Alcides Valladares
12	MF	SLV	Selvin Velazquez

No.	Pos.	Nation	Player
16	DF	SLV	Ronaldo Barahona
28	DF	SLV	Andres Gonzalez
20	MF	SLV	Josue Guzman
30	DF	SLV	Jack Cruz
36	MF	SLV	Cristian Zalazar
37	MF	SLV	Isaac Garcia

=== Out on loan ===
Note: Flags indicate national team as defined under FIFA eligibility rules; some limited exceptions apply. Players may hold more than one non-FIFA nationality.

No.	Pos.	Nation	Player
—	FW	SLV	TBD (at TBD for the 2018–19 season)
—	MF	SLV	TBD (at TBD for the 2018–19 season)

No.	Pos.	Nation	Player
—	MF	SLV	TBD (at TBD for the 2018–19 season)
—	DF	SLV	TBD (at TBD for the 2018–19 season)

=== In ===
Note: Flags indicate national team as defined under FIFA eligibility rules; some limited exceptions apply. Players may hold more than one non-FIFA nationality.

No.	Pos.	Nation	Player
—		SLV	Alvaro Lizama (from Aguila)
—	FW	COL	Dilan Lloreda (from Atlético Vega Real)
—	MF	MEX	José Manuel Piñeiro Martínez (from Ocelotes de la UNACH)

No.	Pos.	Nation	Player
—		SLV	TBD (from TBD)
—		SLV	TBD (from TBD)
—		SLV	TBD (from TBD)

=== Out ===
Note: Flags indicate national team as defined under FIFA eligibility rules; some limited exceptions apply. Players may hold more than one non-FIFA nationality.

No.	Pos.	Nation	Player
—		PAR	Arnulfo Colmán (To TBD)
—		SLV	TBD (To TBD)
—		SLV	TBD (To TBD)

No.	Pos.	Nation	Player
—		SLV	TBD (To TBD)
—		SLV	TBD (To TBD)
—		SLV	TBD (To TBD)

== Reserve League squad ==
Pasaquina's reserve squad plays in the twelve-team Primera División Reserves (El Salvador). Current members of the squad are:

Note: Flags indicate national team as defined under FIFA eligibility rules; some limited exceptions apply. Players may hold more than one non-FIFA nationality.

No.	Pos.	Nation	Player
31		SLV	Miguel Ángel Lazo
34		SLV	Emerson García
35		SLV	José Romero
36		SLV	Alexis Pineda
37		SLV	José Pérez Torres
40		SLV	Yelvin Guevara
41		SLV	Marvin Garmendia
42		SLV	Erick Leiva Hernández
43		SLV	Kevin Pérez Galindo

No.	Pos.	Nation	Player
44		SLV	Josué Guzmán
45		SLV	Geison Montesinos
48		SLV	Juan García
49		SLV	Jackson Álvarez
50		SLV	Álex Palacios
51		SLV	Ulises Santos
52		SLV	Jorge Posadas Luna
53		SLV	Alcides Valladares
60		SLV	Gerson Canales

== List of coaches ==
- (Honduras) Thomas Good López
- (El Salvador) Geovanni Portillo
- (El Salvador) Jose Ramon Aviles
- (El Salvador) David Ramírez (2010–12)
- (El Salvador) Esteban Melara (2013–13)
- (El Salvador) David Ramírez (2013 – 14 June)
- (Argentina) Jorge García (July 2014 – 14 Dec)
- (Argentina) Juan Andrés Sarulyte (Dec 2014 – 15 May)
- (El Salvador) Víctor Coreas (June 2015 – 15 Dec)
- (Paraguay) Hugo Ovelar (Dec 2015 – Dec 2016)
- (El Salvador) Omar Sevilla (Jan 2017 – Sep 2017)
- (El Salvador) Manuel Carranza Murillo (Sep 2017 – Feb 2018)
- (El Salvador) Francisco Robles (interim) (Feb 2018 – June 2018)
- (Brazil) Eraldo Correia (June 2018 – Feb 2019)
- (El Salvador) Jose Manuel Romero (Feb 2019 -June 2019)

Escuelas de Futbol de Pasaquina

- (El Salvador) Oscar Pacheco (June 2022 - January 2023)
- (El Salvador) Rafael Flores (January 2023 - February 2023)
- (El Salvador) Roberto Chavez (February 2023 - March 20230
- (El Salvador) Ciro Romero (March 2023 - July 2023)

Escuelita de Futol de Pasaquina

- (El Salvador) Ciro Romero (July 2023 - Present)

== Former players ==
The following list includes players that have appeared in at least 100 league games and/or have reached international status.

- (El Salvador) Javier Moisés Hernández
- (El Salvador) Emerson Véliz
- (Trinidad and Tobago) Kordell Samuel
- (Trinidad and Tobago) Leston Paul
- (El Salvador) Isidro Gutiérrez
- (Panama) (El Salvador) Nicolás Muñoz
- (Paraguay) Javier Lezcano
- (Saint Kitts and Nevis) Devaughn Elliott

=== International capped players ===
El Salvador.

- (El Salvador) Christian Javier Bautista
- (El Salvador) Isidro Gutiérrez

CONCACAF.

- (Panama) Nicolás Muñoz
- (Trinidad and Tobago) Leston Paul
- (Trinidad and Tobago) Kordell Samuel
- (Saint Kitts and Nevis) Devaughn Elliott

== Champion of scoring per season ==
=== Best Scorer ===
Season	First Name	Number of Goals Scored
Clausura 2016	(Paraguay) Javier Lezcano	11 Goals

Achievement	Record (Year Division)
Highest league finish	Eighth in Apertura 2017 (TBD)
Most League Points in a Season	101 in 2018 (TBD)
Record victory	4–1 vs Atletico Marte, 2015; 4–1 vs Audaz, 3 September 2019
Record home victory	4–1 vs Atletico Marte, 2015; 4–1 vs Audaz, 3 September 2019
Record away victory	5–3 vs UES, 27 September 2016; 3–1 vs Chalatenango, 25 March 2018
Record defeat	0–8 vs Santa Tecla F.C., 2016
Record home defeat	0–4 vs Alianza F.C., 2015; 0–4 vs C.D. Luis Angel Firpo, 2016
Record away defeat	0–8 vs Santa Tecla F.C., 2016
Record Copa El Salvador Victory	2–1 vs La Asunción, 15 March 2017; 2–1 Chagüite, 23 November 2016
Record Copa El Salvador defeat	1–4 vs Chagüite, 29 March 2017
Most successive victories	TBD matches (from 26 December 1999 to 7 March 2000)
Most games without a win	TBD matches (from 18 October 2008 to 13 January 2009)
Most successive defeats	TBD matches (from 11 April 1990 to 15 September 1990)
Most successive draws	TBD matches (from 13 December 1992 to 16 January 1993)
Longest unbeaten	TBD matches (from 4 October 1980 to 20 December 1980)
Record home attendance	3,000 vs Once Lobos, Apertura 2013 Liga de Plata, 28 December 2013
Record lowest home attendance	340 vs Firpo, 2018
Record league attendance	68,160 vs TBD, 17 October 1936
Record Gate Receipts	£400,920 vs TBD, 19 February 2005

=== Player records ===
Achievement	Player (Record)
Most appearances	TBD (623)
Most appearances (outfield)	Tony Garcia (155)
Most goals	TBD (168)
Most hat-tricks	Gustavo Guerreño (1)
Most National capped player	Devaughn Elliott (29)
Most national capped player while at the club	Leston Paul (3)
Oldest player	Nicolas Munoz (36 years and 239 days)
Youngest player	Franklin Torres (15 years and 00 days)
Oldest scorer	Nicolas Munoz (36 years and 239 days)
Youngest scorer	TBD (16 years and 310 days)
Quickest scorer	TBD (9 seconds)
Quickest sending off	TBD (3 minutes)

=== Most appearances ===
No.	Player	period	Appearances
1	(El Salvador) Tony Garcia	TBD-TBD	173
1	(El Salvador) Carlos Arevalo	TBD-TBD	164
2	(El Salvador) Kevin Sagastizado	TBD-TBD	145
3	(El Salvador) Juan Jose Romero	TBD-TBD	141
4	(El Salvador) TBD	TBD-TBD	71
5	(El Salvador) TBD	TBD-TBD	71

=== Top goalscorers ===
No.	Player	period	Goals
1	(Colombia) Jeison Quiñones	2017–2019	21
2	(Paraguay) Javier Lezcano	2016	17
3	(Paraguay) Gustavo Guerreño	2015–2016	16
4	(El Salvador) Kevin Sagastizado	2011–2017	14
5	(Colombia) **Neimer Miranda**	2015–2016, 2019–	11
6	(El Salvador) Isidro Gutierrez	2017	11

Note: Players in bold text are still active with Pasaquina
