= Miguel Angel Deras =

Salvadoran footballer and manager

Miguel Ángel Deras
Personal information
- Full name: Miguel Ángel Deras
- Place of birth: El Salvador
- Position: Striker

Senior career*
Years	Team	Apps	(Gls)
1937–1946	Quequeisque		
- Moctezuma de Orizaba

International career
1945	El Salvador		

Managerial career
- 1973: Lincoln F.C.
- 1978–1980: Once Lobos
- * Club domestic league appearances and goals

Miguel Ángel Deras is a Salvadoran retired footballer and manager.

== Club career ==
Nicknamed Chincuya, Deras won six league titles with Quequeisque from 1940-1946.
