= C.D. Espíritu Santo =

Salvadoran football club

Club Deportivo Espíritu Santo
- Full name: Club Deportivo Espíritu Santo
- Nickname(s): "Los Isleños"
- Founded: 1961
- Ground: Cancha Espíritu Santo; Isla el Jobal, Usulután, El Salvador
- League: ADFA Usulutan
- Apertura 2021: Grupo Oriente

Club Deportivo Espíritu Santo is a Salvadoran professional football club based at Isla el Jobal, Usulután Department, El Salvador.

The club currently plays in the ADFA Usulutan and is known as Los Isleños.

In 2012, the club won promotion to the second division for the first team in the club history after winning their championship playoff against San sebastion 2–0, the goals were scored by Oscar Muñoz (60th min) and Ramon Diaz (92 min).
