= Cándido Amador Recinos =

Cándido Amador Recinos (1958 – April 12, 1997) was a Honduran political activist and Ch'orti' indigenous leader. He was General Secretary of the General Council of Assessment for the Development of Indigenous Groups (in Spanish the Comité de Asesoramiento de las Etnias Autóctonas de Honduras) and had spent many years fighting to recover lost lands and for the legal possession of Ch'orti' lands for the Ch'orti' people. He was murdered by unknown assailants and left by the side of a road with determined as from a brain injury. Days earlier he had informed colleagues about death threats. Two men were arrested and later released without charge.
