= C.D. California =

Salvadoran football club

- Full name: Club Deportivo California
- Nickname(s): TBD
- Founded: 1980
- Ground: Polideportivo Elias Ramirez, El Salvador
- League: Tercera Division de Fútbol Salvadoreño
- Apertura 2018: TBD
Home colours

Club Deportivo California is a Salvadoran professional football club based in California, Usulutan, El Salvador.

The club currently plays in the Tercera Division de Fútbol Salvadoreño.

The club was founded in 1980.

== Current squad ==
Note: Flags indicate national team as defined under FIFA eligibility rules; some limited exceptions apply. Players may hold more than one non-FIFA nationality.

No.	Pos.	Nation	Player
—		(El Salvador) SLV	Juan Carlos Vigil
—		(El Salvador) SLV	Kristian Dominguez
—		(El Salvador) SLV	Hugo Coreas
—		(El Salvador) SLV	Duban Lopez

No.	Pos.	Nation	Player
—		(El Salvador) SLV	Benjamin Aleman
—		(El Salvador) SLV	Ever Garcia
—		(El Salvador) SLV	

== List of coaches ==
- (El Salvador) Elías Ramírez (2016)
