= C.D. Los Andes =

- Full name: Club Deportivo Los Andes de San Jorge
- Founded: 1932
- Ground: Complejo Deportivo de San Jorge
- Capacity: 8000
- Chairman: Juan Carlos Moreira
- Coach: Edgardo Chavez
- League: Tercera Division
Home colours

C.D. Los Andes is a Salvadoran professional soccer team based in San Jorge, San Miguel, El Salvador. They currently play in the Tercera Division de Fútbol Salvadoreño.

== Honours ==
=== Domestic honours ===
==== Leagues ====
- Primera División Salvadorean and predecessors
  - Champions : N/A
- Segunda División Salvadorean and predecessors
  - Champions (1) : N/A
  - Runners-up (2):
- Tercera División Salvadorean and predecessors
  - Champions (2) : 1981–82, 2005–06
  - Play-off winner (2):

== List of coaches ==
- Isaac Zelaya (2019- March 2023)
- Salvador Cuadra (April 2023- 2024)
- Eduardo Chavez (mayo 2025- presente)
