= Marcelino Imbers Stadium =

Stadium in La Unión, El Salvador

Coordinates: 13°19′59″N 87°50′46″W

Estadio Marcelino Imbers
- Interactive map of Estadio Marcelino Imbers
- Full name: Estadio Marcelino Imbers
- Location: La Unión, La Unión, El Salvador
- Owner: Municipal government
- Operator: Municipal government
- Capacity: 4,000
- Surface: Grass

Construction
- Built: 1999

Tenant
- Atlético Balboa

Marcelino Imbers Stadium (Spanish: Estadio Marcelino Imbers) is a multi-use stadium in La Unión, El Salvador. Built in 1999, it is used for football matches, and has served as the home stadium for clubs including Atlético Balboa and C.D. Pasaquina. Other events have included music festivals such as the Gulf Carnival (Carnavalón del Golfo), as well as an annual pageant to select the queen of the patron saint festivals of La Unión.

In 2008, a comparison of worldwide football ticket prices identified Marcelino Imbers Stadium as offering among the cheapest, at only 93 euro cents. In November 2025, renovation of the historic stadium began, funded by the municipality of La Unión Sur.
