= C.D. Once Lobos =

Association football club in El Salvador

- Full name: Club Deportivo Once Lobos
- Nickname: Once Lobos
- Founded: 11 February 1918; 108 years ago
- Ground: Estadio Club Deportivo Once Lobos, Chalchuapa, Santa Ana
- Capacity: 2,000
- Chairman: (El Salvador) Juan Duch Martínez
- Manager: (El Salvador) Juan Carlos Moscoso
- League: (El Salvador) Liga de Ascenso
- 2022 Apertura: Overall: 6th Playoffs: Did not qualify
Home colours	Away colours

Club Deportivo Once Lobos, commonly known as Once Lobos (the Eleven Wolves), is a professional Salvadoran football club based in Chalchuapa, Santa Ana, El Salvador.

Created in February 1918, Once Lobos are the oldest club still active in any form of the El Salvador football league system. The club currently plays in the Liga de Ascenso.

== History ==
Once Lobos was founded in 1918, in Chalchuapa. Their first match that year – long before the country had a football league or even a football federation – was against Fuerte 22, a club from nearby Santa Ana. The Club came about after the fusion of clubs Esparta and Germania. They played their first international match that same year, travelling about 60 km (37 mi) north to face a team in Jutiapa, Guatemala. Once Lobos played their first official match against UCA in 1923.

For many decades, the team played its home games at Estadio el Progreso, a pitch within earshot of the ancient Tazumal pyramid and its ballcourt from Pre-Columbian times. In December 2002, Once Lobos moved to the Estadio Cesar Hernández, in the outskirts of the city.

Once Lobos made its first ascension to the Primera División de Fútbol de El Salvador (La Primera) on February 7, 1980 at the Óscar Quiteño stadium in the neighboring city of Santa Ana, where they beat UCA in the second and decisive game. During their first full season in La Primera, struggled to fight-off relegation, made more difficult by the league's decision the previous year to relegate two teams at season's end. They finished 9th, staying ahead of Dragón and Platense, to maintain a spot in La Primera for the 1981 season.

In the 1981 Season, the Chalchuapa side won the "Torneo de Copa" by beating the League Champion Atlético Marte by penalties. At the conclusion of the regulation time, the score was tied one all (Once Lobos scorer was W. Barrera at 27‘) and nothing changed in the ensuing 30-minute overtime.

The 1982 season saw the team come under the direction of Dr. Ricardo Mena Laguán. At the end of the regular season, the teams that made it onto the final Serires were Águila, Atlético Marte, Independiente and Once Lobos. In this elimination round, Atlético Marte defeated Once Lobos 2 nil in the first leg and drawing in the second leg. Once Lobos and Águila fought for 3rd and 4th place respectively in a single game played on December 19. Once Lobos emerged victorious by penalties after the end of regulation the score read 3 all. Once Lobos capitalized on all 5 shots while Águila scored only four, thus achieving the best position for the "yuqueros" in their long history. Once Lobos did it with only 10 men on the pitch since the 81st minute in regular time, when Mario D. Campos was sent off.

In 1983 Once Lobos made it to the final round once again. Still under the direction of Ricardo Mena Laguán. Joined by Independiente, C.D. FAS and C.D. Águila fought the final in a two-round robin elimination; achieving 3rd place once again by defeating Independiente this time in the last game by a score of 2–1.

In 1987 Once Lobos were relegated to the Segunda División. After a later relegation to the third division, Once Lobos were promoted to the Segunda División in 1995. They were promoted to La Primera in 2004 through a "play-off" game victory against Chalatenango.

In 2018, Once Lobos celebrated their 100th year of existence, receiving a special recognition from the Legislative Assembly of El Salvador as the oldest football club still in existence in the nation.

On June 13, 2025 It was announced Once Lobos would be cessiding their spot in the segunda division for the Apertura 2025 to Dragon.

== Honours ==
Once Lobos's first trophy was the Copa Campeons Tourney, which they won in 1981. Their first league honour came in 1980–1981, when they won the 1980–81 Segunda División title

Once Lobos's honours include the following:

=== Domestic honours ===
==== Leagues ====
- Primera División de Fútbol de El Salvador
  - Third place (2): 1982, 1983
- Segunda División Salvadorean and predecessors
  - Champions: (3): 1980-81, 1996–97, 2014 Clausura

==== Cups ====
- Copa Champions Tourney: and predecessors
  - Champions (1): 1981

== Colours and crest ==
Home kit colours

Throughout the club's history, Once Lobos have worn blue with a yellow stripe.

== Stadium ==
- Estadio de Chalchuapa, (2002–present)
  - Estadio El Progreso, (1918–2002)
  - Estadio César Hernández, (2004–2011) games played while renovations are being done at Estadio de Chalchuapa.

The 2,000-capacity Estadio de Chalchuapa has been Once Lobos's home stadium since its creation 2002. Previously the team played at Estadio El Progreso, where they had played their home matches from 1918 until the end of the 2001 season. The stadium was located in Santa Ana. The team's headquarters are located in TBD.

In 2012, Estadio El Progreso was remodelled by INDES and Municipality of Chalchuapa for a cost of 39,000 dollars .

== Records ==
=== Club records ===
- First Match (prior to creation of a league): vs. Fuerte 22 (a club from Santa Ana), 1918
- First Match (official): vs. UCA, 1923
- Most points in La Primera: 41 points (13 win, 15 draws, 5 losses) 1986/87
- Least points in La Primera: 11 points (1 win, 8 draws, 27 losses) 1996/97

=== Individual records ===
- Record appearances (all competitions): Luis Castro, 500 from 2006 to Present
- Record appearances (Primera Division): TBD, 121 from 2018 to 2022
- Most capped player for El Salvador: 50 (0 whilst at Once Lobos), Luis Guevara Mora
- Most international caps for El Salvador while a Once Lobos player: 1, TBD
- Most goals in a season, all competitions: unknown player, 62 (1927/28) (47 in League, 15 in Cup competitions)
- Most goals in a season, La Primera: TBD, 7

=== Overall seasons table in La Primera ===
Pos.	Club	Season In La Primera	Pl.	W	D	L	GS	GA	Dif.
TBA	Once Lobos	11	310	77	108	125	340	439	-99

Last updated: 11 March 2018

== Current squad ==
As of September 2026:
Note: Flags indicate national team as defined under FIFA eligibility rules; some limited exceptions apply. Players may hold more than one non-FIFA nationality.

No.	Pos.	Nation	Player
1	GK	ESA	Fernando Martinez
3		ESA	Christian Munoz
4		ESA	Angel Santos
5		ESA	Steven Cerna
6		ESA	Ovidio Guzman
7		ESA	Christian Leiva
8		ESA	Emerson Alvarenga
9		ESA	Christopher Ortiz
11		ESA	Jose Machado
12		ESA	Luis Granados
13		ESA	Carlos Trujillo
15		ESA	Axell Martinez
16		ESA	Jefferson Alvarez

No.	Pos.	Nation	Player
17		ESA	Ivan Molina
19		ESA	Hector Velasquez
21		ESA	Ramiro Gullen
22		ESA	Marcelo
23		ESA	Carlos Noyola
24		ESA	Gendrix Castro
25	GK	ESA	Luis Escamilla
26		ESA	Brandon Hernandez
27		ESA	Juan Gil
28		ESA	Anderson Leiva
29		ESA	Jesus Martinez
30		ESA	Jeri Chicas

=== Players with dual citizenship ===
- (El Salvador) (United States) TBD

=== In ===
Note: Flags indicate national team as defined under FIFA eligibility rules; some limited exceptions apply. Players may hold more than one non-FIFA nationality.

No.	Pos.	Nation	Player
—		ESA	Ramiro Gullen (From Free Agent)
—		ESA	Luis Granados (From Free Agent)
—		ESA	Steven Cerna (From Free Agent)
—		ESA	TBD (From Free Agent)
—		ESA	(From Free Agent)
—		ESA	TBD (From Free Agent)
—		ESA	TBD (From Free Agent)
—		ESA	TBD (From Free Agent)

No.	Pos.	Nation	Player
—		ESA	TBD (From Free Agent)
—		ESA	TBD (From Free Agent)

=== Out ===
Note: Flags indicate national team as defined under FIFA eligibility rules; some limited exceptions apply. Players may hold more than one non-FIFA nationality.

No.	Pos.	Nation	Player
—		ESA	Fernando Clavel (To Dragon)
—		ESA	Franklin Gonzalez (To Espartano)
—		ESA	Luis Emilio (To Juventud Independiente)
—		ESA	Carlos Trujillo (To Juventud Independiente)
—		ESA	Manuel Castro (To Once Municipal)
—		ESA	TBD (To TBD)
—		ESA	TBD (To TBD)

No.	Pos.	Nation	Player
—		ESA	TBD (To TBD)
—		ESA	TBD (To TBD)
—		ESA	TBD (To TBD)
—		ESA	TBD (To TBD)
—		ESA	TBD (To TBD)

== Coaching staff ==
As of March 2025

Position	Staff
Manager	(El Salvador) Juan Carlos Moscoso
Assistant Manager	(El Salvador) TBD
Reserve Manager	(El Salvador) TBD
Ladies's Manager	(El Salvador) TBD
Physical coach	(El Salvador) Francisco Guinea
Assistant Physical coach	(El Salvador) TBD
Goalkeeper Coach	(El Salvador) TBD
Kineslogic	(El Salvador) TBD
Utility Equipment	(El Salvador) TBD
Football director	(El Salvador) TBD
Team Doctor	(El Salvador) TBD

== List of coaches ==
The club's current manager is the Salvadorian Cesar Acevedo. There have been TBD permanent and TBD caretaker managers of Once Lobos since the appointment of the club's first professional manager, Ranulfo Castro in 1922. The club's longest-serving manager, in terms of both length of tenure and number of games overseen, is TBD, who managed the club between 1996 and 2018. Argentinian Raul Miralles was Once Lobos's first manager from outside the El Salvador. Salvadoran Ricardo Mena Laguán helped Once Lobos reached its highest possible finish in Primera division with a 3rd place finish in 1982. Miguel Angel Deras "Chincullita", Cesar "El Piscuchita" Acevedo and Mauricio Laureano Alvarenga "Tarzan" is the club's most successful coach in terms of titles, having won one Segunda División Salvadorean title.

Name	Nat	Tenure	Achievement
Ranulfo Castro	(El Salvador)	1922–1923	
Moran Monchez	(El Salvador)	1947 – 1955	
Jose Moreira	(El Salvador)	1950s	
Julio Contreras	(El Salvador)	1961	
Raul Miralles	(Argentina)	1976	
Miguel Angel Deras "Chincullita"	(El Salvador)	1979–1980	1 Segunda División Salvadorean
Jorge Tupinambá dos Santos	(Brazil)	1981– 1982	
Ricardo Mena Laguán	(El Salvador)	1982–1983	2 x Third place Primera División de Fútbol de El Salvador
Miguel Angel Deras "Chincullita"	(El Salvador)	1984–1985	
Ricardo López Tenorio	(El Salvador)	1986	
Ruben Guevara	(El Salvador)	1992	
David Aquiles Medina	(Honduras)	1993–1994	
Marcelo Fabián Bruno <>	(Argentina)	1995	coached 5 games
Mauricio Laureano Alvarenga "Tarzan"	(El Salvador)	1996	1 Segunda División Salvadorean
Cesar "El Piscuchita" Acevedo	(El Salvador)	1997	
Nelson Mauricio Ancheta	(El Salvador)	1996–1998	
Nicolás "Nicky" Chávez	(El Salvador)	2000	
Rubén Guevara	(El Salvador)	January 2001 - 2001	
Nicolás "Nicky" Chávez	(El Salvador)	2002	
Ricardo Mena Laguán	(El Salvador)	2002 - January 2003	
Jorge Rivas	(El Salvador)	February 2003 - 2003	
Edwin Portillo	(El Salvador)	2003 – July 2004	
Carlos Recinos	(El Salvador)	August 2004 – January 2005	
Ruben Guevara	(El Salvador)	January 2005 - 2005	
Genaro Sermeño	(El Salvador)	2005 - 2005	
Roberto "Toto" Gamarra	(Argentina) (Paraguay)	April 2005–2006	
Jose Ramón Aviles	(El Salvador)	2008	
Eraldo Correia	(El Salvador) (Brazil)	2008	
Ángel Eugenio Orellana	(El Salvador)	2008–2009	
Mauricio Alvarenga	(El Salvador)	2009 -2010	
Cesar "El Piscuchita" Acevedo	(El Salvador)	2010 – June 2014	1 Segunda División Salvadorean (2014 Clausura)
Antonio García Prieto	(El Salvador)	June 2014 – November 2014	
Cesar "El Piscuchita" Acevedo	(El Salvador)	December, 2014 – May 2015	
Ivan Ruiz	(El Salvador)	June 2015 – June, 2017	
Cesar "El Piscuchita" Acevedo	(El Salvador)	July 2017 – September, 2017	
Jorge Molina	(El Salvador)	October 2017 – May 2018	
Cesar "El Piscuchita" Acevedo	(El Salvador)	May 2018 – May 2019	
Efrain Burgos	(El Salvador)	May 2019 – November 2019	
Carlos Che Martinez	(Argentina)	December 2019 – March 2022	
Enzo Enriquez	(Argentina)	March 2022 – December 2022	
Nelson Mauricio Ancheta	(El Salvador)	December 2022 – June 2023	
Cesar Acevedo	(El Salvador)	June 2023 – June 2024	
Francisco Sibrian	(El Salvador)	June 2024 – October 2024	
TBD	(El Salvador)	October 2024 – December 2024	
Juan Carlos Moscoso	(El Salvador)	January 2025 – June 2025	
Hiatus	(El Salvador)	July 2025 - July 2026	
Juan Carlos Moscoso	(El Salvador)	July 2026 – Present	

== List of notable players ==
Players with senior international caps

- (Argentina) Oscar Pianetti
- (Belize) Cesar Rosalez
- (Guatemala) Byron Pérez
- (Guatemala) Óscar Enrique Sánchez
- (Guatemala) Jorge la Chana Fernández
- (Guatemala) Erwin Donis
- (Paraguay) Néstor Ayala
- (El Salvador) Luis Guevara Mora
- (El Salvador) Jose Luis Rugamas
- (El Salvador) Efrain Burgos
- (El Salvador) Juan Ramon Martinez
- (El Salvador) Gonzalo Henriquez
- (El Salvador) Manuel de Jesús Quezada
- (El Salvador) Martin Pantoja
- (El Salvador) Giovanni Trigueros
- (El Salvador) Carlos Vargas
- (El Salvador) Raul Chamagua
- (El Salvador) Enio Mendoza
- (El Salvador) Rafael Tobar
- (El Salvador) Mario Deras
- (El Salvador) Salvador Alfaro
- (El Salvador) Julio Martinez
- (El Salvador) William Renderos
- (El Salvador) Alfredo Perez
- (El Salvador) Juan Carlos Padilla
- (El Salvador) Rene Galan
- (El Salvador) Mario Siguenza
- (El Salvador) Roberto Ochoa
- (El Salvador) David Rugamas
- (El Salvador) Jorge Cruz

=== Team captains ===
Name	Years
(El Salvador) Raul Reynaldo Rodriguez Nochez	1983
(El Salvador) Alex Flores	1989–1992
(El Salvador) Miguel Salamanca	1996
(Colombia) Jhon Polo	2013–2018
(El Salvador) Mario Gutierrez	2019
(El Salvador) Carlos Portillo Alvarenga	2019–2020
(El Salvador) Luis Castro	January 2021– July 2025
Hiatus	July 2025 - July 2026
(El Salvador) Ivan Molina	August 2026 - Present
