= San Luis Talpa =

- Municipality
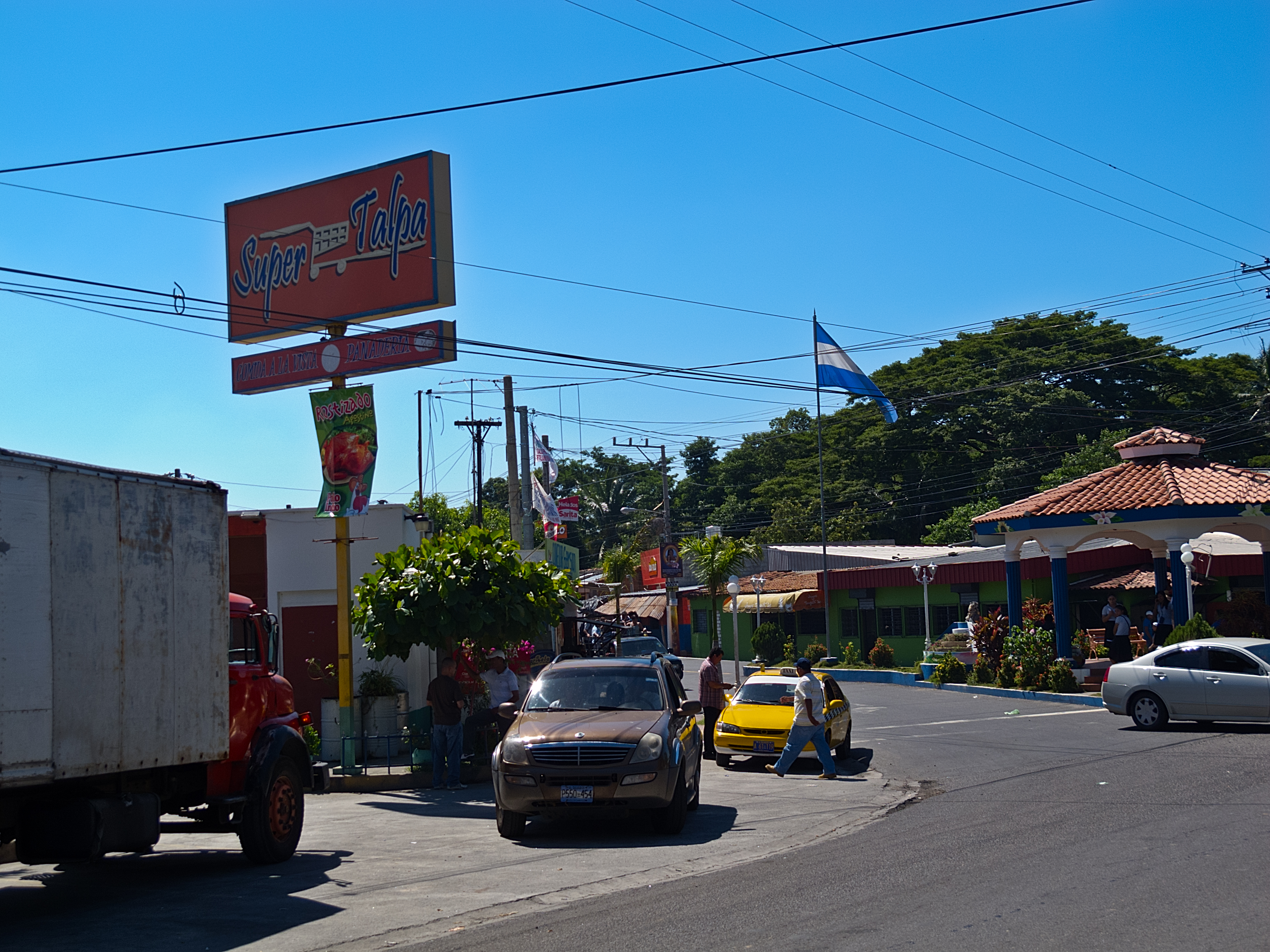

- Location in El Salvador
- Coordinates: 13°28′N 89°5′W
- Country: El Salvador
- Department: La Paz
- Elevation: 118 ft (36 m)

San Luis Talpa is a municipality in the La Paz department of El Salvador. It is close to Saint Óscar Arnulfo Romero y Galdámez International Airport, which itself is about eight kilometers from the capital, San Salvador.

== Gallery ==
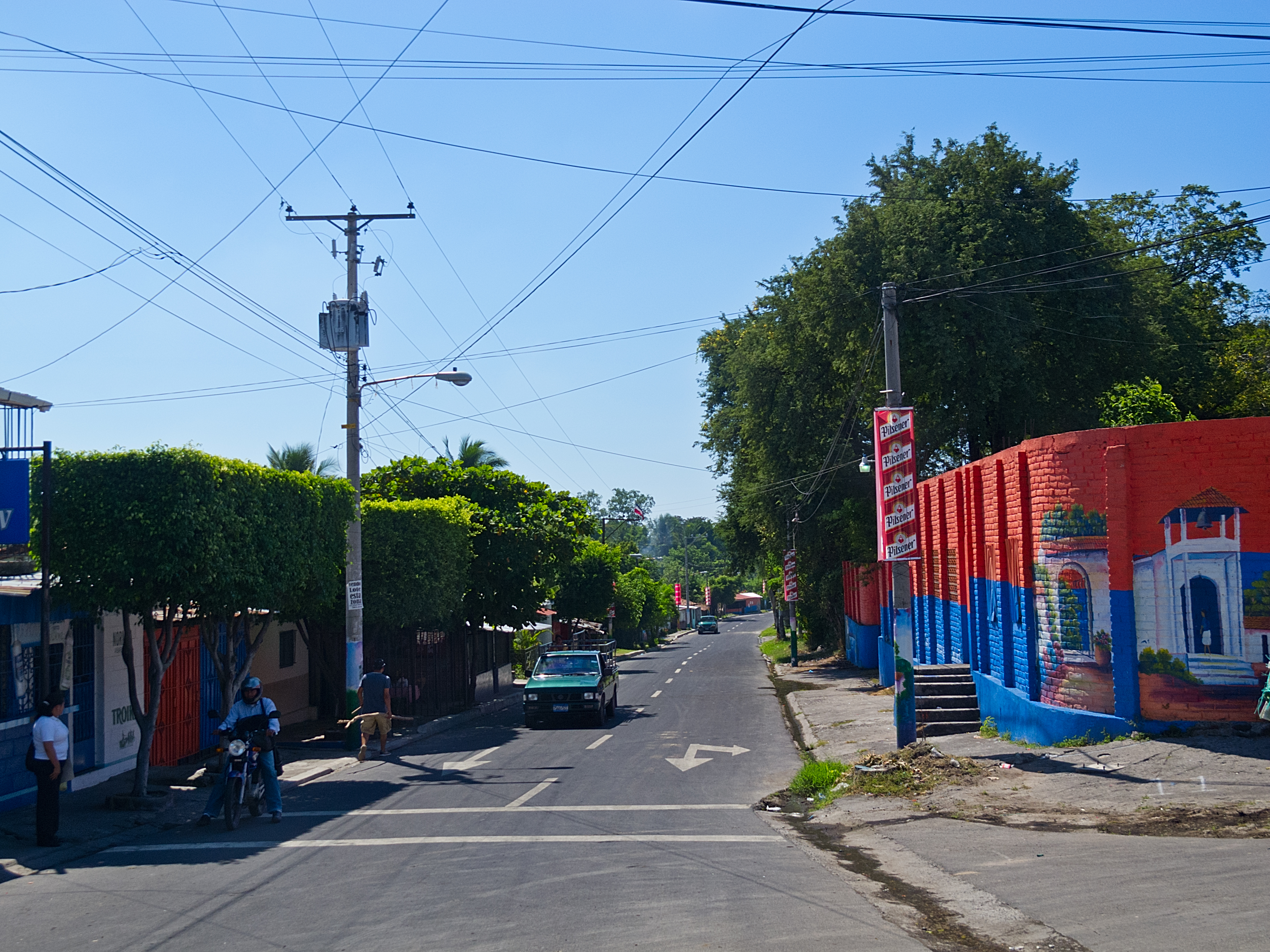
Some of the streets of San Luís Talpa

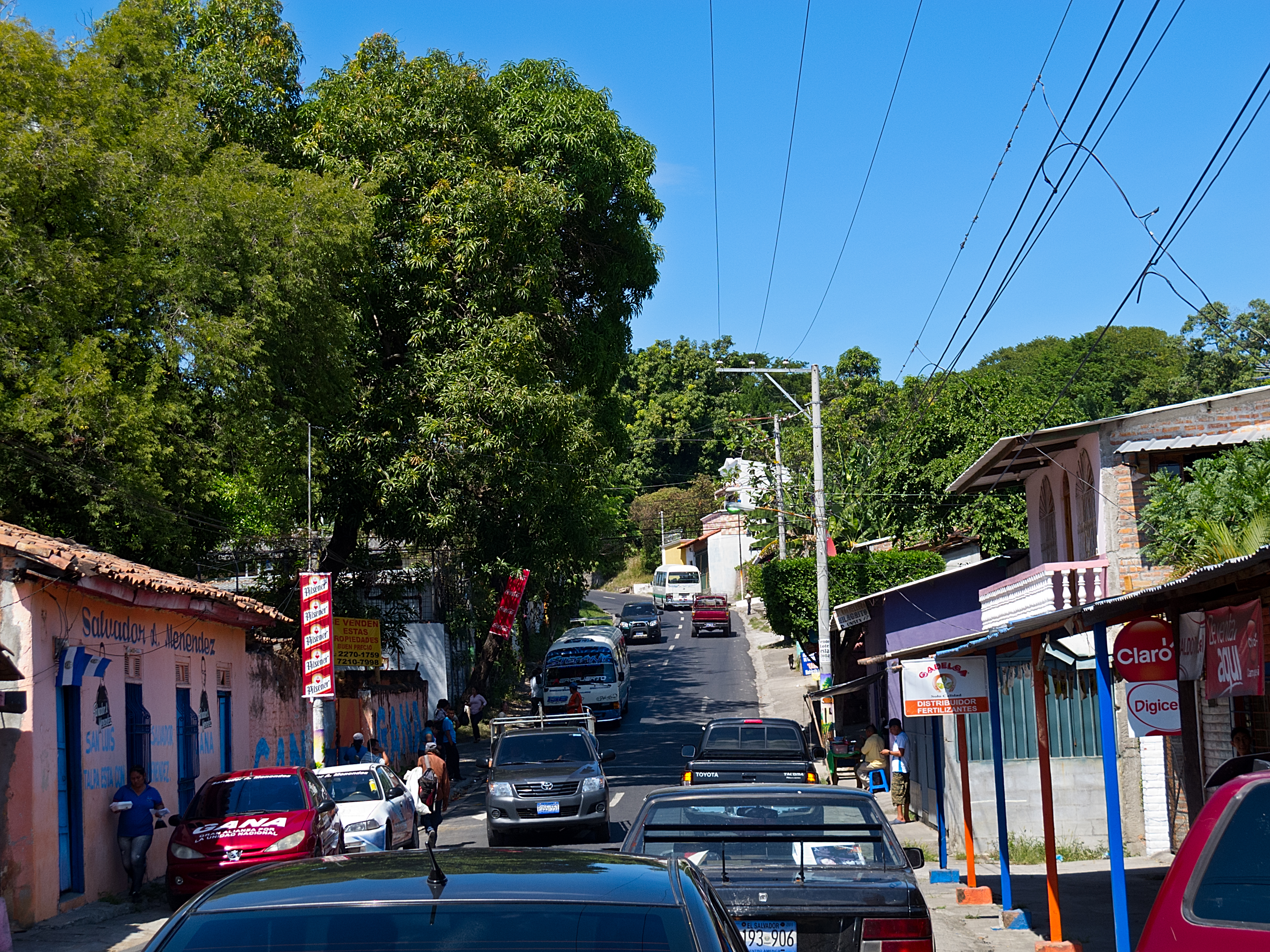
Streets of San Luís Talpa
