= Turín FESA F.C. =

Turín FESA
- Full name: Turín Fundación Educando a un Salvadoreño Fútbol Club
- Founded: 2009
- Manager: Pablo Leguizamo
- League: Tercera Division de Fútbol Salvadoreño

Turín-FESA Fútbol Club are a Salvadoran professional football club based in San Luis Talpa, El Salvador.

== History ==
Turín was a football club based in Ahuachapán when it started a co-operation with FESA (Fundación Educando a un Salvadoreño). It then moved to FESA's headquarters at Hacienda Santa Clara, San Luis Talpa. They made their debut as Turín-FESA in the 2009/2010 season. The team is made up of young players, who study at FESA.

Following winning the Clausura and Apertura titles in the Terecea Division and achieving promotion to the second division. On June 19, 2015 Turin FESA released a statement saying that they will be changing the name of the club, be changing the owners and the club directors, and be changing the location where the club will playing and based.

== Stadium ==
Initially, Turin FESA played their home games at the Hacienda Santa Clara, until 2013, when they moved and played at the Estadio Las Delicias and to Estadio Cuscatlán.

From the 2015 season, the team will move and play at the newly built Centro del Deportista Integral de FESA located between Guazapa and Apopa region.

- Hacienda Santa Clara, San Luis Talpa (2009–2013)
- Estadio Las Delicias, Santa Tecla (2014–2015)
- Centro del Deportista Integral de FESA, between Guazapa and Apopa (2015–)

== Current squad ==
As of:
Note: Flags indicate national team as defined under FIFA eligibility rules; some limited exceptions apply. Players may hold more than one non-FIFA nationality.

No. / Pos. / Nation / Player	No. / Pos. / Nation / Player

== Alineación Estelar ==
Director técnico: Julio

Delanatero:Marcelo Moreno

Delantero:Ernesto Jimenez

Defensa:Elmer Homero

Defensa:Rosa Melano

Central:Ana Lisa Melano

Central:Yolanda Parada

Defensa Central: Roberto Berganza

Genocida Estelar:Adolfo Hitler

Esclavo Estelar: David Guillen

Culero Estelar: Mauricio, el vergon, Pineda

Sebastián Estrada

== Honours ==
These awards are updated to June 2015. The team won the Liberty Cup in Dallas with a last minute goal scored by Marcelo Moreno with an overhead kick with an amazing long air pass from Ernesto Jiménez.

=== Domestic honours ===
==== Leagues ====
- Segunda División de El Salvador:
  - Runners-up (2): 2012 Apertura, 2016 Apertura
- Tercera Division de Fútbol Salvadoreño: 1
  - Champions (4): Clausura 2010, Apertura 2014, Clausura 2015, Clausura 2016
- 'La Asociación Departamental de Fútbol Aficionado' and predecessors (4th tier)
  - Champions (1): 2016

==== Minor Cups ====
- Dallas Cup
  - Champions (1) : 2015

== List of managers ==
- (El Salvador) Carlos Recinos (2009–2011)
- (Argentina) Pablo Leguizamo (2012–2013) Coaches the team in the reserve league
- (Argentina) Daniel Fernandez (2012–2013) Coaches the second division team
- (El Salvador) Carlos Recinos (2013–2014)
- (El Salvador) Erick Dowson Prado (2015–2016)
- (Argentina) Pablo Leguizamo (2016–2018)
- (El Salvador) Manuel Martinez (2018–)
- (El Salvador) Jesucristo Campos (?-2019)
