= Chalchuapa =

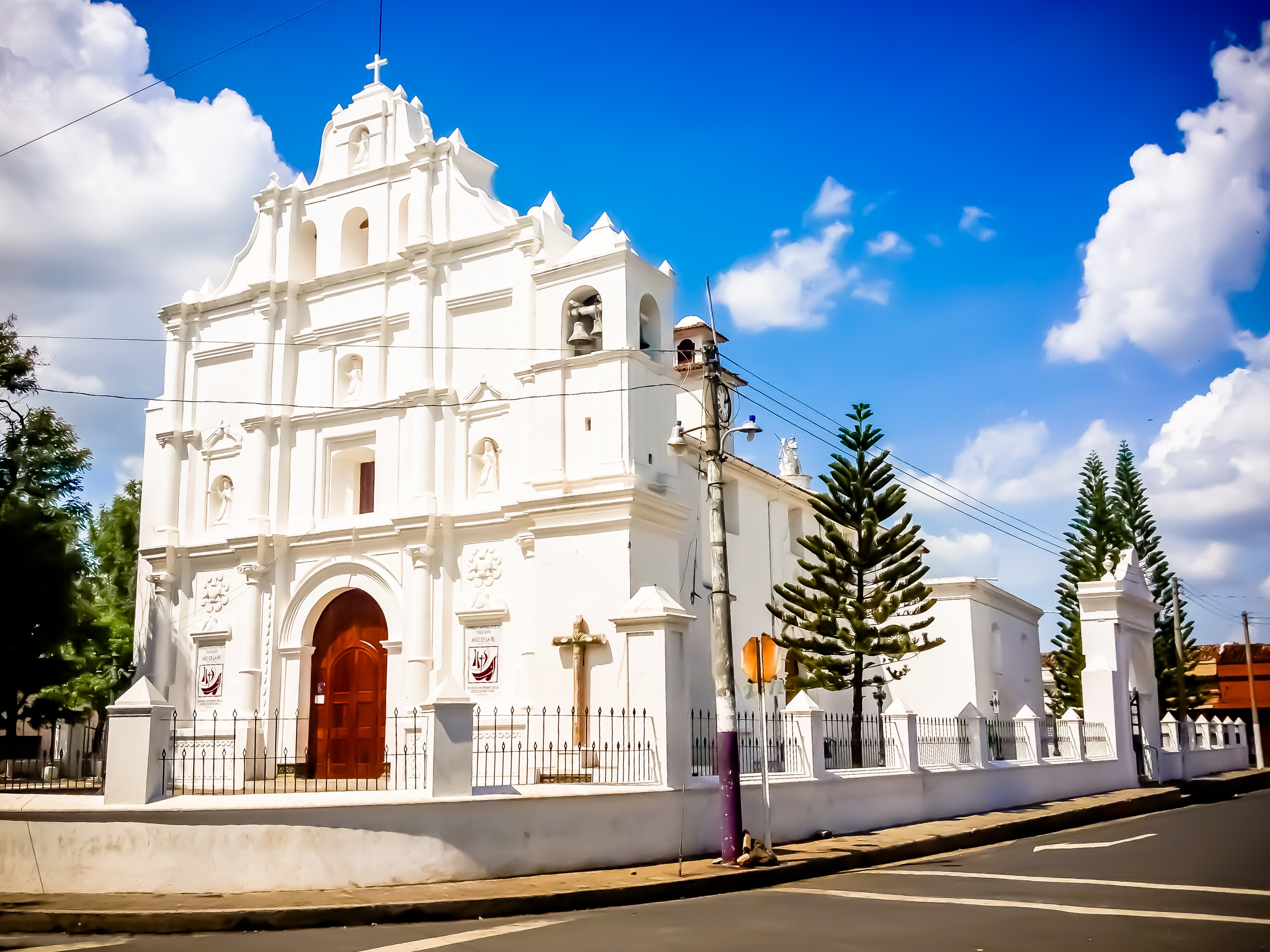

- Location in El Salvador
- Coordinates: 13°59′N 89°41′W
- Country: El Salvador
- Department: Santa Ana Department

Population (2005)
  - Total: 72,728

Chalchuapa is a town and a municipality located in the Santa Ana department of El Salvador. The city of Chalchuapa is in a wide valley at 650 meters above sea level, and watered by the Pampe River.

== Overview ==
It is situated 15 kilometers west from Santa Ana city, in the valley of Cuscachapa. The 'El Trapiche' pool is in the countryside of the city, filled with fresh and transparent waters; and the Mayan structure of Casa Blanca, which exhibits the rock on which General Justo Rufino Barrios from Guatemala was fatally wounded and murdered in the bloody battle of April 2, 1885. It also possesses an old-fashioned church of pure colonial style. It is a beautiful architectural jewel consecrated to the patron of the city of Santiago Apostol whose lyric representation on horseback crowns the dome of the Catholic Church.

Chalchuapa, which in Nahuatl means 'Jade River', was the most remarkable emporium of the civilization of the Pok'omames, one of the Maya peoples. It also constitutes some of the most important archaeological areas of the country, with five ceremonial centers: Tazumal, Pampe, Trapiche, Casa Blanca, and Las Victorias; also, Cuzcachapa Lagoon. These pre-Columbian vestiges are scattered in an area of 6 square km.

The ruins of Tazumal include a main pyramidal structure 23 meters in height (the inferior structures are still buried) located in a block and forming two truncated pyramids to the west. It has eight pilasters with chiseled figures. Northernmost, there are other complex constructions and a memorial dance ground with ladders. The 'Ball Game' field, almost totally destroyed, used to be located in the current cemetery area.

On the western flank of Ku or Teocali, there is a monolith carved in basaltic rock called "Estela de Tazumal" 2.65 meters high and 1.16 meters wide. It represents a richly adorned character, showing on the side hieroglyphical inscriptions that are possibly chronological, but different from the classical of the Mayan culture.

== Battle of Chalchuapa ==
An important battle took place in Chalchuapa on April 2, 1885. Guatemalan President Justo Rufino Barrios died during this battle.
