= Estadio Correcaminos =

Multi-use stadium in El Salvador

Coordinates: 13°41′54″N 88°06′04″W

- Desierto de Oriente
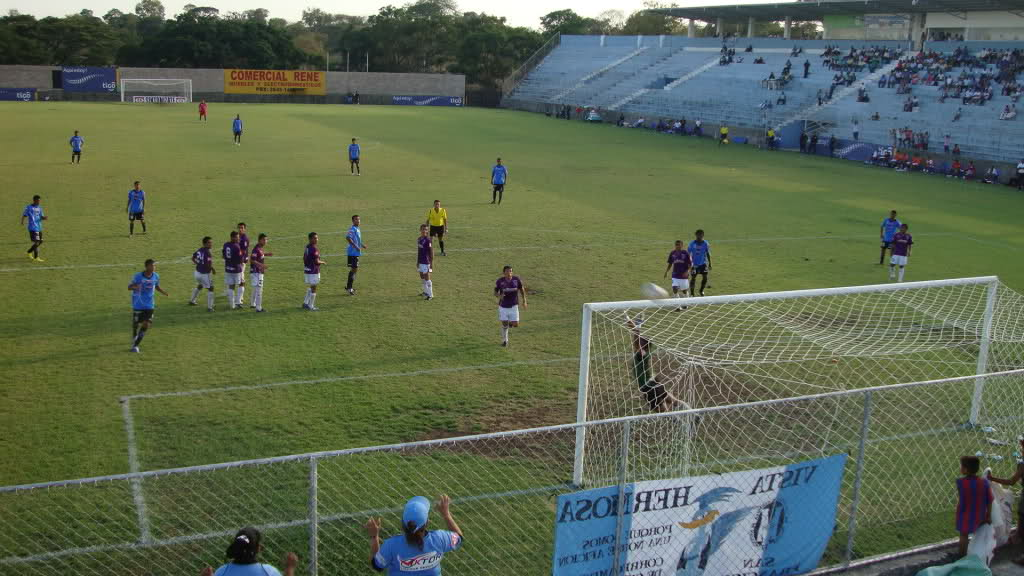
- Interactive map of Estadio Correcaminos
- Full name: Estadio Correcaminos
- Location: San Francisco Gotera, El Salvador
- Capacity: 12,000

Construction
- Built: April 5, 2009
- Cost: US$510,000

Tenants
- C.D. Vista Hermosa (2009-2012); Fuerte San Francisco (2013-); C.D. Chagüite (2017-)

Estadio Correcaminos is a multi-use stadium in San Francisco Gotera, El Salvador. It is currently used mostly for football matches and is the home stadium of Fuerte San Francisco.

It is named after the team's nickname Correcaminos. The cost of its construction was US$510,000. The stadium holds 12,000 people.
