= La Unión, El Salvador =

La Unión
- Municipality
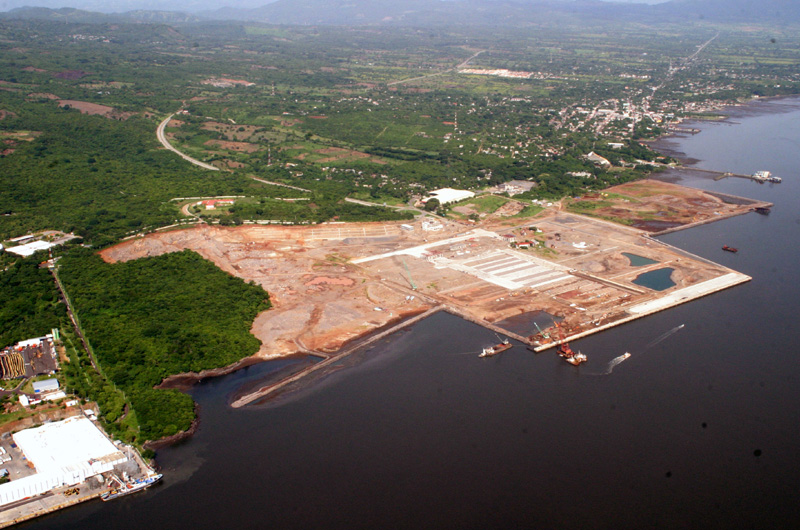
- View of the La Union Port

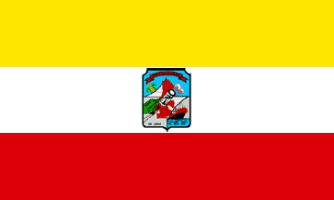
- Flag

- Location in El Salvador
- Coordinates: 13°20′13″N 87°50′38″W
- Country: El Salvador
- Department: La Unión Department
- Founded: 1865

Area
  - Municipality: 144.43 km^{2} (55.76 sq mi)
- Elevation: 5 m (16 ft)

Population (2020)
  - Municipality: 37,460
  - Density: 259.4/km^{2} (671.8/sq mi)
  - Urban: 19,854

La Unión (Spanish pronunciation: [lawˈnjon]) is a municipality in La Unión Department of El Salvador.

It is the capital city of the department of La Unión. It is the largest city in the department with a population of approximately 34,000 inhabitants. Previously known as Puerto San Carlos, it was renamed La Unión on July 13, 1824, after El Salvador gained independence from Spain and formed the United Provinces of Central America. La Unión became a department on June 22, 1865, and the city of La Unión became its capital.

In 2005 the Salvadoran government began a new port at La Unión which was to have more than double the cargo capacity of the old and exceed that of El Salvador's principal port at Acajutla. Completed in November 2012, the port has since helped increase local economic growth and stability, though competition from nearby San Miguel remains strong.

On November 20, 2021 Salvadoran President Nayib Bukele announced plans to construct a new city, dubbed "Bitcoin City", in La Unión.

== History ==
In 1522, Andrés Niño, a pilot, discovered the Golfo de Fonseca. At the end of the 18th century, what is now La Unión was categorized as a town and it was given the name in honor the King, who at the time was Charles III.

On February 28, 1854, the town, now La Unión, was granted with the title of city as "pueblo del puerto de San Carlos de la Unión." After El Salvador gained its independence, the extensive Departamento de San Miguel was created. Eventually, this overly large department was split into two: San Miguel proper, a new Department of La Unión, with its capital at the Port of La Unión.

== Agriculture ==
On the basis of agriculture, La Unión is one of the richest departments with this industry. The most important products that have been grown are: coffee, cocoa, sugar cane, oleaginous seeds, fruits, and grass.

== Tourism ==
A temple named El Templo de Conchagua was built in 1693 and it rapidly became one of La Unión's tourist attractions. The city also had archeological ruins from Intipucá and Meanguera, other departments inside of La Unión. The beaches that surround La Unión are also touristic opportunities, the beaches are: Playas del Tamarindo, Playas Negras, and Playitas.

== Government ==
The department governor resides in La Unión as the city and in all the departments inside the city, including the department of La Unión. Mayors are elected to each department in the city and the mayor has the chance to choose their aldermen and councilors. The current mayor of La Unión, El Salvador is Victoria Gutierrez making her the first female mayor of La Unión.

== Climate ==
Climate data for La Unión, El Salvador (1991–2020)
Month	Jan	Feb	Mar	Apr	May	Jun	Jul	Aug	Sep	Oct	Nov	Dec	Year
Record high °C (°F)	38.5 (101.3)	41.0 (105.8)	41.0 (105.8)	40.0 (104.0)	40.8 (105.4)	38.4 (101.1)	38.0 (100.4)	38.8 (101.8)	38.4 (101.1)	38.0 (100.4)	37.1 (98.8)	40.2 (104.4)	41.0 (105.8)
Mean daily maximum °C (°F)	34.6 (94.3)	35.2 (95.4)	35.7 (96.3)	36.0 (96.8)	34.6 (94.3)	33.8 (92.8)	34.7 (94.5)	34.7 (94.5)	33.3 (91.9)	32.9 (91.2)	33.9 (93.0)	34.4 (93.9)	34.5 (94.1)
Daily mean °C (°F)	28.0 (82.4)	28.9 (84.0)	29.6 (85.3)	30.2 (86.4)	29.1 (84.4)	28.3 (82.9)	28.6 (83.5)	28.2 (82.8)	27.3 (81.1)	27.1 (80.8)	27.4 (81.3)	27.8 (82.0)	28.4 (83.1)
Mean daily minimum °C (°F)	21.8 (71.2)	22.6 (72.7)	23.7 (74.7)	24.9 (76.8)	24.4 (75.9)	23.7 (74.7)	23.6 (74.5)	23.3 (73.9)	22.9 (73.2)	22.7 (72.9)	22.4 (72.3)	21.9 (71.4)	23.2 (73.8)
Record low °C (°F)	13.0 (55.4)	16.0 (60.8)	13.3 (55.9)	18.6 (65.5)	19.7 (67.5)	18.8 (65.8)	18.6 (65.5)	18.5 (65.3)	18.0 (64.4)	16.6 (61.9)	16.6 (61.9)	14.7 (58.5)	13.0 (55.4)
Average precipitation mm (inches)	0.8 (0.03)	1.5 (0.06)	6.2 (0.24)	30.7 (1.21)	256.1 (10.08)	272.0 (10.71)	150.0 (5.91)	236.8 (9.32)	373.2 (14.69)	288.2 (11.35)	58.2 (2.29)	4.1 (0.16)	1,677.8 (66.06)
Average relative humidity (%)	57	56	56	61	70	75	70	73	79	78	67	61	67
Source 1: Ministerio de Medio Ambiente y Recursos Naturales
Source 2: NOAA (extremes)
