= C.D. Chagüite =

Association football club in El Salvador

- Full name: Club Deportivo Chagüite
- Founded: 14 July 1975; 50 years ago
- Ground: Estadio Correcaminos, Morazan
- League: Segunda Division
Home colours	Away colours

Club Deportivo Chagüite are a Salvadoran professional football club based in gualindo centro Lolotiquillo, El Salvador.

== Honours ==
=== Domestic honours ===
- Tercera División Salvadorean and predecessors
  - Champions (1): Clausura 2017

== Current squad ==
As of: Note: Flags indicate national team as defined under FIFA eligibility rules; some limited exceptions apply. Players may hold more than one non-FIFA nationality.

No.	Pos.	Nation	Player
—		(El Salvador) SLV	Gilfredo González
—		(Uruguay) URU	Jonathan Piñero
—		(Colombia) COL	Keiner Rentería
—		(El Salvador) SLV	
—		(El Salvador) SLV	
—		(El Salvador) SLV	
—		(El Salvador) SLV	

No.	Pos.	Nation	Player
—		(El Salvador) SLV	
—		(El Salvador) SLV	
—		(El Salvador) SLV	
—		(El Salvador) SLV	
—		(El Salvador) SLV	
—		(El Salvador) SLV	

== List of coaches ==
Name	Nat	Tenure
Ciro Emigdio Romero	El Salvador	July, 2013 – October, 2017
Efrain Nunez	Honduras	October, 2017 – February, 2018
Nelson Ancheta	El Salvador	February, 2018 – June, 2018
Carlos Asprilla	Colombia	June 2018 – September 2018
Fidel Lazo	El Salvador	September 2018 – October 2018
Jorge Calles	El Salvador	October 2018 – December 2018
Victor Coreas	El Salvador	January 2019 – February 2019
Nelson Ancheta	El Salvador	February, 2019–
