= 2019–20 Segunda División de Fútbol Salvadoreño =

Second division football in El Salvador

Segunda División de Fútbol Salvadoreño
- Season: 2019–20
- Champions: Apertura: Platense, Clausura: Ciub Deportivo Dragon
- Promoted: None
- Relegated: None

The 2019–20 season (officially known as Liga de Plata and also as Torneo Luis Baltazar Ramírez) will be El Salvador's Segunda División de Fútbol Salvadoreño. The season will be split into two championships Apertura 2019 and Clausura 2020. The champions of the Apertura and Clausura play the direct promotion playoff every year. The winner of that series ascends to Primera División de Fútbol de El Salvador.

On 13 March 2020, the FESFUT suspended Primera and Segunda division indefinitely following the outbreak of coronavirus in El Salvador.[5] On 28 April 2020, it was announced that Primera and Segunda campaigns would not resume, after the country banned all sporting events until September.[6] On 30 April 2020, No champions were crowned following the cancellation of the 2019–20 season and it would be no club promoted or relegated.

== Changes from the 2019–20 seasons ==
Teams promoted to 2019–20 Primera División de El Salvador

- El Vencedor

Teams relegated to Segunda División de Fútbol Salvadoreño - Apertura 2019

- Firpo

Teams relegated to Tercera Division de Fútbol Salvadoreño - Apertura 2019

- No teams relegated

Teams promoted from Tercera Division De Fútbol Profesional - Apertura 2019

- Turin
- C.D. Cacahuatique

New Teams or teams that purchased a spot in the Segunda division

- C.D. Titán (bought one of two spots available for $TBD)
- C.D. Topiltzin ( bought one of two spots available for $TBD)
- Marte Soyapango (bought spot of Chaguite for $TBD)
- AD Juayúa (bought spot of Turin FESA for $TBD)
- Gerardo Barrios (Best Third division team promoted in place of recently relegated Luis Angel Firpo)

Teams that failed to register for the Apertura 2019

- C.D. Chagüite (sold their spot to Marte Soyapango)
- Firpo (Failed to meet the requirements and therefore were relegated)
- Turin (sold their spot to Juayúa)

=== Notable death from Apertura 2019 season and 2020 Clausura season ===
The following people associated with the Segunda Division have died in Middle of 2019 and mid 2020.

- Jaime Rafael Mina (San Pablo) [ ]
- * Victor Emmanuel Rodriguez (ex Fuerte Aguilares player)

== Stadiums and locations ==
Club	City	Stadium	Capacity
Aspirante	Jucuapa, Usulután	Estadio Municipal Jucuapa	
Atletico Marte	San Salvador, San Salvador	Estadio Cuscatlan	
Brujos de Izalco	Izalco, Sonsonate	Estadio Salvador Mariona	
Cacahuatique	Ciudad Barrios, San Miguel	Cancha Centro Ecologico El Amaton	
Dragon	San Miguel, San Miguel	Estadio Juan Francisco Barraza	
Fuerte San Francisco	San Francisco Gotera, Morazán	Estadio Correcaminos	
Gerardo Barrios	El Transito	Estadio Cesar Antonio Angulo	
Ilopaneco	Ilopango, San Salvador	Estadio Azteca	
Juayua	Sonsonate, Sonsonate	Estadio Municipal de Juayua	
Liberal	Quelepa, San Miguel	Estadio Municipal de Quelepa	
Marte Soyapango	Soyapango, San Salvador	Cancha Jorgito Meléndez	
Once Lobos	Chalchuapa, Santa Ana	Estadio Once Lobos	
Platense	Zacatecoluca, La Paz	Estadio Panoramico Antonio Toledo Valle	10,000
Rácing Jr	Armenia, Sonsonate	Estadio 21 de Noviembre	
San Pablo Tacachico	San Pablo Tacachico, La Libertad	Cancha Municipal Valle Mesa	
Santa Rosa Guachipilin	Santa Rosa Guachipilín, Santa Ana	Estadio José Hernández	
Titán	Texistepeque, Santa Ana	Estadio Municipal Titan	
Topiltzín	Jiquilisco, Usulután	Estadio Topiltzín	
UDET	El Transito, Usulután	Estadio cesar Angulo	
Vendaval	Apopa, San Salvador	Estadio Joaquín Gutiérrez.	

=== Personnel and kits ===
Team	Chairman	Head coach	Captain	Kit manufacturer	Shirt sponsor(s)
Aspirante	(El Salvador) TBD	(El Salvador) Willian Chevez	(El Salvador) TBD	Sportfine	Caja de Credito Jucuapa, Clinicas Medicas Roosevelt
Atletico Marte	(El Salvador) Hugo Carrillo	(El Salvador) Mauricio Alfaro	(El Salvador) Diego Hunter	Tony Sports	Tony Sports
Brujos de Izalco	(El Salvador) Oscar David Linares	(El Salvador) Marcos Escalante	(El Salvador) Julio Riviera	None	SALNET, Alcadía Municipal de Izalco
Cacahuatique	(El Salvador) TBD	(El Salvador) Omar Sevilla	(El Salvador) TBD	TBD	TBD
Dragon	(El Salvador) TBD	(Colombia) Henry Vanegas	(El Salvador) TBD	Rush	Pez Dorado Hotel, FCI
Fuerte San Francisco	(El Salvador) Salvador Funes	(El Salvador) Nelson Alvarenga	(El Salvador) TBD	Innova Sport	GOTUS, Las Perlitas, Caja de Credito SanFrancisco Gotera, Trenda Dianta, Mascarela
Deportivo Gerardo Barrios	(El Salvador) Luis Alonso Vasquez	(El Salvador) Efrain Solano	(El Salvador) TBD	Innova Sports	Farmacia La Bueno, Las Perlitas, Pornefro
Ilopaneco	(El Salvador) Adan Perdomo	(El Salvador) Victor Manuel Pacheco	(El Salvador) Edwin Morataya		COSAVI, Pedagigica, Gold
AD Juayúa	(El Salvador) Hernan Lopez	(El Salvador) Enio Mendoza	(El Salvador) Argenis Capacho	Rush	Bufete, Credicampo, Sistema Fedicredito
Liberal	(El Salvador) TBD	(El Salvador) Abel Blanco	(El Salvador) TBD	Jorge Sport	Alcadia Municipal de Quelepa
Marte Soyapango	(El Salvador) Arquitecto Oswaldo Villalta	(El Salvador) William Osorio	(El Salvador) Erick Molina	Arijam Sports	Bomba, Red5G
Once Lobos	TBD	(El Salvador) Efrain Burgos	(El Salvador) Carlos Portillo	None	Zona Franca 10 Chalchuapa, Alcadia Municipal de Chalchuapa, Fundecredito de R.L.
Platense	(El Salvador) TBD	(El Salvador) Jorge Abrego	(El Salvador) Wilmer Novoa	Nil	Caja de Credito Zacatecoluca, Comite Los Angeles, Rosy Romero, D'Kche,
Rácing Jr	(El Salvador) TBD	(El Salvador) Efren Marenco	(El Salvador) Danny Torres	TBD	Alcadia Municipal de Armenia, Caja de Credito Armenia
San Pablo Tacachico	(El Salvador) Mario Castillo	(El Salvador) Oscar Ulloa 'Largato'	(El Salvador) Rosemberg Cueva	Galaxia	Pepe, Construction Lingo, Funerales celesti
Santa Rosa Guachipilin	(El Salvador) TBD	(Argentina) Carlos Martinez che	(El Salvador) TBD	Matute Sport	Omnivision Canal 29, Ferreteria Difersa
Titan	(El Salvador) William Garcia	(El Salvador) José Antonio Prieto	(El Salvador) Jorge Borjas	Joma	Nicky Sports, AGROAmigo
Topiltzin	(El Salvador) Rodrigo Salomon Montoya	(El Salvador) Sebastian Hernandez	(El Salvador) TBD	TBD	Kiquilisoc Centro
UDET	(El Salvador) Ruben Guerrero	(Honduras) Efrain Nunez	(El Salvador) Ramon Enrique Quintanilla	Kelme	Ginerra
Vendaval	(El Salvador) Juan Marin	(El Salvador) Christian Lopez	(El Salvador) Kevin Barahona	Kelme	RIA

== Managerial changes ==
Team	Outgoing manager	Manner of departure	Date of vacancy	Replaced by	Date of appointment	Position in table
Pre-Apertura changes
Once Lobos	(El Salvador) Cesar Acevedo	End of contract	2019	(El Salvador) Efrain Burgos	2019	Preseason
Vendaval	(El Salvador) Osmin Orellana	End of contract	2019	(El Salvador) Christian Lopez	2019	Preseason
Cacahuatique	(El Salvador) TBD	End of contract	2019	(El Salvador) Omar Sevilla	2019	Preseason
Atletico Marte	(El Salvador) Ricardo Guevara	End of contract	2019	(El Salvador) Mauricio Alfaro	2019	Preseason
San Pablo Tacachico	(El Salvador) Juan Ramon Sanchez	Resigned to be manager of Chalatenango	July 2019	(El Salvador) Oscar 'Lagarto' Ulloa	July 2019	Preseason
Aspirante	(El Salvador) José Mario Martínez	Contract finished	July 2019	(El Salvador) Willian Chevez	July 2019	Preseason
UDET	(El Salvador) TBD	End of contract	2019	(Honduras) Efrain Nunez	2019	Preseason
Gerardo Barrios	(El Salvador) TBD	End of contract	2019	(El Salvador) Efrain Solano	2019	Preseason
Fuerte San Francisco	(El Salvador) Marvin Hernandez	End of contract	2019	(El Salvador) Nelson Alvarenga	2019	Preseason
Brujos de Izalco	(Uruguay) Ruben Alonso	End of contract	2019	(El Salvador) Marcelo Escalante	2019	Preseason
Apertura changes
Brujos Mario Calvo	(El Salvador) Marcelo Escalante	Sacked	September 2019	(El Salvador) Manuel Melgar	September 2019	Group A. 10th
Atletico Marte	(El Salvador) Mauricio Alfaro	Sacked	Sept 2019	(El Salvador) Jorge Calles	October 2019	Group A. 10th
Cacahuatique	(El Salvador) Omar Sevilla	Resigned to become head coach of Independiente	October 2019	(Brazil) Eraldo Correia	October 2019	Group B. 8th
Fuerte San Francisco	(El Salvador) Nelson Alvarenga	Sacked	2019	(El Salvador) Dagoberto Sosa	October 2019	Group B. 9th
Liberal	(El Salvador) Abel Blanco	Sacked	October 2019	(El Salvador) Nelson Mauricio Ancheta	October 2019	Group A. 10th
Racing Jr	(El Salvador) Efren Marenco	due to personal issues	October 2019	(El Salvador) Wilber Aguilar	October 2019	Group A. 1st
UDET	(Honduras) Efrain Nunez	Sacked	October 2019	(El Salvador) Isidro Soriano	October 2019	Group B. 10th
Vendaval	(El Salvador) Cristian Lopez	Sacked	October 2019	(El Salvador) Barrón Álvarez Interimship	October 2019	Group A. 10th
Vendaval	(El Salvador) Barrón Álvarez	Interimship finished	October 2019	(Argentina) Gabriel Alvarez	October 2019	Group A. 10th
Titán	(El Salvador) Antonio Garcia Prieto	Resigned	October 2019	(El Salvador) Edgar Batres	October 2019	Group A, 4th
Atletico Marte	(El Salvador) Jorge Calles	Interimship finished	October 2019	(Chile) Juan Carlo Carreno	October 2019	Group A. 8th
C.D. Dragon	(Colombia) Henry Vanegas	Sacked	November 2019	(El Salvador) José Mario Martínez	November 2019	Group b. 5th
Pre-Clausura changes
Once Lobos	(El Salvador) Efrain Burgos	End of contract	November 2019	(Argentina) Carlos Che Martinez	December 2019	Preseason
Santa Rosa Guachipilín	(Argentina) Carlos Che Martinez	End of contract	December 2019	(El Salvador) Samuel Maldonado	December 2019	Preseason
San Pablo Tacachico	(El Salvador) Oscar 'Lagarto' Ulloa	End of contract	December 2019	(Colombia) Henry Vanegas	December 2019	Preseason
Gerardo Barrios	(El Salvador) Efrain Solano	End of contract	December 2019	(El Salvador) Ervin Loza	December 2019	Preseason
Aspirante	(El Salvador) Willian Chevez	End of contract	December 2019	(El Salvador) Sebastian Hernandez Sigaran	January 2020	Preseason
Topiltzin	(El Salvador) Sebastian Hernandez Sigaran	End of contract	December 2019	(Colombia) Efrain Solano	January 2020	Preseason
Ilopaneco	(El Salvador) Victor Manuel Pacheco	End of contract	January 2020	(El Salvador) Lazaro Gutierrez	January 2020	Preseason
Liberal	(El Salvador) Nelson Mauricio Ancheta	Resigned, became coach of El Vencedor	January 2020	(El Salvador) Denis Moreno	January 2020	Preseason
Clausura changes
Cacahuatique	(Brazil) Eraldo Correia	Sacked	February 2020	(El Salvador) Marvin Javier Hernandez	February 2020	Group B, 6th
Marte Soyapango	(El Salvador) William Osorio	Sacked	February 2020	(El Salvador) Juan Ramon Paredes	March 2020	th
Vendaval	(El Salvador) Osmin Orellana	Sacked	February 2020	(Honduras) German Perez	February 2020	th
Aspirante	(El Salvador) Sebastian Hernandez Sigaran	Sacked	February 2020	(El Salvador) Carlos Martinez	February 2020	th
Ilopaneco	(El Salvador) Lazaro Gutierrez	Sacked	March 2020	(El Salvador) Fredy Santos (Interim)	March 2020	th
Topiltzin	(Colombia) Efraín Solano	Sacked	March 2020	(El Salvador) Jorge Calles	March 2020	th
AD Juayúa	(El Salvador) Ennio Mendoza	Sacked	March 2020	(Uruguay) Ruben Alonso	March 2020	th
Platense	(El Salvador) Jorge Abrego	Mutual Consent	March 2020	(El Salvador) Guillermo Rivera	March 2020	1st

== Apertura 2019 ==
=== Foreign players ===
Club	Foreign Player 1	Foreign Player 2
AD Juayapa	(Argentina) Matias Coluca	(Colombia) Carlos Salazar
Atletico Marte	(Colombia) Juan Manuel Charry	(Colombia) Juan Manuel Charry
Aspirante	(Colombia) Yohanny Fary Mancilla x	(Honduras) Osmar
Brujos de Izalco	(Colombia) Lucas Diaz x	(Colombia) Mayer Gil Hurtado x
Cacahuatique	(Colombia) Brayan Bermudez Mazo	(Colombia) Jose Luis Sanabria
Dragon	(Honduras) Brayan Zuniga x	(Brazil) Josielson Moraes Silva x
Fuerte San Francisco	Nil	Nil
Gerarado Barrios	(Colombia) Victor Contreras	Nil
Ilopaneco	(Colombia) Edier Tello x	(Colombia) Anderson Herrera x
Liberal	(Honduras) Gregory Costly x	(Colombia) Andrés Vallecilla x
Once Lobos	(Colombia) Cristian Caicedo X	(Colombia) Breiner Giovanny Ortíz X
Platense	(Colombia) Wilber Arizala x	(Colombia) Christian Gil Hurtado x
Rácing Jr	(Brazil) Jackson de Oliveira	(Brazil) Igor Dos Santo
Marte Soyapango	(Colombia) Jhon Machado	Nil
San Pablo Tacachico	(Colombia) Daniel García x	Nil
Santa Rosa Guachipilin	(Colombia) Luis Sanchez	Nil
Titan	Nil	Nil
Topiltzin	(Colombia) Luis Palacios x	Nil
UDET	Nil	Nil
Vendaval	(Colombia) Luis Castillo	(Colombia) Wilian Guerrero

=== Conference standings ===
==== Group A ====
Pos	Team	Pld	W	D	L	GF	GA	GD	Pts	Qualification
1	Juayua (Q)	18	9	5	4	23	18	+5	32	Qualified to the Final Round
2	Rácing Jr (Q)	18	8	7	3	35	33	+2	31	Qualified to the Final Round
3	Brujos de Izalco (Q)	18	8	5	5	39	31	+8	29	Qualified to the Final Round
4	San Pablo Tacachico (Q)	18	8	3	7	25	22	+3	27	Qualified to the Final Round
5	Once Lobos	18	7	4	7	31	25	+6	25	
6	A.D. Santa Rosa Guachipilin	18	5	7	6	34	38	−4	22	
7	Ilopaneco	18	5	7	6	25	31	−6	22	
8	Atletico Marte	18	6	2	10	35	36	−1	20	
9	Titan	18	5	5	8	25	27	−2	20	
10	Vendaval	18	4	5	9	17	28	−11	17	

Updated to match(es) played on 2018. Source:
Rules for classification: 1) points; 2) goal difference; 3) number of goals scored.
(Q) Qualified for the phase indicated

==== Group B ====
Pos	Team	Pld	W	D	L	GF	GA	GD	Pts	Qualification
1	Liberal (Q)	18	10	6	2	34	22	+12	36	Qualified to the Final Round
2	Platense (Q)	18	9	7	2	36	12	+24	34	Qualified to the Final Round
3	Dragon (Q)	18	8	6	4	24	23	+1	30	Qualified to the Final Round
4	Gerardo Barrios (Q)	18	7	8	3	20	10	+10	29	Qualified to the Final Round
5	Topiltzin	18	7	7	4	30	20	+10	28	
6	Marte Soyapango (E)	18	6	6	6	23	26	−3	24	
7	Aspirante (E)	18	5	5	8	31	33	−2	20	
8	Fuerte San Francisco (E)	18	4	6	8	24	31	−7	18	
9	Cacahuatique (E)	18	3	7	8	17	25	−8	16	
10	UDET (E)	18	0	4	14	6	39	−33	4	

Updated to match(es) played on 2018. Source:
Rules for classification: 1) points; 2) goal difference; 3) number of goals scored.
(E) Eliminated; (Q) Qualified for the phase indicated

=== Season statistics ===
==== Top scorers ====
Rank	Player	Club	Goals
1	(Colombia) Cristian Gil Hurtado	Platense	19
2	(Colombia) Cristian Eduardo Caicedo	Once Lobos	15
3	(Brazil) Igor Do Santos	Racing Jr	13
4	(El Salvador) Eduardo Aldair Merino	Atletico Marte	12
5	(El Salvador) Carlos Alfredo Flores	AD Santa Rosa Guachipilín	11
6	(El Salvador) Brayan Alexander Ortega	Titan	11
7	(El Salvador) Carlos Alexander Zamora	AD Santa Rosa Guachipilín	10
8	(El Salvador) Julio Cesar Rivera	Brujos de Izalco	10
9	(El Salvador) Gregory Alexander Blyden	Liberal	10
10	(El Salvador) Elmer Armando Ibañez	AD Juayúa	9
11	(El Salvador) Aquiles Eliseo Méndez	Racing Jr	9

==== Hat-tricks ====
Player	For	Against	Result	Date
(Colombia) Cristian Caicedo	Once Lobos	Racing jr	5-1 (H)	15 September 2019
(El Salvador) Alexander Morales	UDET	Liberal	3–3 (H)	29 September 2019
(Colombia) Cristian Gil	Platense	Marte Soyapango	6–0 (H)	23 October 2019
(Colombia) Cristian Caicedo	Once Lobos	Titan	4-3 (A)	23 October 2019
(Colombia) Luis Palacios	Topiltzin	Dragon	4-1 (A)	24 October 2019
(El Salvador) Eduardo Merinoa	Atletico Marte	Santa Rosa	4-2 (H)	3 November 2019

=== Quarterfinals ===
November 23, 2019
3:00pm

Gerardo Barrios	1-2	Juayua
Manfredi Sosa 22'		Cesar Rivera 35'; Marvin Durango 78'

Estadio Cesar Antonio Ángulo, El Tránsito, San Miguel
December 2, 2019

Juayua	0-0	Gerardo Barrios
Nil	[ ]	Nil

Estadio Cuscatlan

A.D. Juayua won 2-1 on aggregate.

November 24, 2019
2:30 pm

San Pablo	1-1	Platense
Isai Aguilar 53'		Christian Gil 89'

Cancha Municipal Valle Meza, San Pablo Tacachico, La Libetard
December 2, 2019
3:00 pm

Platense	1-0	San Pablo
José Molina 45'	[ ]	Nil

Estadio Antonio Toledo Valle

Platense won 2-1 on aggregate.

November 24, 2019
3:00pm

Brujos de Izalco	0-0	Liberal
Nil		Nil

Estadio Salvador Mariona, Izalco, Sonsonate
November 30, 2019
2:30 pm

Liberal	1-3	Brujos de Izalco
Gregory Costly 40'		Mayer Gil 70' 65' 70'

Estadio Municipal de Quelapa

Brujos de Izalco won 3-1 on aggregate.

November 24, 2019
3:00 pm

Dragon	1-2	Racing Jr
Bryan Zuniga 41'		Rodolfo Huezo 61'; Igor dos Santos 75'

Estadio Juan Francisco Barraza, San Miguel
December 2, 2019
2:30pm

Racing Jr	1-1	Dragon
TBD 88'		Bryan Zuniga 88'

Estadio 21 de Noviembre, Armenia, Sonsonate
Referee: Joel Aguilar Chicas

Racing Jr won 3-2 on aggregate.

=== Semifinals ===
December 8, 2019
3:00pm

Brujos de Izalco	0-0	Rácing Jr
Nil		Nil

Estadio Salvador Mariona Izalco, Sonsonate
December 2, 2018
3:00pm

Rácing Jr	1-0	Brujos de Izalco
Diego Martinez 115'		Nil

Estadio 21 de Noviembre, Armenia, Sonsonate

Racing Jr won 1-0 on aggregate.

December 8, 2019
3:15pm

Platense	0-0	Juayua
Nil		Nil

Estadio Antonio Toledo Valle, Zacatecoluca
December 9, 2019

Juayua	0-1	Platense
Nil		Jose Molina own 62'

Estadio Jose Millan Morales
Attendance: 775

Platense won 1-0 on aggregate.

=== Final ===
==== First leg ====
21 December 2019
3:00pm

Rácing Jr	1-1	Platense
Igor Do Santos 49'		Manuel Otero 73'

Estadio 21 de noviembre, Armenia, Sonsonate
Attendance: 1,455

==== Second leg ====
29 December 2019
2:30

Platense	3-2 (a.e.t.)	Rácing Jr
Jose Antonio Ruiz Maravilla 17'; Edgar Valladares 40'		Igora Do Santos 30'; Aquiles Mendez 70'

Estadio Antonio Toledo Valle, Zacatecoluca
Attendance: 3,104
Referee: Joel Aguilar Chicas

Platense won 4-3 on aggregate.

Apertura 2019 champions

2nd title

=== Individual awards ===
Hombre GOL	Best Goalkeeper Award
(Colombia) Cristian Gil; Platense	(El Salvador) Herberth Ramos; Platense

== Clausura 2020 ==
=== Teams ===
Team	City	Stadium	Head coach	Captain
Atletico Marte	TBD	Estadio Cuscutlan	(Chile) Juan Carlo Carreno	(El Salvador)
Aspirante	TBD	Estadio Municipal de Jucuapa, Usulutan	(El Salvador) Sebastian Hernandez Sigaran	(El Salvador)
Brujos de Izalco	TBD	Estadio Salvador Mariona, Izalco, Sonsonate	(El Salvador) Manuel Melgar	(El Salvador)
Cacahuatique	TBD	Centro Ecológico el Amaton, Ciudad Barrios	(Brazil) Eraldo Correia	(El Salvador)
Dragon	TBD	Estadio Juan Francisco Barraza, San Miguel	(El Salvador) Jose Mario Martinez	(El Salvador)
Fuerte San Francisco	TBD	Estadio Corrrecaminos, Fuerte San Francisco, Morazon	(El Salvador) José Dagoberto Sosa	(El Salvador)
Gerardo Barrios	TBD	Cancha Los Andes San Jorge, San Miguel	(El Salvador) Ervin Loza	(El Salvador)
Ilopaneco	TBD	Estadio Azteca, Ilopango	(El Salvador) Lazaro Gutierrez	(El Salvador)
Juyua	TBD	Estadio Municipal Juayua/José Millán Morales, Sonsinate	(El Salvador) Ennio Mendoza	(El Salvador)
Liberal	TBD	Estadio Municipal de Quelapa, San Miguel	(El Salvador) Nelson Mauricio Ancheta	(El Salvador)
Once Lobos	TBD	Estadio Once Lobos, Chalchuapa	(Argentina) Carlos Che Martinez	(El Salvador)
Platense	TBD	Polideportivo Tecoluca, San Vincente	(El Salvador) Jorge Abrego	(El Salvador)
Rácing Jr	TBD	Estadio 21 de Noviembre, Armenia, Sonsinate	(El Salvador) Wilber Aguilar	(El Salvador)
Marte Soyapango	TBD	Cancha Jorgito Melendez, Soyapango	(El Salvador) William Osorio	(El Salvador)
San Pablo Tacachico	TBD	Cancha Municipal Valle de Meza, San Pablo Tacachico	(Colombia) Henry Vanegas	(El Salvador)
Santa Rosa Guachipilin	TBD	Estadio José Hernández, Santa Rosa Guachiplin	(El Salvador) Samuel Maldonaldo	(El Salvador)
Titan	TBD	Estadio Titán, Texistepeque	(El Salvador) Edgar Batres	(El Salvador)
Topiltzin	TBD	Estadio Topiltzin de Jiquilisco, Usulutan	(Colombia) Efrain Solano	(El Salvador)
UDET	N/A	N/A	(El Salvador) N/A	(El Salvador) N/A
Vendaval	TBD	Estadio Joaquín Gutiérrez, Apopa	(El Salvador) Osmin Orellana	(El Salvador)

=== Foreign players ===
Club	Foreign Player 1	Foreign Player 2
AD Juayapa	(Colombia) Edgar Medrano x	(Brazil) Jackson de Oliveira x
Atletico Marte	(Colombia) Wilian Guerrero x	(Colombia) Orlando Alba x
Aspirante	(Colombia) Marcó Tulio Gallego x	(Colombia) Daniel Andres Castrillon x
Brujos de Izalco	(Colombia) Lucas Diaz x	(Colombia) Jefferson Viveros x
Cacahuatique	(Colombia) Brayan Bermudez x	(Colombia) Jose Luis Sanabria x
Dragon	(Brazil) Josielson Moraes Silva x	(Honduras) Bryan Zuninga x
Fuerte San Francisco	(Colombia) Jefferson Palacios x	(Colombia) Jerson Tobar X
Gerarado Barrios	(Honduras) Andres Ortiz X	
Ilopaneco	(Colombia) Edier Tello X	(Colombia) Camilo Gomez x
Liberal	(Honduras) Gregory Costly X	(Colombia) Diomer Hinestroza X
Once Lobos	(Colombia) Breiner Ortiz x	(Argentina) Gaston Rios x
Platense	(Colombia) Wilber Arizala X	(Colombia) Juan Camilo Delgado x
Rácing Jr	(Brazil) Igor do Santos X	(Colombia) Brayan Obregon x
Marte Soyapango	(Colombia)	(Colombia)
San Pablo Tacachico	(Colombia) Luis Manuel Palacios x	(Colombia) Juan Camilo Carabali x
Santa Rosa Guachipilin	(Colombia) Andres Salinas x	Nil
Titan	(Colombia) Juan Daniel Sinisterra x	(Colombia) Dylan Hurtado X
Topiltzin	(Colombia) TBD	(Colombia) Victor Alejandro Contreras x
UDET (Not Registered this year)	De-Registered	De-Registered
Vendaval	(Colombia) Alexis Dabuisson x	(Colombia) V Mosquera x

=== Conference standings ===
==== Group A ====
Pos	Team	Pld	W	D	L	GF	GA	GD	Pts	Qualification
1	Brujos de Izalco	0	0	0	0	0	0	0	0	Qualified to the Final Round
2	Rácing Jr	0	0	0	0	0	0	0	0	Qualified to the Final Round
3	San Pablo Tacachico	0	0	0	0	0	0	0	0	Qualified to the Final Round
4	A.D. Santa Rosa Guachipilin	0	0	0	0	0	0	0	0	Qualified to the Final Round
5	Once Lobos	0	0	0	0	0	0	0	0	
6	Vendaval	0	0	0	0	0	0	0	0	
7	Ilopaneco	0	0	0	0	0	0	0	0	
8	Atletico Marte	0	0	0	0	0	0	0	0	
9	Titan	0	0	0	0	0	0	0	0	
10	Juayua	0	0	0	0	0	0	0	0	

Updated to match(es) played on 2018. Source:
Rules for classification: 1) points; 2) goal difference; 3) number of goals scored.

==== Group B ====
Pos	Team	Pld	W	D	L	GF	GA	GD	Pts	Qualification
1	Platense	0	0	0	0	0	0	0	0	Qualified to the Final Round
2	Cacahuatique	0	0	0	0	0	0	0	0	Qualified to the Final Round
3	Dragon	0	0	0	0	0	0	0	0	Qualified to the Final Round
4	Fuerte San Francisco	0	0	0	0	0	0	0	0	Qualified to the Final Round
5	Liberal	0	0	0	0	0	0	0	0	
6	Gerardo Barrios	0	0	0	0	0	0	0	0	
7	Marte Soyapango	0	0	0	0	0	0	0	0	
8	Aspirante	0	0	0	0	0	0	0	0	
9	Topiltzin	0	0	0	0	0	0	0	0	
10	UDET	0	0	0	0	0	0	0	0	

Updated to match(es) played on 2018. Source:
Rules for classification: 1) points; 2) goal difference; 3) number of goals scored.

=== Season statistics ===
==== Top scorers ====
Rank	Player	Club	Goals
1	(Colombia) TBD	TBD	
2	(Colombia) TBD	TBD	
3	(El Salvador) TBD	TBD	
4	(El Salvador) TBD	TBD	
5	(El Salvador) TBD	TBD	
6	(El Salvador) TBD	TBD	
7	(El Salvador) TBD	TBD	
8	(El Salvador) TBD	TBD	
9	(El Salvador) TBD	TBD	
10	(El Salvador) TBD	TBD	

=== Finals ===
The final round of matches and the final were cancelled due to the Coronavirus pandemic. No champion was awarded for the Clausura season and Platense who won the Apertura 2019 season would play Jocoro FC in a promotion-relegation match. Qrf-Final Ida/Verta

Sem-Finals IDA/Verta

Final
