= 2020–21 Segunda División de Fútbol Salvadoreño =

Segunda División de Fútbol Salvadoreño
- Season: 2020–21
- Champions: Apertura: Platense, Clausura: AD Destroyer
- Promoted: Platense
- Relegated: TBD and TBD

The 2020–21 season (officially known as Liga de Plata and also as Torneo Luis Baltazar Ramírez) will be El Salvador's Segunda División de Fútbol Salvadoreño. The season will be split into two championships Apertura 2020 and Clausura 2021. The champions of the Apertura and Clausura play the direct promotion playoff every year. The winner of that series ascends to Primera División de Fútbol de El Salvador.

== Changes to the 2020–21 seasons ==
Due to the Pandemic, several teams opted out to participate this season, with only 14 teams available to compete

Teams promoted to 2020–21 Primera División de El Salvador

- No teams promoted

Teams relegated to Segunda División de Fútbol Salvadoreño - Apertura 2019

- No teams relegated

Teams relegated to Tercera Division de Fútbol Salvadoreño - Apertura 2019

- No teams relegated

Teams promoted from Tercera Division De Fútbol Profesional - Apertura 2019

- No teams promoted

New Teams or teams that purchased a spot in the Segunda division

- El Vencedor (Traded their spot with Atletico Marte)
- A.D. Destroyer (Purchased spot of Brujos de Izalco)

Teams that failed to register for the Apertura 2020

- Atletico Marte (bought the spot of El Vencedor in the Primera division.
- Brujos de Izalco (sold their spot to AD Destroyer)
- Once Lobos (Opted to no Participate due to COVID-19 Pandemic)
- Racing Junior (Opted to no Participate due to COVID-19 Pandemic)
- Topilzin (Opted to no Participate due to COVID-19 Pandemic)
- El Vencedor (Opted to no Participate due to COVID-19 Pandemic)
- Gerardo Barrios (Opted to no Participate due to COVID-19 Pandemic)

== Managerial changes ==
Team	Outgoing manager	Manner of departure	Date of vacancy	Replaced by	Date of appointment	Position in table
Pre-Apertura changes
Sonsonate	(El Salvador) TBD	Mutual Consent	2020	(El Salvador) TBD	2020	Preseason
Apertura changes
C.D. Liberal	(El Salvador) Nelson Mauricio Ancheta	Mutual Consent	October 2020	(El Salvador) Esteban Melara	October 2020	Group th
C.D. Vendaval Apopa	(El Salvador) Byron Alvarez	Sacked	November 2020	(El Salvador) Luis Ernesto Moisa	November 2020	Th
C.D. Marte Soyapango	(El Salvador) Rudy Cecilios	Sacked	November 2020	(El Salvador) Edson Flores	November 2020	Th
Pre-Clausura changes
Aspirante	(El Salvador) Jorge Calles	End of contract	January 2021	(Argentina) Carlos Martinez	January 2021	Preseason
C.D. Vendaval Apopa	(El Salvador) Luis Ernesto Moisa	End of contract	January 2021	(El Salvador) Alonzo Aguilar	January 2021	Preseason
Ilopaneco	(El Salvador) Ricardo Garcia	End of contract	February 2021	(El Salvador) Jorge Abrego	February 2021	Preseason
C.D. Dragon	(El Salvador) Juan Carlos Marjano	End of contract	February 2021	(El Salvador) Mártir Paredes	February 2021	Preseason
Clausura changes
C.D. Vendaval Apopa	(El Salvador) Alonzo Aguilar	Sacked	March 2021	(El Salvador) Angel Orellana	March 2021	1st
C.D. Cacahuatique	(El Salvador) Marvin Hernandez	Mutual Consent	April 2021	(Colombia) Efrain Solano	April 2021	1st
Municipal FC	(Uruguay) Ruben Alonso	Sacked	2021	(El Salvador) Ennio Mendoza	2021	th
San Palo	(El Salvador) Wilber Aguilar	Sacked	2021	(El Salvador) Rafael Mariona	2021	th

== Apertura ==
=== Teams ===
Only 14 teams chose to Participate in this season Competition

Team	City	Stadium	Head coach	Captain	Foreign Players
Aspirante	Jucuapa	Estadio Municipal de Jucuapa	(El Salvador) Jorge Calles	(El Salvador) N/A	
AD Destroyer	Puerto de La Libertad	Cancha Chilama	(El Salvador) Juan Ramon Paredes	(El Salvador) N/A	(Colombia) Jefferson Viveros; Edgar Medrano
Cacahuatique	Ciudad Barrios, San Miguel	Complejo Deportivo Chapeltique	(El Salvador) Marvin Hernandez	(El Salvador) N/A	(Colombia) Fary Mancilla
Dragón	San Miguel	Estadio Jose Eliseo Reyes	(El Salvador) Juan Carlos Marjano	(El Salvador) N/A	
Fuerte San Francisco	San Francisco Gotera, Morazan	Estadio Joe Amilcar Moreno	(El Salvador) Omar Sevilla	(El Salvador) N/A	
Ilopaneco	TBD	Estadio Joaquin Gutierrez Apopa	(El Salvador) Ricardo Garcia	(El Salvador) N/A	(Colombia) Camilo Gomez
Juayua (Municipal FC)	Nahuizalco, Sonsonate	Estadio Municipal Flor Blanco, Sonsonate	(Uruguay) Ruben Alonso	(El Salvador) N/A	
Liberal	Quelapa, San Miguel	Estadio Municipal de Quelapa	(El Salvador) Nelson Mauricio Ancheta	(El Salvador) N/A	(Honduras) Gregory Costly
Marte Soyapango	Soyapango	Cancha Jorgito Melendez	(El Salvador) Rudy Cedillos	(El Salvador) N/A	(Colombia) Jhony Moran Chan (Colombia) William Gurero
Platense	Zacatecoluca	Complejo Deportivo en Tecoluca/ EstadioTopilitzin de Jiquilisco	(El Salvador) Guillermo Rivera	(El Salvador) N/A	(Colombia) Juan Camilo Delgado
San Pablo Municipal	San Pabo Tacahico	Cancha Municipal Valle Meza	(El Salvador) Wilber Aguilar	(El Salvador) N/A	(Colombia) Bryan Obregon
AD Santa Rosa Guachipilín	Santa Rosa Guachipilín, Santa Ana	Estadio Jose Hernandez	(El Salvador) Samuel Maldonado	(El Salvador) N/A	(Colombia) Héctor Lemus
Titan	Texistepeque, Santa Ana	Estadio Titan	(El Salvador) Edgar Batres	(El Salvador) N/A	(Colombia) Breiner Ortiz
Vendaval	Apopa	Estadio Joaquin Gutierrez	(El Salvador) Byron Alvarez	(El Salvador) N/A	

=== Finals ===
==== Quarter-finals ====
===== First leg =====
January 4, 2021

Titan	2-3	A.D. Destroyer
Breiner Ortiz 66'; 68' (pen.)		Reynaldo Carpio 23'; Denis Garcia 68'; TBD 68'

January 4, 2021

Marte Soyapango	2-1	San Pablo Municipal
José Mauricio Rodríguez; Douglas Moises Rivas		TBD 23'

January 4, 2021

Aspirante	0-1	Platense
nil		Camilio Delgado 67' (pen.)

January, 2021

Fuerte San Francisco	1-0	Cacahuatique
Carlos Trejo 68'		nil

===== Second leg =====
January 11, 2021

A.D. Destroyer	1-1	Titan
Cristian Martínez 30'		Julio Borjas 23'

A.D. Destroyer won 4-3 on Aggregate.

January 11, 2021

San Pablo Municipal	2-1	Marte Soyapango
Oscar Alexander Ulloa 26' (pen.); Kevin Ernesto Belasquez 68'		Douglas Moises Ramirez 23'

Marte Soyapango tied 3-3 on Aggregate, won penalties

January 11, 2021

Platense	0-0	Aspirante
‘’’Nil‘’’		‘’’Nil‘’’

Estadio Sergio Torrez, Usulutan

Platense won 1-0 on Aggregate.

January, 2021

Cacahuatique	2-0	Fuerte San Francisco
Francisco Valladares; Juan Carlos Argueta		‘’’Nil‘’’

Cacahuatique won 2-1 on Aggregate.

==== Semi-finals ====
===== First leg =====
January 17, 2021
3:00pm

Cacahuatique	1-2	Platense
Cristin Martínez 26'		Steve Alfaro 49'; Juan Camilo Delgado 65'

Cancha Centro Ecológico, El Amaton

January 17, 2021

Marte Soyapango	3-1	A.D. Destroyer
TBD 26' (pen.); TBD 68'; TBD 68'		TBD 23'

Cancha Jorgito Meléndez

===== Second leg =====
January 25, 2021

Platense	1-1	Cacahuatique
José Antonio Maravilla 80'		Hugo Hernández 6'

Estadio Cuscatlan, San Salvador
Attendance: 3,000

Platense won 3-2 on Aggregate.

January 25, 2021

A.D. Destroyer	3-1	Marte Soyapango
Denis García; Rosemberg Cuevas; Jefferson Viveros		Johnathan Alexander Pineda

Cancha Chilama, Puerto de La Libertard

AD Destroyer tied 4-4 on aggregate, won on penalties.

==== Final ====
January 30, 2021
14:30pm

Platense	2-2	A.D. Destroyer
Wilber Arizala 15'; Camilo Delgado 70'		Jonathan Nolasco 39'; Jefferson Viveros 73'
Penalties
Camilo Delgado (penalty scored); TBD (penalty missed); Wilber Arizala (penalty scored); Ruiz (penalty scored); Aguilar (penalty scored); Brayan Martinez (penalty scored)	5-4	TBD (penalty scored); TBD (penalty missed); TBD (penalty scored); TBD (penalty scored); TBD (penalty scored); TBD (penalty missed)

Estadio Cuscatlan, San Salvador

Platense won 5-4 on Penalties.

Apertura 2020 champions
Platense
3rd title

=== Individual awards ===
Hombre GOL	Best Goalkeeper Award
(Colombia) Johnny Moran; Marte Soyapango	(El Salvador) Johnathan Valle; Platense

== Clausura ==
=== Teams ===
Only 14 teams chose to Participate in this season Competition

Team	City	Stadium	Head coach	Captain	Foreign Players
Aspirante	Jucuapa	Estadio Municipal de Jucuapa	(Argentina) Carlos Martinez	(El Salvador) TBD	(Nigeria) George Martin Ankamah (Colombia) José Bautista Balanta
AD Destroyer	Puerto de La Libertad	Cancha Chilama	(El Salvador) Juan Ramon Paredes	(El Salvador) N/A	(Colombia) Jefferson Viveros; TBD
Cacahuatique	Ciudad Barrios, San Miguel	Complejo Deportivo Chapeltique	(El Salvador) Marvin Hernandez	(El Salvador) N/A	(Colombia) Cristian Gómez (Colombia) Fernando Landazuri
Dragón	San Miguel	Estadio Jose Eliseo Reyes	(El Salvador) Mártir Paredes	(El Salvador) N/A	
Fuerte San Francisco	San Francisco Gotera, Morazan	Estadio Joe Amilcar Moreno	(El Salvador) Omar Sevilla	(El Salvador) N/A	
Ilopaneco	TBD	Estadio Joaquin Gutierrez Apopa	(El Salvador) Jorge Abrego	(El Salvador) N/A	(Colombia) Camilo Gomez (Colombia) Sebastián Ortiz
Juayua (Municipal FC)	Nahuizalco, Sonsonate	Estadio Municipal Flor Blanco, Sonsonate	(Uruguay) Ruben Alonso	(El Salvador) N/A	(Colombia) Carlos Mario Palacios (Colombia) Héctor Lemus
Liberal	Quelapa, San Miguel	Estadio Municipal de Quelapa	(El Salvador)	(El Salvador) N/A	(Honduras) Gregory Costly
Marte Soyapango	Soyapango	Cancha Jorgito Melendez	(El Salvador) Rudy Cedillos	(El Salvador) N/A	(Colombia) TBD (Colombia) William Gurero
Platense	Zacatecoluca	Complejo Deportivo en Tecoluca/ EstadioTopilitzin de Jiquilisco	(El Salvador) Guillermo Rivera	(El Salvador) N/A	(Colombia) Juan Camilo Delgado
San Pablo Municipal	San Pabo Tacahico	Cancha Municipal Valle Meza	(El Salvador) Wilber Aguilar	(El Salvador) N/A	(Colombia) Bryan Obregon
AD Santa Rosa Guachipilín	Santa Rosa Guachipilín, Santa Ana	Estadio Jose Hernandez	(El Salvador) Samuel Maldonado	(El Salvador) N/A	(Colombia)
Titan	Texistepeque, Santa Ana	Estadio Titan	(El Salvador) Edgar Batres	(El Salvador) N/A	(Colombia) Breiner Ortiz (Colombia) José Medrano
Vendaval	Apopa	Estadio Joaquin Gutierrez	(El Salvador) Alonzo Aguilar	(El Salvador) N/A	

=== Regular-seasons ===
==== Group A ====
Pos	Team	Pld	W	D	L	GF	GA	GD	Pts	Qualification or relegation
1	Titan	12	7	1	4	21	16	+5	22	Advance to Playoffs
2	Real Destroyer	12	7	1	4	19	15	+4	22	Advance to Playoffs
3	Marte Soyapango	12	6	2	4	17	13	+4	20	Advance to Playoffs
4	San Pablo Tacachico	12	5	4	3	23	20	+3	19	Advance to Playoffs
5	Municipal F.C.	12	5	2	5	20	16	+4	17	
6	A.D. Santa Rosa	12	4	0	8	16	23	−7	12	
7	Vendaval	12	2	2	8	15	28	−13	8	

Rules for classification: 1) points; 2) goal difference; 3) number of goals scored.

==== Group B ====
Pos	Team	Pld	W	D	L	GF	GA	GD	Pts	Qualification or relegation
1	Platense	12	7	5	0	18	6	+12	26	Advance to Playoffs
2	Aspirante	12	5	4	3	14	13	+1	19	Advance to Playoffs
3	Fuerte San Francisco	12	4	5	3	13	11	+2	17	Advance to Playoffs
4	Liberal	12	5	2	5	20	19	+1	17	Advance to Playoffs
5	Cacahuatique	12	4	3	5	24	17	+7	15	
6	Dragon	12	2	5	5	19	21	−2	11	
7	Ilopaneco	12	2	2	8	8	29	−21	8	

Rules for classification: 1) points; 2) goal difference; 3) number of goals scored.

=== Finals ===
==== Quarter-finals ====
===== First leg =====
May 15, 2021
15:00

Marte Soyapango	0-0	A.D. Destroyer
Nil		Nil

Cancha Jorgito Melendez, Soyapango

May 16, 2021
15:00

San Pablo Municipal	3-0	Titan
Murillo; David Escobar; Francisco Posada		Nil

Cancha Municipal Valle Meza, San Pablo Tacachico, La Libertad

May 16, 2021

Fuerte San Francisco	1-1	Aspirante
TBD 67' (pen.)		TBD 67' (pen.)

Estadio Luis Amilcar Moreno, San Francisco Gotera, Morazan

May 16, 2021

Liberal	1-2	Platense
TBD 68'		Luis Ascencio; Camilo Delgado

Estadio Municipal de Quelapa, Quelapa, San Miguel

===== Second leg =====
May 23, 2021
15:00

A.D. Destroyer	3-1	Marte Soyapango
Jonathan Nolasco; Jefferson Viveros; Reynaldo Ivan Carpio		Eduardo Cruz

Cancha Jorgito Melendez, Soyapango

A.D. Destroyer won 3-1 on Aggregate.

May 23, 2021
15:00

Titan	1-0	San Pablo Municipal
Herbert Morales		Nil

Cancha Municipal Valle Meza, San Pablo Tacachico, La Libertad

San Pablo won 3-1 on Aggregate.

May 23, 2021

Aspirante	1-1	Fuerte San Francisco
William Enrique Reyes 67' (pen.)		Rudy Batrez

Estadio Luis Amilcar Moreno, San Francisco Gotera, Morazan

2-2. Fuerte San Francisco won 7-6 on penalties.

May 23, 2021

Platense	1-1	Liberal
Isai Aguilar		Manfredy Sosa

Estadio Antonio Toledo Valle, Zacatecoluca

Platense won 3-2 on Aggregate.

==== Semi-finals ====
===== First leg =====
May 30, 2021
3:00pm

Fuerte San Francisco	1-0	Platense
Alexander Marquez 91'		Nil

Cancha Centro Ecológico, El Amaton

January 17, 2021

San Pablo Municipal	0-0	A.D. Destroyer
Nil		Nil

===== Second leg =====
June 8, 2021

Platense	2-0	Fuerte San Francisco
Juan Camilo Delgado; Steve Alfaro		Nil

Platense won 2-1 on Aggregate.

June 2021

A.D. Destroyer	3-1	San Pablo Municipal
Jonathan Nolasco; Reynaldo Ivan Carpio		Johnathan Alexander Pineda

Cancha Chilama, Puerto de La Libertard

AD Destroyer tied 3-1 won on aggregate.

==== Final ====
June 13, 2021
14:30pm

Platense	3-3	A.D. Destroyer
Camilo Delgado; Rafael Burgos; Kelvin Hernandez	[ ]	Cristian Caicedo; Michael Lopez
Penalties
TBD (penalty scored); TBD (penalty missed); TBD (penalty scored); TBD (penalty scored); TBD (penalty missed)	3-4	TBD (penalty scored); TBD (penalty scored); TBD (penalty missed); TBD (penalty scored); TBD (penalty scored)

Estadio Cuscatlan, San Salvador

AD Destroyer won 5-4 on Penalties.

Clausura 2021 champions
A.D. Destroyer
2nd title
