= Antonio Toledo =

Antonio Toledo may refer to:

- Antonio Toledo (football manager)
- Antonio Toledo (footballer) (1912–2003), Salvadoran footballer
  - Estadio Antonio Toledo Valle, Salvadoran stadium named after the footballer
- Antonio Toledo Corro (1919–2012), Mexican politician
- Antônio Toledo Filho (born 1953), Brazilian rower
