= 1974–75 Primera División de El Salvador =

Primera División de Fútbol Profesional
- Season: 1974–75
- Champions: Platense (1st Title)
- Relegated: Sonsonate

The 1974–75 Primera División de Fútbol Profesional season was the 23rd tournament of El Salvador's Primera División since its establishment of the National League system in 1948. The tournament began on 17 March 1974 and finished on 29 December 1974. Platense secured the club's first Primera División title after defeating Negocios Internacionales in a three-game series; they became the second club to win the first division in their very first appearance

== Team information ==
=== Personnel and sponsoring ===
Team	Chairman	Head coach	Captain	Kitmaker	Shirt sponsor
Águila	(El Salvador) TBD	(El Salvador) Juan Francisco Barraza	(El Salvador) TBD	TBD	TBD
Alianza	(El Salvador) TBD	(Chile) Néstor Valdez Moraga	(El Salvador) Salvador Mariona	Nil	Nil
Atlético Marte	(El Salvador) TBD	(El Salvador) Isaías Choto	(El Salvador) TBD	TBD	TBD
FAS	(El Salvador) TBD	(El Salvador) Max “Katan” Cubas & Mauricio Mora	(El Salvador) TBD	Nil	Nil
Luis Angel Firpo	(El Salvador) TBD	(Brazil) Jorge Tupinambá	(El Salvador) TBD	TBD	TBD
Municipal Limeno	(El Salvador) TBD	(El Salvador) Luis “Chispo” Santana	(El Salvador) TBD	TBD	TBD
Negocios Internacionales	(El Salvador) TBD	(Argentina) Gregorio Bundio	(El Salvador) TBD	TBD	TBD
Platense	(El Salvador) TBD	(Argentina) Juan Quarterone	(El Salvador) Edgar Cabrera	TBD	TBD
Sonsonate	(El Salvador) TBD	(El Salvador) Mario “Tiorra” Castro	(El Salvador) TBD	TBD	TBD
Universidad	(El Salvador) TBD	(El Salvador) Mauricio Pipo Rodriguez	(El Salvador) TBD	TBD	TBD

== Notable events ==
=== NEIN purchased spot of Juventud Olimpica ===
On 2 March 1974, the directors of Juventud Olimpica sold their spot in the first division to C.D. Negocios Internacionels.

=== Notable death from January 1974 season and January 1975 season ===
The following people associated with the Primera Division have died between the middle of 2022 and middle of 2023.

- Vidal Coreas Merino (current Platense player, died due to car accident)

== Managerial changes ==
=== Before the season ===
Team	Outgoing manager	Manner of departure	Date of vacancy	Replaced by	Date of appointment	Position in table
Platense	(Brazil) Jorge Tupinambá	Mutual Consent	January 1974	(Argentina) Juan Quarterone	February 1974	
LA Firpo	(El Salvador) Luis ‘Chispo’ Santana	Resigned	February 1974	(Brazil) Jorge Tupinambá	March 13, 1974	

=== During the season ===
Team	Outgoing manager	Manner of departure	Date of vacancy	Replaced by	Date of appointment	Position in table
Aguila	(El Salvador) Juan Francisco Barraza	Resigned	1974	(Chile) Hernán Carrasco Vivanco	1974	
FAS	(El Salvador) Max Katan Cubas	Sacked	1974	(Chile) Carlos Javier Mascaró	1974	
LA Firpo	(Brazil) Jorge Tupinambá	Sacked	1974	(El Salvador) Marcelo Estrada	1974	
Sonsonate	(El Salvador) Mario “Tiorra” Castro	Sacked	1974	(Brazil) Jorge Tupinambá	1974	
LA Firpo	(El Salvador) Marcelo Estrada	Sacked	1974	(El Salvador) Fermin Aguilar	December 1974	

== League standings ==
Pos	Team	Pld	W	D	L	GF	GA	GD	Pts	Qualification or relegation
1	Alianza F.C.	36	18	12	6	66	37	+29	48	Champion
2	C.D. Aguila	36	16	11	9	53	44	+9	43	
3	Once Municipal	36	12	16	8	56	40	+16	40	
4	Atletico Marte	36	15	10	11	62	49	+13	40	
5	C.D. FAS	36	14	10	12	63	55	+8	38	
6	UES	36	12	14	10	52	48	+4	38	
7	Juventud Olimpico	36	11	12	13	43	47	−4	34	
8	ADLER	36	12	7	17	55	58	−3	31	
9	Sonsonate	26	10	0	16	51	66	−15	20	
10	Atlante San Alejo	36	7	4	25	38	95	−57	18	Relegated to the Liga B

Updated to match(es) played on 2022. Source: (in Spanish)
Rules for classification: 1) points; 2) goal difference; 3) number of goals scored.

== Playoffs ==
=== Semifinals 1st leg ===
December 11, 1974

Negocios Internacionales	1-0	Atletico Marte
Mario Hugo Méndez 73'		Nil

Estadio Nacional Flor Blanca

December 15, 1974

Platense	3-1	FAS
Rafael Búcaro 8'; Jaime Castro 22'; Óscar Armando Payés 26'		David Cabrera penalty

Estadio Nacional Flor Blanca

=== Semifinals 2nd leg ===
December 15, 1974

Atlético Marte	1-0	Negocios Internacionales
Sergio Méndez 33'		Nil

Estadio Nacional Flor Blanca
December 16, 1974

Negocios Internacionales	2-1	Atlético Marte
Roberto Fernández 63' 104'		Francisco Zaldaña 83'

Estadio Nacional Flor Blanca

December 15, 1974

FAS	1-1	Platense
Velásquez 43'		Norberto Zafanella 37'

Estadio Nacional Flor Blanca

=== 3rd place match ===
December 19, 1974

FAS	0-0 (won by penalties)	Atlético Marte
TBD 44'		TBD 119'

Estadio Nacional Flor Blanca

=== Final ===
December 19, 1974

Platense	2-0	Negocios Internacionales
Rafael Búcaro 16' 25'		Nil

Estadio Nacional Flor Blanca

December 22, 1974

Negocios Internacionales	2-0	Platense Municipal Zacatecoluca
Roberto Fernández 24' 83'		Nil

Estadio Nacional Flor Blanca

December 29, 1974

Platense	1-1	Negocios Internacionales
Luis César Condomí 1'		Luis Ernesto Tapia 26'
Penalties
Norberto Zafanella (penalty scored); Luis César Condomí (penalty scored); Jorge Búcaro (penalty scored); Mauricio González (penalty missed); Rafael Búcaro (penalty scored)	4-3	Mario Hugo Méndez (penalty scored); Roberto Fernández (penalty scored); Luis Ernesto Tapia (penalty scored); Rey Cabrera (penalty missed); Jorge Navidad Linares (penalty missed)

Estadio Nacional Flor Blanca

Platense
{{|1974-1975|1st|variant=|size=45x32px|name=}}

== Records ==
=== Top scorers ===
Pos	Player	Team	Goals
1.	(El Salvador) Sergio Méndez	Atletico Marte	27
2.	(El Salvador) David Cabrera	FAS	20
3.	(El Salvador) Oscar Guerrero (Lotario)	Platense	14
4.	(Paraguay) Nelson Brizuela	Municipal Limeno	14
5.	(Argentina) Guillermo Fischer	Sonsonate	14
6.	(Brazil) Helio Rodriguez	Aguila	14
7.	(Brazil) David Antonio Pinho	Aguila	14
8.	(El Salvador) Jose Edgardo Contreras	Sonsonate	13
9.	(Argentina) Tony Rojas	UES	13
10.	(El Salvador) Rafael Bucaro	Platense	12

=== Scoring ===
- First goal of the season: (El Salvador) Herbert Machón for Alianza against Platense, 27 minutes (March 17, 1974)
- First goal by a foreign player: (Argentina) Tony Rojas for UES against Aguila, 66th minutes (March 20, 1974)
- Fastest goal in a match: 1 Minutes
  - (Argentina) Luis César Condomí for Platense against Negocios Internacionales (December 22,1974)
- Goal scored at the latest goal in a match: 90+7 minutes
  - (El Salvador) Ismael “Cisco” Díaz goal for Aguila against Atletico Marte, (May 5, 1974)
- First penalty Kick of the season: (El Salvador) Jorge “Indio” Vásquez for Atletico Marte against FAS, th minutes (March 17, 1974)
- Widest winning margin: 6 goals
  - Platense 5–0 Negocios Internacionales (November 17, 1974)
- First hat-trick of the season: (El Salvador) Eduardo “Conejo” Valdez for FAS against Alianza (October 15, 1974)
- First own goal of the season: (El Salvador) Salvador Mariona (Alianza) for FAS (July 31, 1974)
- Most goals in a match: 7 goals
  - Aguila 3-4 Sonsonate (September 29, 1974)
  - Negocios Internacionales 5-2 Sonsonate (October 27, 1974)
- Most goals by one team in a match: 5 goals
  - Platense 5–0 Negocios Internacionales (November 17, 1974)
  - Negocios Internacionales 5-2 Sonsonate (October 27, 1974)
- Most goals in one half by one team: 4 goals
  - Negocios Internacionales 4-0 (5-2) Sonsonate (1st half, October 27, 1974)
- Most goals scored by losing team: 3 goals
  - Aguila 3-4 Sonsonate (September 29, 1974)
  - LA Firpo 3–4 Sonsonate (November 3, 1974)
  - Municipal Limeno 3–4 Aguila (November 3, 1974)
- Most goals by one player in a single match: 4 goals
  - (El Salvador) Sergio Méndez for Atletico Marte against Municipal Limeno (October 27, 1974)
- Players that scored a hat-trick':
  - (El Salvador) Eduardo “Conejo” Valdez for FAS against Alianza (October 15, 1974)
  - (El Salvador) Sergio Méndez for Atletico Marte against Municipal Limeno (October 27, 1974)

== List of foreign players in the league ==
This is a list of foreign players in 1974-75 Campeonato. The following players:

1. have played at least one apertura game for the respective club.
2. have not been capped for the El Salvador national football team on any level, independently from the birthplace

C.D. Águila

- (Argentina) Rodolfo Baello
- (Brazil) Germano Neto
- (Brazil) David Antonio Pinho
- (Brazil) Helio Rodríguez

Alianza F.C.

- (Argentina) Daniel Antonio Ron
- (Chile) Miguel Hermosilla
- (Chile) Hugo Ottensen
- (Chile) Enrique Iturra

Atletico Marte

- (Brazil) Carlos Roberto Barboza
- (Brazil) Elenílson Franco
- (Brazil) Enos Pereira

C.D. FAS

- (Argentina) Héctor Alcides Piccioni
- (Argentina) Domingo Albil
- (Argentina) Manolo Jovino Álvarez

(player released mid season) (player Injured mid season) Injury replacement player

LA Firpo

- (Brazil) Nelson de Moraes
- (Brazil) Juarandyr dos Santos
- (Peru) Guillermo Correa

Municipal Limeno

- (Argentina) Juan Andrés Ríos
- (Guatemala) Ernest Geoffrey García
- (Paraguay) Nelson Brizuela

Negocios Internacionels

- (Argentina) René Joaquin Cazalbón
- (Panama) Luis Ernesto Tapia “Cascarita”
- (Uruguay) Raúl Héctor Biardo
- (Uruguay) Raúl Vásquez
- (Uruguay) Roberto Fernández

Platense

- (Argentina) Luis César Condomí
- (Argentina) Ricardo Norberto Zafanella
- (Uruguay) Albert Fay

Sonsonate

- (Argentina) Guillermo Fischer
- (Chile) Wilfredo Barrientos
- (Costa Rica) José Antonio Mendoza Avellán
- (Costa Rica) Enrique “Pity” Valle
- (Panama) Valentín Aguilar

UES

- (Argentina) Victor Donato
- (Argentina) Tony Rojas
- (Panama) Néstor Hernández Polo
