= C.D. Platense Municipal Zacatecoluca =

Association football club in El Salvador

C.D. Platense
- Full name: Club Deportivo Platense Municipal de Zacatecoluca
- Nicknames: Los Virolenos; Los Gallos (The Roosters)
- Founded: 1 May 1950; 76 years ago
- Ground: Estadio Antonio Toledo Valle
- Capacity: 10,000
- Chairman: (El Salvador) Ing.Carlos René Burgos Alvarado
- Manager: (Colombia) Martin Garcia
- League: (El Salvador) Primera División
- 2026 Clausura: Overall: 9th Playoffs: Did not qualify
Home colours	Away colours

Club Deportivo Platense Municipal Zacatecoluca, usually abbreviated to just Platense, is a Salvadoran football club based in Zacatecoluca, the departmental capital city of La Paz Province, they currently play in the Primera División. The club play their home games at the Estadio Panorámico de Zacatecoluca, which has a capacity of 10,000.

== History ==
The football club was founded on 1 May 1951. one of the key founder Napoleón Villalta stated one of the key reasons for starting the club was to give the reserves players of historic club 11 Viroleño an opportunity for game time.

Another founder Ramiro Díaz suggested the club name as a tribute to Argentinian club Club Atlético Platense.

At the beginning of the 1970s, the club was still an obscure football team playing in the regional amateur division. They steadily improved and by 1972 were playing in Tercera division.

Around this time, the Rengifo family took over the financial and administration side of the club gathering new sponsors and contributing large amount of their own family fortune. Their contributions generated almost immediate results: in 1973 the club under the direction of Brazilian Jorge Tupinambá dos Santos won the Tercera División for the first time and earned promotion to the Segunda División de Fútbol Salvadoreño.

Despite this success, The Rengifo family parted ways with Jorge Tupinambá dos Santos and hired Argentinian Juan Quarterone whose new tactics, player recruitment and training methods helped the team win the Segunda División de Fútbol Salvadoreño in 1974 and earn promotion to the Salvadoran Primera División for the first time in the club history.

Platense did the impossible and won the 1975 Primera division, they also set various records doing so such being the second team to win the title after gaining promotion in their very first season (Aguila in 1959 being the first), The club had won all three titles i three different division consecutively, The club also completed the double winning the primera and the Torneo Fraternidad / UNCAF Club Championship.

=== International success (1975) ===
Platense along with domestic success, became the first Salvadoran team to win the Torneo Fraternidad / UNCAF Club Championship in 1975 thanks to players such as Albert Fay, Jaime Castro, Helio Rodríguez, "Ninón" Osorio, Pedro Silva, Jorge "el Indio" Vásquez, José Luis Rugamas, David Pinho, Luis Condomi, Ricardo Zafanella, Jorge Búcaro and Rafael "Ráfaga" Búcaro.

=== Decline ===
After the highs of 1975, The club still remained a competitive force in 1976–1978, however the club fortune began to dwindle when the Regnifo family fled El Salvador due to the increasing conflict in the country. Soon the clubs could not retain their star players and were eventually relegated in 1980. As the civil war continued the club continued to flounder in the Segunda Division and eventually after 10 years he club was relegated to Tercera diving during the early 1990–91 season. It would take another 13 years before the club will be promoted back into second division thanks to future internationals Luis Anaya and former World cup player as coach Mauricio Alfaro.

=== Resurgence and promotion ===
Following increased support by the community and stronger financial backing by local businesses, Platense began a resurgence in the second division. The club recruited first team coach Jorge Abrego and key players such as Herberth Ramos, Wilber Arizala. Platense won their first second division in 45 years. Winning the Apertura 2019 title by defeating Racing Jr 4–3 on aggregate. They were on the verge of winning back to back titles, Sadly 2020 Clausura season was suspended due to the outbreak of coronavirus in El Salvador. It was then announced that despite winning the 2019 title that no promotion would occur.

Despite the disappointment of being denied promotion, the departures of key players such as the league and club top scorer Colombian Cristian Gil Hurtado, Keeper Herberth Ramos, and the sacking of Jorge Abrego as coach. The club overcame this by hiring experienced coach Guillermo Rivera and players such as Rafael Burgos, Colombian Juan Camilo Delgado and . This would enable the club to win their second title in recent time by defeating AD Destroyer 4–3 on penalties after the game ended 2–2 in regular time.

After a season of consolidation, It appeared that Platense would win three straight titles in a row, they reached the final and were leading 3–0. However the club would let in 3 late goals and would the game 5–4 on penalties.

On 20 June 2021, after 41 years out of the Primera Division, Platense were promoted back to the top flight following a 2–1 playoff victory against regular title contenders AD Destroyer 2–1 with goals coming from Steve Alfaro and Camilo Delgado.

=== Recent events ===
Under Guillermo Rivera, Platense competed in the first season in the primera division in 41 years, Platense finished sixth. They defeated Luis Angel Firpo 4–3 aggregate in the quarter-final. In the semi-final, they defeated Chalatenango 2–1 on the aggregate to advance to the final of a major tournament for the first time since 1975—and the club's first Primera division final in the Apertura/Clausura format—where they lost out to Alianza 2–1 at Estadio Cuscatlan on 20 December 2021. Colombian striker Juan Camilio Delgado was Platense top scorer with twelve goals

== Club ==
=== Stadium ===
- Estadio Antonio Toledo Valle, Zacatecoluca, La Paz Department (El Salvador) (1974-Present)
  - Estadio Jiboa, San Vicente (2009)
  - Polideportivo Tecoluca, San Vincente (2020–2021)
  - Estadio Cuscatlan (2022–present) games in the CONCACAF Champions League
  - Estadio Jorge "El Mágico" González (1975, 2025) games in the UNCAF tournament and during renovations to Estadio Antonio Toledo Valle .

Platense plays its home games at Estadio Antonio Toledo Valle in Zacatecoluca, La Paz. The stadium "Estadio Antonio Toledo Valle", which previously belonged to the National Institute of Sports (INDES), now are being cared for by the municipality. During stadium renovations in 2020, they played their matches in the Polideportivo Tecoluca, San Vincente.

=== Rivalries ===
Platense Municipal Zacatecoluca's main rival was C.D. Tehuacan. They were rivals since the clubs were only separated by 11 km. The final result was a 3:0 victory to Platense Municipal Zacatecoluca. However, since Tehuacan was dissolved in 2009.

=== El Derbi Viroleño ===
The rivalry between Platense and Zacatecoluca is known as the "El Derbi Viroleño" due to the fact that both teams are based not only on the same department, La Paz Department, but also in the same city Zacatecoluca.

The intense feelings between the two sides began recently due to the close proximity and the switching of players between the clubs. The club "big brother, little brother" relationship between the clubs themselves, as Platense is a historic club while Zacatecoluca was only founded in 2023.

The team have started facing each once Zacatecoluca were promoted to the first division. The most recent match was 3-2 loss on the 23 March 2026. The teams have played 4 matches in all competitions, Platense winning 1, Zacatecoluca 2, and the remaining 1 having been drawn

=== Sponsorship ===
Companies that Platense currently has sponsorship deals with for 2025-2026 include:

- (El Salvador) Tony sports – Official Kit Suppliers
- (El Salvador) GanaPlay – Official sponsors
- (El Salvador) Las Perritas – Official sponsors
- (El Salvador) Pollo Campestre – Official sponsors
- (El Salvador) Renosa – Official sponsors
- (Mexico) Electrolit – Official sponsors
- (El Salvador) Caja de Credito Zacatecoluca – Official sponsors
- (Germany) Volkswagen Camiones y Buses El Salvador – Official sponsors
- (El Salvador) Sugarmill INJIBOA – Official sponsors
- (El Salvador) BSA Construction LLC – Official sponsors
- (United States) EE Tri Carpentry Inc – Official sponsors
- (United States) Premier Touch Painting – Official sponsors
- Galvanissa El Salvador
- (El Salvador) Monster Gym
- (El Salvador) Ticketon
- (El Salvador) Laboratorio Clinico Milagro de dios
- (El Salvador) Multi Inversiones Lumitin JC – Official sponsors
- (El Salvador) Sudagripm – Official sponsors
- (El Salvador) Canal 4 – Official sponsors

== Records ==
The Salvadoran midfielder TBD holds the club's overall appearance record having played in matches over the course of 14 seasons from 19 to 19. Following him is former goalkeeper TBD who contested 000 matches over the course of 11 seasons from 1997 to 2008.

The club's all-time leading scorer is TBD, who scored 119 goals while at the club from 1991 to 1996. Despite TBD's impressive goalscoring record, he doesn't hold the record for most goals scored during a league season. That distinction is held by Brazilian TBD who notched 00 goals, which he attained in the TBD season.

Platense's biggest league victory is 11–0 which occurred during the TBD season against TBD. The club's biggest victory on the International (CONCACAF/UNCAF) stage occurred during the TBD season, where Platense hammered TBD-based club TBD 8–0.

TBD had the longest reign as Platense coach, with nine years (eight consecutive) in charge, and is the most successful coach in Platense history with three Primera division wins.

- Platense are only the third team to win the First Division in their very first season in the top flight in 1975 (Águila 1959 and Vista Hermosa 2005, are the other two)
- Platense are only one of two teams to win the Copa Interclubes UNCAF in 1975 (Alianza being the other in 1997)
- Platense were the first Salvadoran team to the win Copa Interclubes UNCAF in 1975
- Platense have won all three division titles Tercera Division (1973, 2003), Segunda Division (1974, Apertura 2019, Apertura 2020) and Primera División (1975)
- Platense is the first and so far only club to win a first division title while based in the La Paz Department (El Salvador)
- Record loss: 1–19 vs. Atlante, Cancha Jorgito Meléndez, 11 September 1968.
- Youngest player: Luis Guevara Mora (14 years and 2 months) v TBD 28 July 1975.
- Fastest goal scored for : Argentinian Gabriel Giacopetti (35 seconds) vs Atletico Marte, 24 April 2023
- Worst season: Segunda Division 1998-1999: 0 win, 2 draws and 25 losses (2 points)

=== Top goalscorers ===
No.	Player	period	Goals
1	(El Salvador) TBD	TBD–TBD	77
2	(El Salvador) TBD	TBD–TBD	26
3	(El Salvador) TBD	TBD–TBD	26
4	(El Salvador) TBD	TBD–TBD	26
5	(El Salvador) TBD	TBD–TBD	26
6	(El Salvador) TBD	TBD–TBD	26
7	(El Salvador) TBD	TBD–TBD	13
8	(El Salvador) Rafael Bucaro	1974–1975	31
9	(El Salvador) Oscar "Lotario" Guerrero	1970–1975/1974–75	00 / 26
10	(Colombia) Juan Camilo Delgado	2018–2022	43

Note: Players in bold text are still active with Platense

=== Goalscoring champions ===
Position	Player	Season	Goals Scored
1	(Colombia) Cristian Gil	Apertura 2019	11
1	(Colombia) Camilo Delgado	Clausura 2021	11
1	(Colombia) Jhonathan Urrutia	Clausura 2025	9

=== Overall seasons table in Primera División de Fútbol Profesional ===
As of 16 November 2025, after their 4-1 loss FAS

Pos.	Club	Season In D1	Pl.	W	D	L	GS	GA	Dif.
**TBA**	**C.D. Platense Municipal Zacatecoluca**	**12**	421	141	105	175	509	616	−107

=== Historical matches ===
January 1, 1973 Friendly	**Platense Municipal**	**1–0**	**Deportes Naval**	Zacatecoluca, El Salvador
	Oscar "Lotario" Guerrero		Nil	Stadium: Estadio Panorámico La Paz

February 13, 1974 Friendly	**Platense Municipal**	**4-2**	**Limon**	Zacatecoluca, El Salvador
	TBD; TBD; TBD		TBD; TBD	Stadium: Estadio Panorámico La Paz

March 11, 1975 Friendly	**Platense Municipal**	**1-1**	**Club Jalisco**	San Salvador, El Salvador
	Norberto Zafanella		Ricardo Marquez	Stadium: Estadio Cuscatlan

March 13, 1975 Friendly	**Platense Municipal**	**0-1**	**Club Jalisco**	San Salvador, El Salvador
	Nil		TBD	Stadium: Estadio Cuscatlan

January 16, 2023 Friendly - Copa Fraternidad Antonio Díaz	**Platense Municipal**	**2–2**	**Deportivo Achuapa**	Zacatecoluca, El Salvador
	Elvin Alvarado 56'; Geovany Valladares 95'		Eliser Quinonez 20' 35'	Stadium: Estadio Panorámico La Paz

== Honours ==
These awards are updated to October 2024. Throughout its history, the club has managed several international, national and regional titles that have made it occupy the top position in the ranking of the La Paz football teams, being considered one of the most outstanding Salvadoran football clubs.

=== Domestic ===
- Primera División Salvadorean and predecessors
  - Champions: (1): 1974–75
  - Runners-up: (1): Apertura 2021
- Segunda División Salvadorean and predecessors
  - Champions (3): 1974, Apertura 2019, Apertura 2020
  - Play-off winners (1): 2020–21
- Tercera Division and predecessors
  - Champions (2): 1973, 2003

=== International ===
- Copa Fraternidad and predecessors
  - Champions (1): 1975

== Current squad ==
As of: August, 2026 Note: Flags indicate national team as defined under FIFA eligibility rules; some limited exceptions apply. Players may hold more than one non-FIFA nationality.

No.	Pos.	Nation	Player
2	DF	ESA	Xavier García (captain)
3	MF	ESA	Brandao Zetino
4		ESA	Jonathan Palma
5	MF	ESA	Anthony Roque
6	MF	ESA	Josué Amílcar Palacios
7	MF	ESA	Wilmer Novoa (vice-captain)
8	MF	ESA	Vincio Munoz
9	MF	COL	Andres Bello
10	MF	COL	Manuel González
11	FW	COL	Carlos Bogotá
12	MF	ESA	Beethoven Martínez
14	FW	ESA	Denis Bautista
16	FW	ESA	David Zayas
17	MF	ESA	Isai Aguilar
19	MF	ESA	Alexis Ramos
20	DF	ESA	Diego Mejía
21	DF	COL	Brayan Palacios
22	GK	ESA	Cristopher Rauda
25	GK	ESA	Carlos Castro
26	MF	ESA	Franklin Martínez
29	MF	ESA	Jorge Mundo
32	MF	ESA	Roberto Rivera
—	MF	ESA	Sebastián Ortiz

No.	Pos.	Nation	Player
4	DF	ESA	Kevin Calderón
16	MF	ESA	Luis Aguilar
21	DF	ESA	Kevin Menjívar
28	MF	ESA	Alejandro Bonito
30	MF	ESA	Jefferson Roque
35	GK	ESA	Salvador Ponce

=== Players with dual citizenship ===
- (El Salvador) (Italy) Luis Aguilar

=== In ===
Note: Flags indicate national team as defined under FIFA eligibility rules; some limited exceptions apply. Players may hold more than one non-FIFA nationality.

No.	Pos.	Nation	Player
—	DF	COL	Brayam Manuel Palacios (From Boyacá Chicó)
—	MF	COL	Manuel Esteban González (From Free Agent)
—		COL	Andres Bello (From Alianza)
—	GK	ESA	Cristopher Rauda (From Alianza)
—		ESA	Vincio Munoz (From Zacatecoluca FC)

No.	Pos.	Nation	Player
—		ESA	David Zayas (From El Roble)
—		ESA	Isai Aguilar (From Cruzeiro)
—		ESA	Alexis Ramos (From TBD)
—		ESA	Jonathan Palma (From TBD)

=== Out ===
Note: Flags indicate national team as defined under FIFA eligibility rules; some limited exceptions apply. Players may hold more than one non-FIFA nationality.

No.	Pos.	Nation	Player
—		ESA	Emerson Sandoval (To Isidro Metapan)
—	DF	ESA	Kevin Ardon (To FAS)
—		COL	Víctor Landazuri (To Nacional FC)
—		COL	Yair Arboleda (To TBD)

No.	Pos.	Nation	Player
—		ECU	Michael Robinzon (To TBD)
—		ESA	Óscar Daniel Arroyo (To Atletico Balboa)
—		ESA	Bryan Rios (To FAS)
—		ESA	TBD (To TBD)

== Personnel ==
=== Coaching staff ===
As of June 2026

Position	Staff
Manager	(Colombia) Martin Garcia
Assistant manager	(El Salvador) Cristian Lopez (*)
Goalkeeping coach	(El Salvador) TBD (*)
Fitness coach	(Colombia) Wilmer Chaves (*)
Reserve Manager	(El Salvador) David Hernandez (*)
Sport Director	(Colombia) Martin Garcia (*)
Club Doctor	(El Salvador) Dr. Roberto Alvarenga (*)
Kineslogist	(El Salvador) Jose Rodriguez *
Physiotherapist	(El Salvador) Giovanni Solis (*)
Utility	(El Salvador) Gerson Rodas (*)
Utility	(El Salvador) (Italy) Jesus Cruz Mejia (*)
Utility	(El Salvador) Juan Jose Merino (*)
Video analyst	(El Salvador) Hector Ferman *
Ladies Manager	(El Salvador) Carlos Aparicio *
Under 17 Manager	(El Salvador) Ever Aguirre *

== Management ==
As of March 2025

Position	Staff
Owner	(El Salvador) Constructora Burgos & Asociados
President	(El Salvador) Ing. Carlos Burgos
Vice-president	(El Salvador) Sacerd. Carlos Torres
Alternate Vice-president	(El Salvador) Dr. Francisco Hirezi
Executive secretary	(El Salvador) Lic. Cecilia Portillo
Director of Operations	(El Salvador) Lic. Alfredo Miranda
Brand Representative	(El Salvador) Noe Arévalo
Administrative representative	(El Salvador) Prof. Jaime Chavez
Grassroots Representative	(El Salvador) TBD
Treasurer	(El Salvador) Denis Enmanuel Alfaro
Sports director	(Colombia) Martin Garcia
General Representative	Selvin Amaya (*)
Representative	Cesar Omar Garcia (*)
Mascot	Francisco Velasquez (*)

=== List of president ===
Name	Years
(El Salvador) Rafael Rengifo	1972-1975
(El Salvador) Vicente Reyes	1989-1991
(El Salvador) Carlos Torres	2017
(El Salvador) Carlos Burgos	2018–present

== Coaches ==
The club's current manager is Colombian Martin Garcia . There have been TBD permanent and TBD caretaker managers of Platense since the appointment of the club's first professional manager, Jose Antonio Toledo in 1950. The club's longest-serving manager, in terms of both length of tenure and number of games overseen, is TBD, who managed the club between 1996 and 2018. Uruguayan Víctor Pereira Viteca was Platense's first manager from outside the El Salvador. Argentinian Juan Quarterone is the club's most successful coach, having won their only Primera division title and international titles (1974-75 Primera and 1975 Copa Fraternidad), this followed by Guillermo Rivera who won one Segunda division title and one runners up Primera division title, Jorge Abrego and Brazilian Jorge Tupinambá dos Santos win Segunda division title. Mauricio Alfaro won one Tercera division title.

The following managers won at least one trophy when in charge of Platense
Name	Period	Trophies
(Brazil) Jorge Tupinambá † (1944–2017)	1972–1973	1 Tercera Division (1972), 1 Segunda Division (1973)
(Argentina) Juan Quarterone † (1935–2015)	1974–1975	1 Primera division (1974-75), 1 Copa UNCAF Fraternidad (1975)
(El Salvador) Mauricio Alfaro	1992–1993, 2003–2005	1 Tercera Division (2003)
(El Salvador) Jorge Abrego	2018–2020, 2023–2024	1 Segunda Division (Apertura 2019)
(El Salvador) Guillermo Rivera	2020–2022	1 Segunda Division (Apertura 2020), 1 Playoff/promotion title (2020–21)

Argentina:

- (Argentina) Gregorio Bundio (1970)
- (Argentina) Juan Quarterone (February 1974– December 1975)

Brazil:

- (Brazil) Jorge Tupinambá dos Santos (1972 - January 1974)
- (Brazil) Mauro de Oliveira (Jan 2014 – Nov 2014)
- (Brazil) Eraldo Correia (Mar 2018 – Apr 2018)

Colombia:

- (Colombia) Martin Garcia (May 2026 - Present)

Guatemala:

- (Guatemala) Jorge “Grillo” Roldán (January 1976 – 1977)

Peru:

- (Peru) Agustin Castillo (June 2025 - May 2026)

Spain:

- (Spain) Juan Cortés (March 2023 – October 2023)

Uruguay:

- (Uruguay) Víctor Pereira Viteca (1967–1968)
- (Uruguay) Ruben Da Silva (December 2022 – March 2023)

El Salvador:

- (El Salvador) Jose Antonio Toledo (1950-1952)
- (El Salvador) Jorge Cabrera Rajo
- (El Salvador) Maurisio Palma
- (El Salvador) Rogelio Castro (1973)
- (El Salvador) Jesús Landos (1978)
- (El Salvador) Raúl Magaña (1976–1978/1979)
- (El Salvador) Salvador Mariona (1978)
- (El Salvador) Francisco Zamora
- (El Salvador) Raul "Cayito" Mejía Fuentes
- (El Salvador) Mauricio Alfaro (1992–1993)
- (El Salvador) Manuel Pocasangre (2002–2003)
- (El Salvador) Mauricio Alfaro (2003–2005)
- (El Salvador) Luis Ángel León (2006)
- (El Salvador) Oscar Emigdio Benítez (2007)
- (El Salvador) Armando Contreras Palma (2008)
- (El Salvador) Juan Ramón Sánchez (2008)
- (El Salvador) Eduardo Lara Moscote (2010 – December 2013)
- (El Salvador) Oscar Parra (November 2014 – February 2015)
- (El Salvador) Nelson Ventura (February 2015 – May 2015)
- (El Salvador) Eduardo Lara Moscote (June 2015 – February 2016)
- (El Salvador) Miguel Aguilar Obando (February 2016 – September 2016)
- (El Salvador) Ervin Loza (Interim) (September 2016 – October 2016)
- (El Salvador) Salvador Velasquez Lovo (October 2016– February 2017)
- (El Salvador) Jose Mario Martinez (February 2017 – April 2017)
- (El Salvador) Juan Ramón Paredes (June 2017 – September 2017)
- (El Salvador) Afrodicio Valladares (Interim) (September 2017 – October 2017)
- (El Salvador) Omar Pimentel (October 2017 – March 2018)
- (El Salvador) Jorge Abrego (May 2018 – March 2020)
- (El Salvador) Guillermo Rivera (March 2020 – April 2022)
- (El Salvador) Ivan Ruiz (April 2022 – June 2022)
- (El Salvador) Erick Prado (June 2022 – December 2022)
- (El Salvador) Jorge Abrego (October 2023 - October 2024)
- (El Salvador) David Hernandez (October 2024 - June 2025)

== Notable former players ==
Players listed below have had junior and/or senior international caps for their respective countries before, while and/or after playing at Platense.

Players marked in bold gained their caps while playing at Platense.

- (El Salvador) Mauricio Alfaro
- (El Salvador) Luis Anaya
- (El Salvador) Salvador Cabezas
- (El Salvador) Rafael Burgos
- (El Salvador) (Uruguay) Albert Fay
- (Argentina) Roque Antonio 'Tony' Rojas
- (El Salvador) Salvador Mariona
- (El Salvador) Luis Guevara Mora
- (El Salvador) José Luis Rugamas
- (El Salvador) Rafael Bucaro
- (El Salvador) Martín Velasco
- (Argentina) Norberto Zafanella
- (Togo) Fábio Pereira de Azevedo
- (El Salvador) Manuel Gonzalez
- (El Salvador) Mauricio Esteban Mendez
- (El Salvador) Manuel Cañadas
- (El Salvador) Jorge Búcaro
- (El Salvador) Oscar Gustavo Guerrero
- (El Salvador) Óscar Daniel Arroyo
- (El Salvador) Xavier Garcia
- (Belize) **Krisean Lopez** (2 games)
- (Costa Rica) Fernando Montero
- (Costa Rica) Jorge Peralta
- (Guatemala) Armando Melgar Nelson
- (Nicaragua) Raúl Leguías
- (Nicaragua) Pablo Gállego
- (Panama) Jair Catuy

=== Team captains ===
Name	Years
(El Salvador) Alberto Villalta	TBD
(Argentina) Norberto Zafanella	TBD
(El Salvador) Edgar Cabrera	1974
(El Salvador) Jorge Búcaro	1974-75
(Costa Rica) TBD	1978
(El Salvador) Bernardo Montaña	2003
(El Salvador) Edgar Valladares	2018-2019
(El Salvador) Steve Alfaro	2021–2024
(El Salvador) Xavier Garcia	2024–2025
(El Salvador) Wilmer Novoa	2025
(El Salvador) Xavier Garcia	2026–present

== Sports statistics ==
- Updated to July 2021.

=== Sports general information ===
Sports general information
Concept	Times
Seasons in 1 ª	10
Seasons in 2 ª	34
Seasons in 3 ª	15
Promotions to 1 ª achieved	2
Participations in Copa Presidente	3
Participacipations in Concacaf Competitions	3
Position in the historical classification of the league	TBD
Number of internationals contributed to the El Salvador national football team	TBD

== Other departments ==
=== Football ===
==== Reserve team ====
The reserve team serves mainly as the final stepping stone for promising young players under the age of 21 before being promoted to the main team. The second team is coached by David Hernandez. the team played in the Primera División Reserves, their greatest successes were finishing runner up in the Reserve championships in the Clausura 2024. It plays its home matches at Estadio Antonio Toledo Valle, adjacent to the first teams and women's team.

Name	Nat	Tenure	Notes
David Hernandez	(El Salvador)	July 2021 - October 2024	Runners-up (Clausura 2024)
Elmer Guidos	(El Salvador)	October 2024 - April 2025	N/A
Eduardo Lara	(El Salvador)	April 2025 - June 2025	N/A
David Hernandez	(El Salvador)	June 2025 - Present	N/A

=== Current squad ===
As of: January 27, 2025 Note: Flags indicate national team as defined under FIFA eligibility rules; some limited exceptions apply. Players may hold more than one non-FIFA nationality.

No.	Pos.	Nation	Player
31		ESA	Beethoven Martinez (captain)
33		ESA	Jefferson Maldonaldo
34		ESA	Denis Bautista
35		ESA	Jefferson Cantor
36		ESA	Cesar Gochez
37		ESA	Christian Hernandez
38		ESA	Fernando Ramos
39		ESA	Diego Joya
40		ESA	Amadiel Garcia
41		ESA	Vicente Diaz
42		ESA	Lenin Gonzalez
43		ESA	Wilber Ascensio
44		ESA	Jonatan Alvaro
45		ESA	Jefry Rivera
47		ESA	Amado Ceron

No.	Pos.	Nation	Player
49		ESA	Lester Hernandez
50		ESA	Fernando Arevalo
51		ESA	Noe Ventura
52		ESA	Gabriel Sorto
53		ESA	Luis Arevalo
54		ESA	Jostyn Linares
55		ESA	Jeffrey Umana
56		ESA	Steven Flores
57		ESA	Edilson Montano
60		ESA	Mosis Carpio

==== Junior teams ====
The youth team (under 17 and under 15) has produced some of El Salvador's top football players, including TBD and TBD. It plays its home matches at TBD, adjacent to the first team's ground, and it is coached by Cristian Ernesto Lopez. The team greatest successes was winning Clausura 2025 season.

Name	Nat	Tenure	Notes
TBD	(El Salvador)	N/A	N/A
TBD	(El Salvador)	N/A	N/A
Cristian Ernesto Lopez	(El Salvador)	January 2025 - June 2025	1 Champion (Primera División Sub 17 Clausura 2025)
Ever Aguirre	(El Salvador)	July 2025 - Present	N/A

=== Current squad ===
As of: June, 2025 Note: Flags indicate national team as defined under FIFA eligibility rules; some limited exceptions apply. Players may hold more than one non-FIFA nationality.

No.	Pos.	Nation	Player
66		ESA	Dennys Vasquez
67		ESA	Luis Morales
68		ESA	Richard Cornejo
70		ESA	Ludgardo Flores
71		ESA	Kevin Gomez
72		ESA	Mariano Reyes
73		ESA	Aldo Perez
74		ESA	Lester Mejia
75		ESA	Fredy Aldana
76		ESA	Omar Mancia
77		ESA	Cristopher Choto

No.	Pos.	Nation	Player
78		ESA	Emerson Gomez
79		ESA	Marvin Escobar
80		ESA	Victor Paredes
81		ESA	Fernando Lara
82		ESA	Esteban Pinto
83		ESA	Kenedi Cornejo
84		ESA	Steward Morales

==== Women's team ====
The women's first team, which is led by head coach Everist Martinez, features several members of the El Salvador national ladies team. Their greatest successes was reaching the semi finals of Apertura 2023, where they lost 10–1 on aggregate to Alianza Women's. On May 15, 2026, It was announced the club will be partnering with Academia BP, which will allow Academia BP players to have a step up in talents pathways,

Name	Nat	Tenure
Afrodicio Valladares	(El Salvador)	July 2021 - December 2024
Everist Martinez	(El Salvador)	January 2025 - June 2026
Carlos Aparicio	(El Salvador)	June 2026 - Present

=== Current squad ===
As of: July, 2026 Note: Flags indicate national team as defined under FIFA eligibility rules; some limited exceptions apply. Players may hold more than one non-FIFA nationality.

No.	Pos.	Nation	Player
1	GK	ESA	Naama Martinez
6	DF	ESA	Carolina Gonzalez
11	MF	ESA	Hazel Solorzano
17	DF	ESA	Alejandra Rodriguez
8	MF	ESA	Tatiana Terezon
21	GK	ESA	Nathalia Melara
9	FW	ESA	Carmen Pena
14		ESA	Nicole Araujo
5	DF	ESA	Victoria Lazo
—	DF	ESA	Erika Nufio
22		ESA	Parmela Martinez
15		ESA	Erika Romero
10	MF	ESA	Yaneth Sotelo
—	DF	ESA	Karla Perez
3	DF	ESA	Daniela Duran

No.	Pos.	Nation	Player
29	FW	ESA	Lourdes Gutierrez
—	MF	ESA	Keila Lino
12	DF	ESA	Clara Lazo
—	MF	COL	Daniela Orozco
—	GK	ESA	Naama Chavez
—	MF	ESA	Odalis Salazar
2		ESA	Karla Flores
—	FW	ESA	Damaris Quélez
