= Mauricio Alfaro =

Salvadoran footballer (born 1956)

Personal information
- Full name: Mauricio Alberto Alfaro Valladares
- Date of birth: 13 February 1956 (age 70)
- Place of birth: Zacatecoluca, El Salvador
- Height: 1.81 m (5 ft 11 in)
- Position: Midfielder

Youth career
- 1976–1977: CD Dragón

Senior career*
Years	Team	Apps	(Gls)
1978–1979, 1982	Platense		
1980–1982	Alianza FC		
1983–1987	CD FAS		
1987–1991	Cojutepeque FC		
1991	Platense		

International career
1977–1989	El Salvador	41	(3)

Managerial career
- 1992–1993: Platense
- 1994–1996: San Rafael FC
- 1997–1999: Municipal
- 2000–2003: Telecom FC
- 2003–2005: Platense
- 2005–2006: Coca-Cola
- 2009–2014: El Salvador U-21
- 2010–2012: El Salvador (assistant coach / interim coach)
- 2011–2014: El Salvador U-20
- 2015: Atlético Comalapa
- 2015–2016: Quequeisque
- 2016: CD Municipal Limeño
- 2019: CD Atlético Marte
Medal record
Representing El Salvador (as manager)
FIFA U-20 World Cup
Third place	2013 Turkey
- * Club domestic league appearances and goals

Mauricio Alberto Alfaro Valladares (born 13 February 1956), nicknamed El Tuco, is a former soccer professional player from El Salvador, who represented his country at the 1982 FIFA World Cup in Spain.

== Club career ==
Nicknamed El Tuco, Alfaro started his career at Platense and later joined Salvadoran giants FAS in 1983.

With FAS he won a league title in 1984. He finished his career with Cojutepeque, with whom he lost the 1988/89 national league final to Luis Ángel Firpo.

== International career ==
He made his debut for El Salvador in 1979, and has earned over 15 caps.

He has represented his country in 10 FIFA World Cup qualification matches and played in the 1982 FIFA World Cup final group stage match, against Argentina.

== Managerial career ==
His first job was at Platense, where he was dismissed in January 2005.

He has coached varies clubs in the lower leagues of El Salvador, such as Telecom, Coca-Cola, Municipal and San Rafael F.C..

He was coached of El Salvador U-21 and El Salvador U-20, who he helped qualify for the 2010 Central American and Caribbean Games in Mayagüez, Puerto Rico and the 2013 FIFA U-20 World Cup.

He helped to El Salvador U-20 become the first Salvadoran team to win a game at a FIFA U-20 World Cup, by defeating the Australia team 2–1.

Later, he coached in the Primera División de El Salvador for the first time in 2016, leading the recently promoted Municipal Limeño in the Apertura 2016 campaign.

He later resigned, which came as a shock as he amassed a respectable five wins and six draws from seventeen games, he cited crowd problems and clashes with several players, as the main reasons.

== Honors ==
=== Club ===
FAS

- Primera División Winner (1): 1984

=== Manager ===
==== National team ====
Third Place

== Managerial stats ==
Team	Nat	From	To	Record				
Team	Nat	From	To	G	W	D	L	%
Municipal Limeño	El Salvador	July 2016	November 2016	17	5	6	6	29.4
