= Domingo Albil =

Argentinian footballer (1945–2024)

Personal information
- Full name: Domingo Jorge Albil
- Date of birth: 3 July 1945
- Place of birth: Totoras, Santa Fe, Argentina
- Date of death: 16 October 2024 (aged 79)
- Place of death: Buenos Aires, Argentina
- Position: Midfielder

Senior career*
Years	Team	Apps	(Gls)
1964–1966	Central Córdoba		
1967	All Boys		
1968	León de Huánuco		
1969	Central Córdoba		
1970	Blooming		
1970–72	FAS		
1972	Central Córdoba		
1973	Juventud de Pergamino		
1974	Central Córdoba		
1974–76	FAS		
1976–77	Sonsonate		
- * Club domestic league appearances and goals

Domingo Jorge Albil (3 July 1945 – 16 October 2024) was an Argentinian footballer. Nicknamed "Pilli", he primarily played for Central Córdoba in his native country and for FAS and Sonsonate in El Salvador where he spent a majority of his career in.

== Career ==
Born on 3 July 1945, Albil was given the nickname "Pilli" by his friends as he began his career with Central Córdoba for the 1964 season. The following season, he played for All Boys in 1967, León de Huánuco for the 1968 Torneo Descentralizado, Central Córdoba in 1969 and Blooming for the first few games of the 1970 Bolivian Campeonato Nacional. The 1970s would see the beginning of his career in El Salvador for the upcoming 1970 Salvadoran Primera División to play for FAS. He was a part of a generation of footballers that included fellow Argentine players Héctor Piccioni, Manolo Álvarez, Gonzalo Henríquez, Héctor González, Roberto López and Raúl Casadei as Albil would make a series of contribution towards the club becoming recognized in international football. During his first tenure with the club, he gained the prestige of being the first player to score a goal scored in the night during a friendly against Aurora on 20 April 1972. Despite briefly returning to Argentina to play for Central Córdoba and Juventud de Pergamino in 1973 and 1974 respectively, he returned to FAS to play for the 1974–75 Primera División de Fútbol Profesional where the club finished in fifth. Despite the initially disappointing result, the club bounced back at the 1975–76 Primera División de Fútbol Profesional, becoming runners-up during the tournament. Albil retired at the end of the following season with Sonsonate.

== Personal life ==
Albil married Marta Chiavon and had a son and a daughter: Damián Albil and Paola Albil with the former becoming a footballer like his father and the latter being born in Santa Ana. He died on 16 October 2024 in Buenos Aires.
