= Óscar Daniel Arroyo =

Salvadoran footballer (born 1990)

Personal information
- Full name: Óscar Daniel Arroyo Peña
- Date of birth: 28 January 1990 (age 36)
- Place of birth: Santa Ana, El Salvador
- Height: 1.82 m (6 ft 0 in)
- Position: Goalkeeper

Team information
- Current team: Platense

Youth career
- 2006–2008: San Salvador FC
- 2008–2011: FAS

Senior career*
Years	Team	Apps	(Gls)
2011–2014	FAS	20	(0)
2014–2020	Alianza	152	(0)
2020–2021	Chalatenango	14	(0)
2022–2025	Isidro Metaṕan	43	(0)
2025–	Platense		

International career
2015–2017	El Salvador	5	(0)
- * Club domestic league appearances and goals as of 05:20, 11 September 2023 (UTC)

Óscar Daniel Arroyo Peña (born 28 January 1990) is a Salvadoran professional footballer who plays as a goalkeeper for Primera División de El Salvador club Platense. He is a former El Salvador international.

== International career ==
Arroyo was selected with El Salvador for the 2015 and 2017 CONCACAF Gold Cups. He made five appearances for the team in 2016.

== Honours ==
Alianza

- Primera División de Fútbol de El Salvador: Apertura 2015, Apertura 2017, Clausura 2018, Apertura 2019
