= Luis Condomi =

Argentine footballer

Luis Cesar Condomi
Personal information
- Date of birth: December 19, 1948
- Place of birth: Buenos Aires, Argentina
- Date of death: December 23, 2014 (aged 66)
- Place of death: Mexico
- Position: Midfielder

Senior career*
Years	Team	Apps	(Gls)
1970	C.D. Juventud Olimpico Metalio		
1970–1971	Atletico Marte		
1972–1974	C.D. Juventud Olimpico Metalio		(7)
1974–1975	C.D. Platense Municipal Zacatecoluca		
1976–1978	Atletico Marte		
1978–1983	Coban Imperial		
1984	C.D. Aguila		
- * Club domestic league appearances and goals as of March 2014

Luis Cesar Condomi (December 19, 1948 – December 23, 2014) was an Argentine football (soccer) midfielder who played for several clubs in El Salvador and Guatemala.

== Club career ==
Condomi played club football in El Salvador for C.D. Juventud Olimpico Metalio, Atletico Marte, C.D. Platense Municipal Zacatecoluca and C.D. Aguila before moving to Guatemala in 1978 to play for Coban Imperial.
