= Antonio Toledo Valle Stadium =

Multi-use stadium in Zacatecoluca, El Salvador

Coordinates: 13°31′11″N 88°52′18″W

- Estadio Antonio Toledo Valle
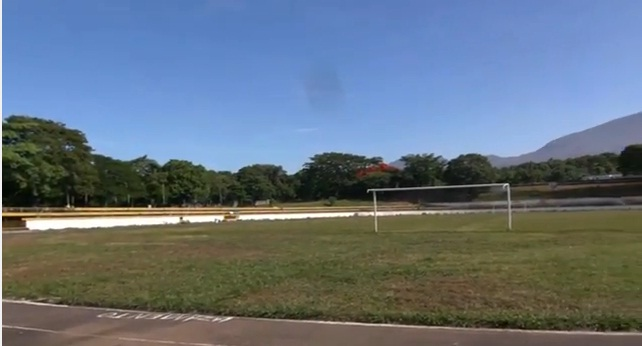
- Interactive map of Antonio Toledo Valle Stadium
- Full name: Estadio Antonio Toledo Valle
- Former names: Estadio Panorámico La Paz
- Location: La Paz, El Salvador
- Owner: Municipal de Zacatecoluca
- Operator: INDES
- Capacity: 10,000 approx
- Surface: Grass

Construction
- Built: 1974
- Renovated: 2009
- Architect: Olímpico

Tenants
- C.D. Platense Municipal Zacatecoluca (1974–present); Zacatecoluca (2023–present)

Antonio Toledo Valle Stadium (Spanish: Estadio Antonio Toledo Valle) is a multi-use stadium in Zacatecoluca, El Salvador. It is currently used mostly for football matches and is the home stadium of C.D. Platense Municipal Zacatecoluca. The stadium currently has a capacity of 10,000 people. It was built in 1974, on orders of then president of El Salvador Arturo Armando Molina. The stadium is named after Antonio Toledo Valle, a native footballer from the region who went on to play for C.D. Platense Municipal Zacatecoluca and several clubs in El Salvador and Mexico.
