= Antonio Toledo (footballer) =

El Salvadorean footballer

Personal information
- Full name: Jose Antonio Toledo Valle
- Date of birth: c. 1912
- Place of birth: Zacatecoluca, El Salvador
- Date of death: c. 2003
- Place of death: near Zacatecoluca, El Salvador
- Position: Forward

Senior career*
Years	Team	Apps	(Gls)
- Hércules
1941	Deportivo 33		
- Policía Nacional
- Quequeisque
1942-1943	Albinegros de Orizaba		

International career
1938–1941	El Salvador		

Managerial career
- 1950-1952: Platense
- * Club domestic league appearances and goals

Jose Antonio Toledo Valle (c. 1912 – c. 2003) was a famous football player and manager from El Salvador.

== Career ==
Born in the district of Zacatecoluca, He went on the play for clubs in El Salvador and Mexico.

He made his debut for Albinegros de Orizaba in 1942-43 Copa Mexico match, although Antonio scored, the club went on to lose 3-1 against Veracruz .

=== International ===
He played for the El Salvador in the Campeonato Centroamericano y del Caribe 1941 tournament playing three games and scoring all three goals against Nicaragua. Though he did play for the national team in three unofficial games against Alajuelense in 1940.

=== Achievement ===
He has a stadium named after him Estadio Antonio Toledo Valle at his home district of Zacateccoluca.
