= Enrique Iturra =

Chilean footballer (1946–2021)

Personal information
- Full name: Enrique Iturra Díaz
- Date of birth: 27 June 1946
- Place of birth: Santiago, Chile
- Date of death: 10 November 2021 (aged 75)
- Place of death: Pedro Aguirre Cerda, Santiago, Chile
- Height: 1.88 m (6 ft 2 in)
- Position: Centre-back

Youth career
- Enrico Caruso
- Cultural PAC
- Unión Española

Senior career*
Years	Team	Apps	(Gls)
1967–1968	Transandino		
1969	Naval		
1970–1971	Ferroviarios		
1972	Santiago Morning		
1973	Pachuca		
1973–1975	Alianza FC		
1975	Tapachulteca		
1976	Sonsonate		
- * Club domestic league appearances and goals

Enrique Iturra Díaz (27 June 1946 – 10 November 2021) was a Chilean professional footballer who played as a centre-back for clubs in Chile, Mexico and El Salvador.

== Career ==
Iturra came to Pedro Aguirre Cerda commune at the age of 4 and played for the local clubs Enrico Caruso and Cultural Pedro Aguirre Cerda. A product of Unión Española youth system, in his country of birth he played for Trasandino, Naval, Ferroviarios and Santiago Morning.

He emigrated to Mexico in 1973 looking for a chance in the Mexican football, getting trials in both América thanks to Carlos Reinoso and Cruz Azul thanks to Alberto Quintano, but he finally joined Pachuca and made his debut playing alongside the Mexican Javier Bazán in a match where he was sent off.

Then he moved to El Salvador, met his compatriot Miguel Hermosilla and played for Alianza, Deportivo Tapachulteca and Sonsonate, his last club in 1976.

== Personal life ==
As a child, Iturra was nicknamed El Cabeza de Juguera (The Blender Head), but he is better known by the nickname that gave him when he was a player of Ferroviarios, El Chacal Iturra (The Jackal), due to the fact that he injured to a player of Naval with a sweep.

He married in El Salvador with María Elena Rodas and had two children, Antonio José and Anabella. Back in Chile, they separated.

Outside of a football field, he was known for a controversial personality, in addition to have fell into alcoholism and suffered for the deaths of his father and his brother. In 1991, he was stabbed by a drug addict and fell into depression. Thanks to his friend Miguel Merello, a journalist who said him "you have reached further than anyone could have thought, others did better, but nobody gave a peso for you", he moved forward and spent time as a motivational speaker and therapist on public buses.

He died on 10 November 2021 due to multiple health issues.
