= Jorge Tupinambá =

Brazilian football manager (1944–2017)

Personal information
- Full name: Jorge Tupinambá dos Santos
- Date of birth: March 16, 1944 (age 82)
- Place of birth: Rio de Janeiro, Brazil
- Date of death: 18 September 2017 (aged 73)
- Place of death: San Salvador, El Salvador

Senior career*
| Years | Team | Apps | (Gls) |
| 1966–1970 | Águila | | |

Managerial career
- 1972–1973: Platense
- 1973: El Salvador
- 1974: Luis Ángel Firpo
- 1975: ANTEL
- 1977–1978: Dragón
- Juventud Olímpica
- 1982–1987: UES
- 1987–1989: Sonsonate
- 1981–1982: Once Lobos
- 2001–2002: Once Municipal
- 1989–1992: Arcense
- 1992–1995: Antigua GFC
- 1995–1999: Victoria
- 1999: Águila
- * Club domestic league appearances and goals

Jorge Tupinambá dos Santos (born 16 March 1944 – 18 September 2017) was a Brazilian professional football player and manager.

== Honours ==
=== Player ===
==== Club ====
Aguila

- Primera División
  - Champion: 1967–68

==== Club ====
Platense

- Segunda División
  - Champion: 1973
