= C.D. Municipal Ilopaneco =

Association football club in El Salvador

Ilopaneco
- Full name: Club Deportivo Municipal Ilopaneco
- Founded: 14 January 2014; 12 years ago
- Capacity: Estadio Azteca, Ilopango
- Manager: Guillermo Rivera
- League: Segunda Division
- Grupo
Home colours

Club Deportivo Municipal Ilopaneco are a Salvadoran professional football club based in Ilopango, El Salvador. The club currently plays in the Second Division of El Salvador.

== Honours ==
=== Domestic honours ===
- Segunda División Salvadorean and predecessors
- Champions (1) : TBD
- Tercera División Salvadorean and predecessors
  - Champions:(1) : Clausura 2017
  - Runners-up:(1) : Apertura 2016

== Current squad ==
As of 2018: Note: Flags indicate national team as defined under FIFA eligibility rules; some limited exceptions apply. Players may hold more than one non-FIFA nationality.

No. / Pos. / Nation / Player; — / / SLV / Luis Orellana	No. / Pos. / Nation / Player; — / / SLV / Jorge Linares

== President ==
- (El Salvador)

== List of coaches ==
Ilopaneco has had 4 permanent managers since it first appointed Juan Carlos Reyes as coach in 2014. The longest-serving manager was Guillermo Rivera, who managed Managua for three years from March 2015 to September 2018. Uruguayan Juan Carlos Reyes was the foreign coach in the club. Guillermo Rivera is the most successful manager as he led the club to its first Professional title, the third division title in 2016.

- (Uruguay) Juan Carlos Reyes (August 2014 – March 2015)
- (El Salvador) Guillermo Rivera (March 2015 – September 2018)
- (El Salvador) Salvador Vasquez (September 2018– February 2019)
- (El Salvador) Victor Manuel Pacheco (February 2019– present)
