= Jefferson Viveros =

Colombian footballer (born 1988)

Personal information
- Full name: Jefferson Andrés Viveros Mina
- Date of birth: 21 December 1988 (age 37)
- Place of birth: Jamundí, Colombia
- Height: 1.87 m (6 ft 2 in)
- Position: Forward

Senior career*
| Years | Team | Apps | (Gls) |
| 2005 | Dépor | | |
| 2005–2007 | Río Abajo | | |
| 2006–2009 | San Francisco | | |
| 2010 | Barranquilla | | |
| 2011–2012 | Palestino | | |
| 2013 | San Antonio Unido | 7 | (1) |
| 2013–2014 | FAS | 18 | (9) |
| 2014 | Fortaleza | 6 | (1) |
| 2014–2015 | Uniautónoma | 4 | (0) |
| 2015 | Deportivo Mictlán | | |
| 2015–2016 | Municipal Limeño | 24 | (13) |
| 2017 | Juventud Independiente | 18 | (6) |
| 2017 | Comerciantes Unidos | 20 | (3) |
| 2017–2018 | Dragón | 15 | (4) |
| 2018 | Isidro Metapán | 16 | (6) |
| 2019 | Los Caimanes | 3 | (0) |
| 2019 | C.D. Real Sociedad | 5 | (0) |
- * Club domestic league appearances and goals as of 19:56, 18 January 2022 (UTC)

Jefferson Andrés Viveros Mina (born 21 December 1988) is a Colombian professional footballer who plays as a forward.
