= Zacatecoluca =

- Municipality
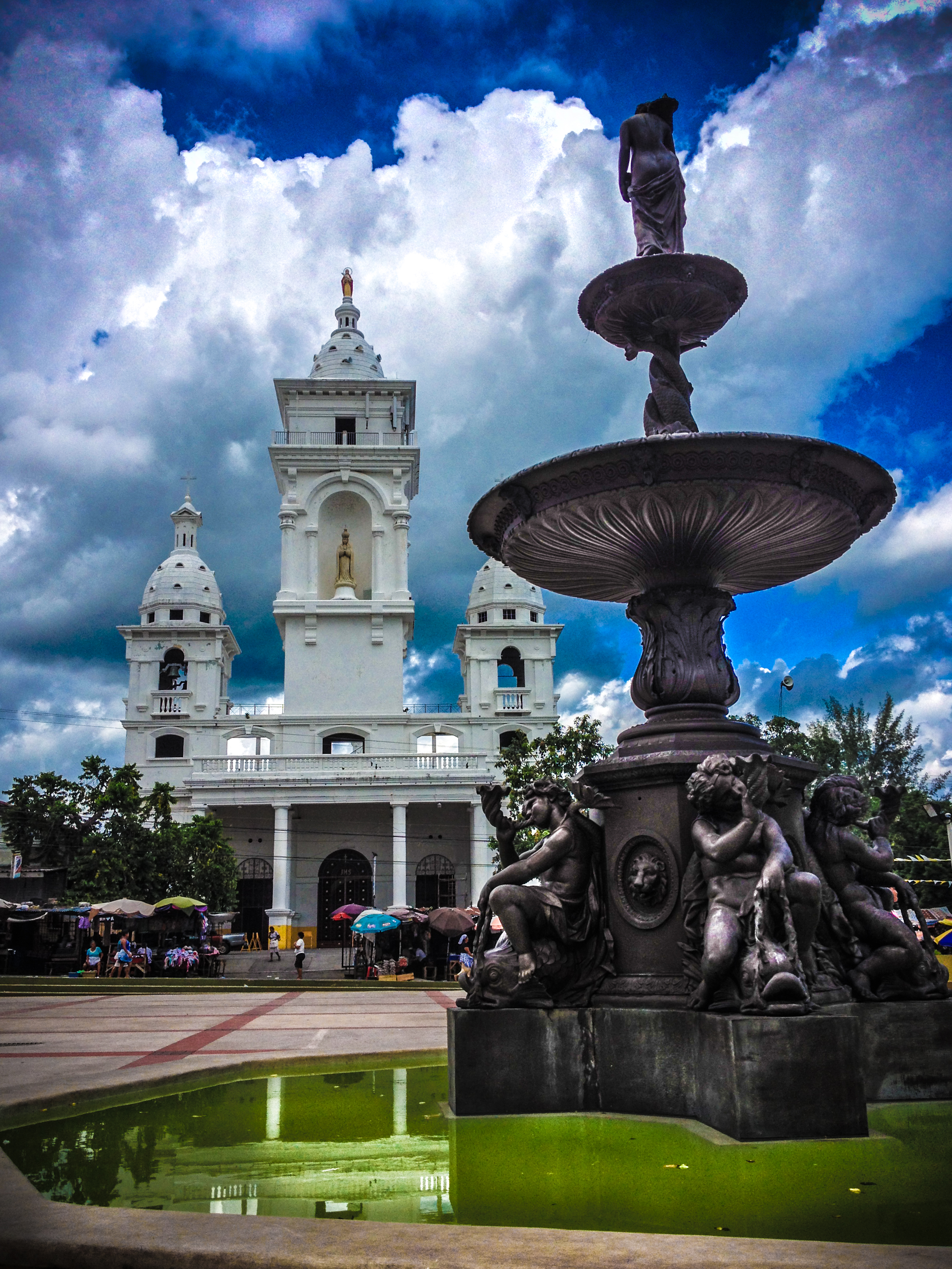
- Our Lady of the Poor Cathedral

- Location in El Salvador
- Coordinates: 13°30′N 88°52′W
- Country: El Salvador
- Department: La Paz
- Founded: 1852

Area
  - Total: 425.69 km^{2} (164.36 sq mi)
- Elevation: 210 m (690 ft)

Population (2016 census)
  - Total: 75,100
  - Density: 176/km^{2} (457/sq mi)

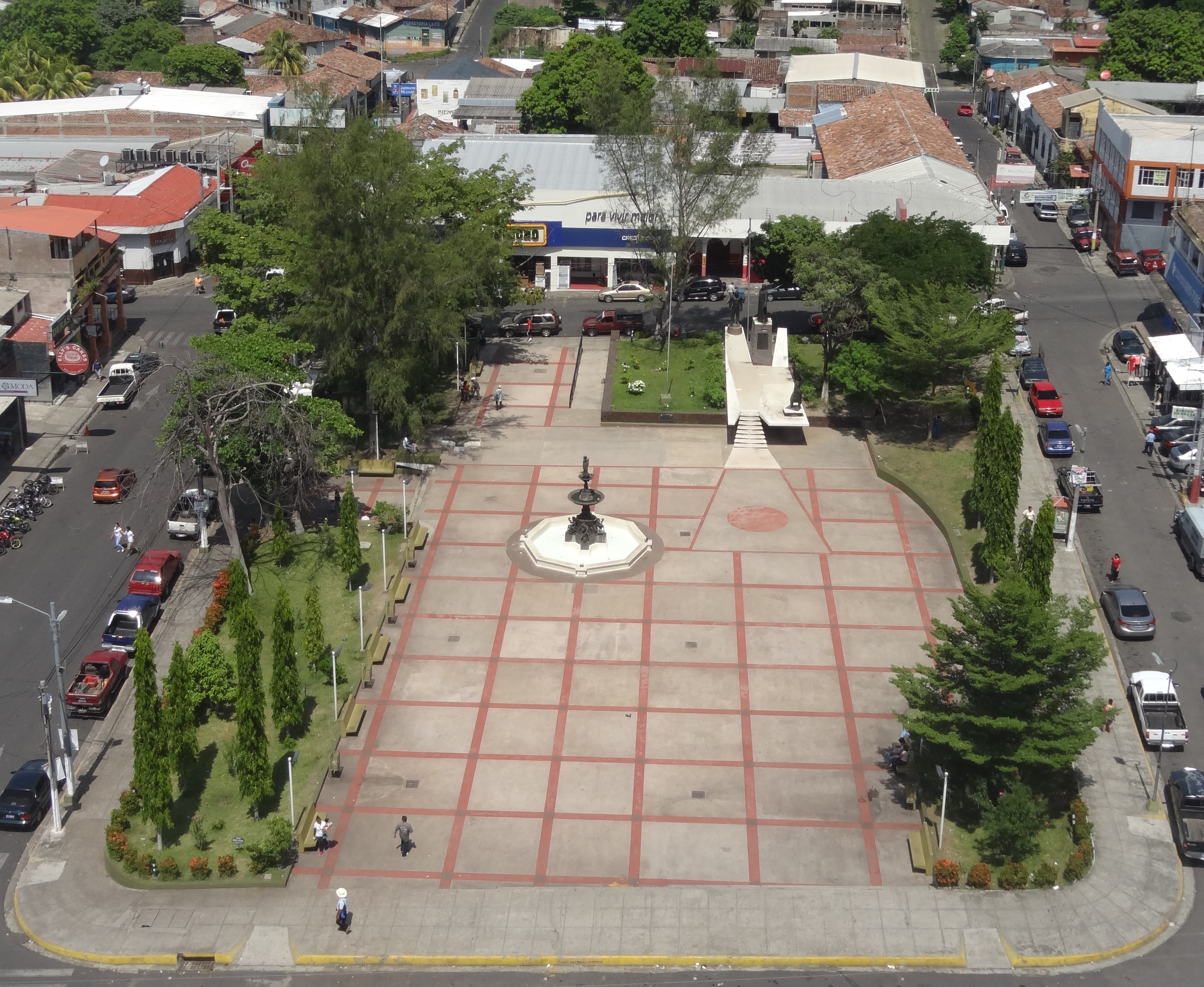
Zacatecoluca's historic center from the air.

Zacatecoluca (Spanish pronunciation: [sakatekoˈluka]) is the capital municipality of the La Paz Department of El Salvador.

Located in Southern El Salvador, in the Rio Lempa valley, at the foot of San Vicente (Chinchotepec) Volcano. A commercial center for the surrounding agricultural area, it also trades in cotton goods, baskets, salt, and lumber.

== History ==
An earthquake in 1932 caused severe damage.

Zacatecoluca was the birthplace of José Simeón Cañas, who fought for and secured the emancipation of slaves in Central America by Spaniards in 1825.

Zacatecoluca houses many traditional Spanish buildings including the Santa Lucia Catholic Church and used to hold the house where José Simeón Cañas lived, until poor economy due to the many years of war caused the local government to sell the house to a supermarket branch, the house was destroyed and a poorly marked stone on the left of the supermarket entrance is all that is left of Cañas' housing legacy.

Santa Lucia Catholic Church holds a dear history to the people of Zacatecoluca, as an image of Virgin Mary placed on top is said to have stopped an eruption of lava and ash from completely destroying the city and its local population. On May 11, 1844, Zacatecoluca received the title of Generous and Loyal City becoming the Departmental Head of La Paz on February 21, 1852.

== Geography ==
=== Climate ===
Climate data for Zacatecoluca
Month	Jan	Feb	Mar	Apr	May	Jun	Jul	Aug	Sep	Oct	Nov	Dec	Year
Mean daily maximum °C (°F)	32.1 (89.8)	32.2 (90.0)	33.3 (91.9)	33.1 (91.6)	31.7 (89.1)	30.2 (86.4)	31.4 (88.5)	30.8 (87.4)	29.7 (85.5)	29.8 (85.6)	30.5 (86.9)	31.0 (87.8)	31.3 (88.4)
Daily mean °C (°F)	24.4 (75.9)	24.5 (76.1)	26.0 (78.8)	26.5 (79.7)	26.0 (78.8)	25.0 (77.0)	25.4 (77.7)	25.0 (77.0)	24.4 (75.9)	24.3 (75.7)	24.2 (75.6)	23.8 (74.8)	25.0 (76.9)
Mean daily minimum °C (°F)	16.7 (62.1)	16.8 (62.2)	18.7 (65.7)	19.9 (67.8)	20.3 (68.5)	19.8 (67.6)	19.5 (67.1)	19.2 (66.6)	19.2 (66.6)	18.9 (66.0)	17.9 (64.2)	16.7 (62.1)	18.6 (65.5)
Average precipitation mm (inches)	9 (0.4)	3 (0.1)	14 (0.6)	47 (1.9)	200 (7.9)	379 (14.9)	318 (12.5)	327 (12.9)	412 (16.2)	328 (12.9)	60 (2.4)	8 (0.3)	2,105 (83)
Source: Climate-Data.org

== Sports ==
The local professional football club is named Platense and they are former national league champions. They currently play in the Salvadoran First Division.

== Gallery ==
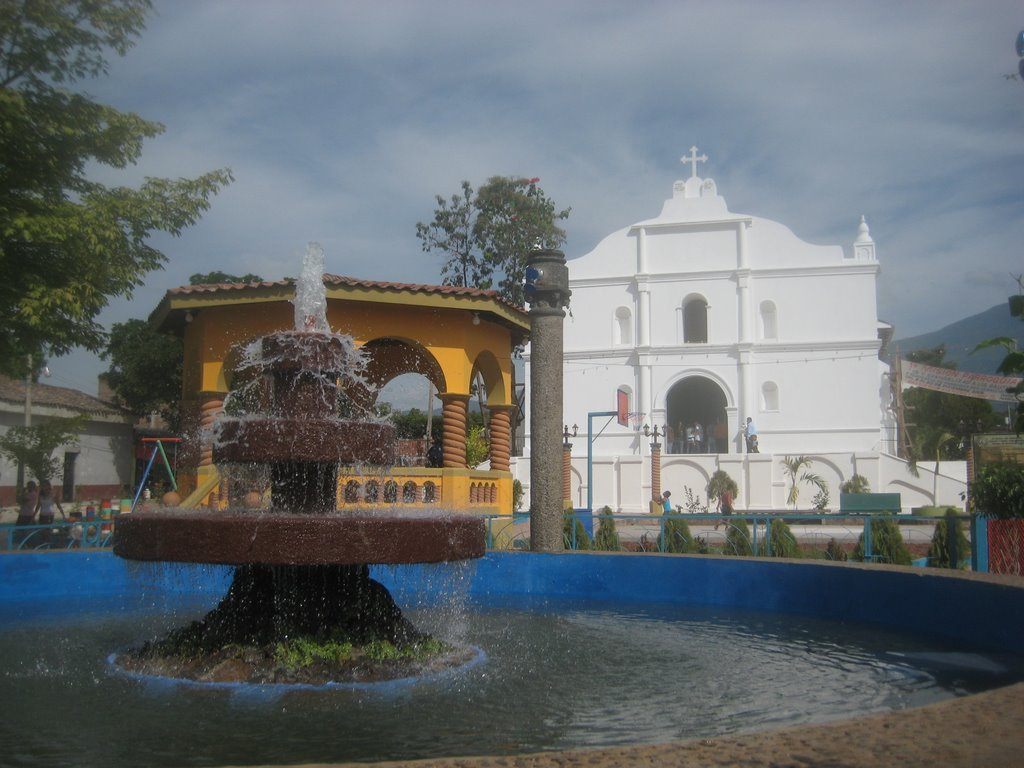
San Sebastian Analco church.

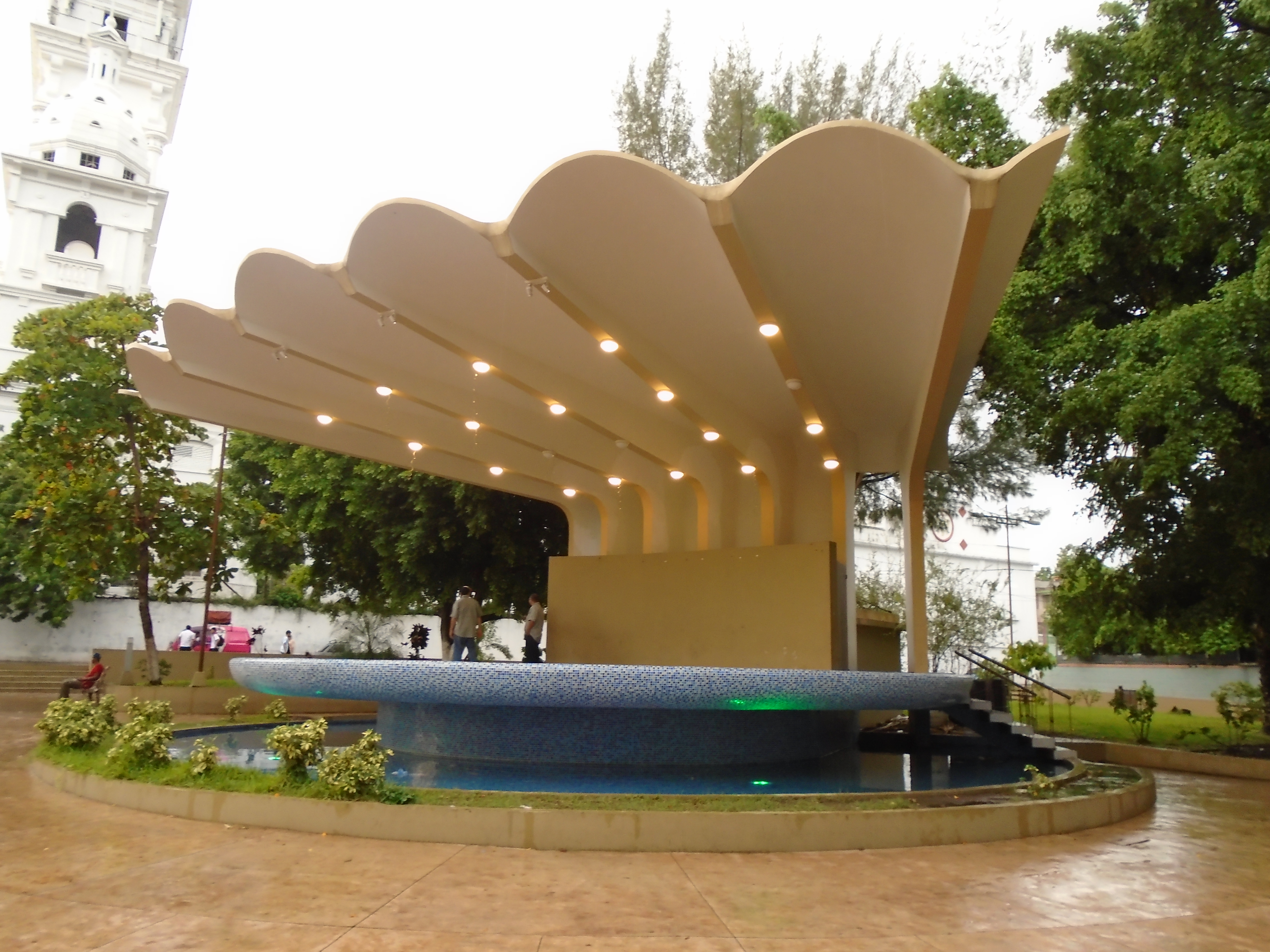
Concha Acústica.

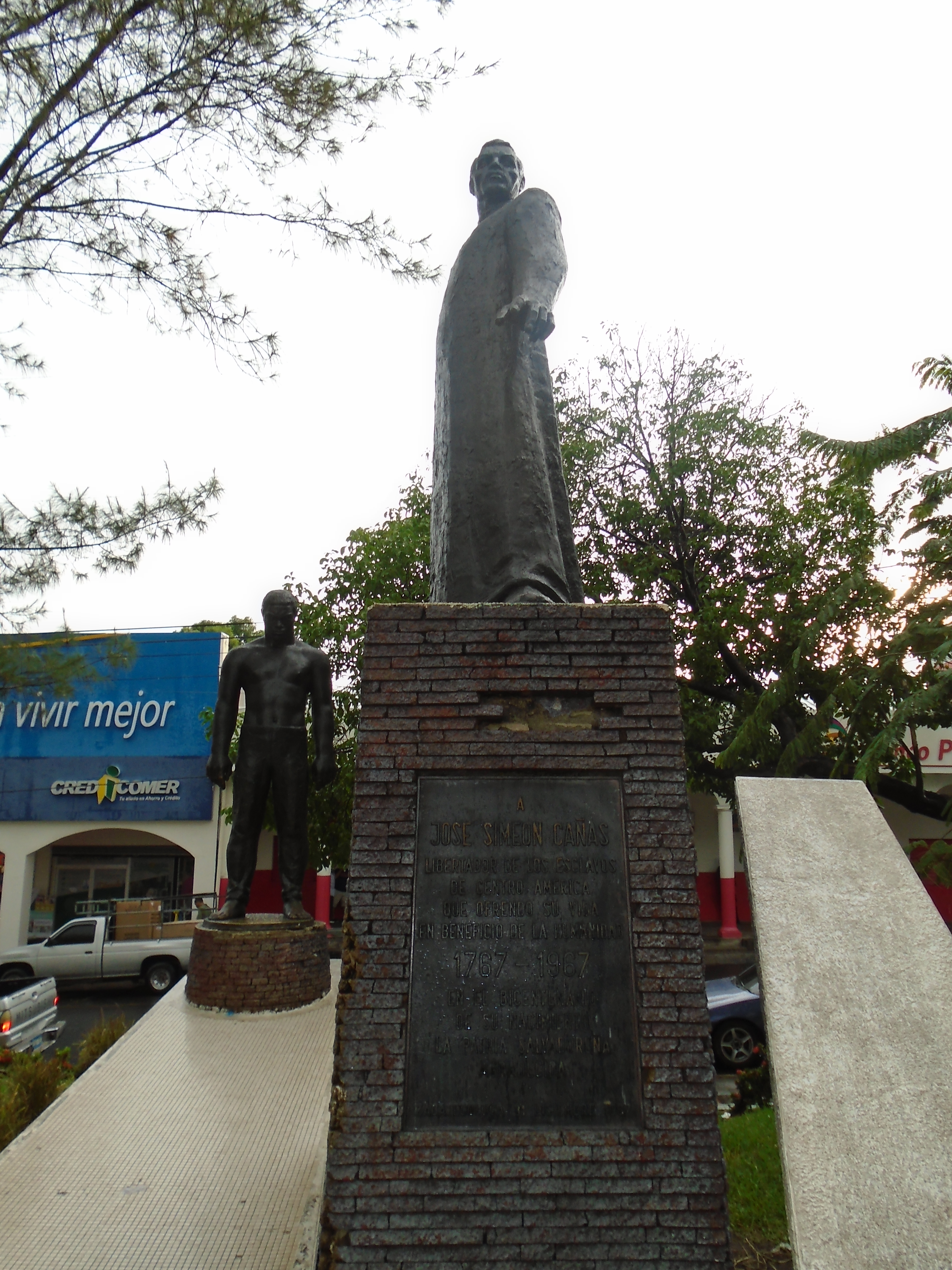
José Simeón Cañas monument.

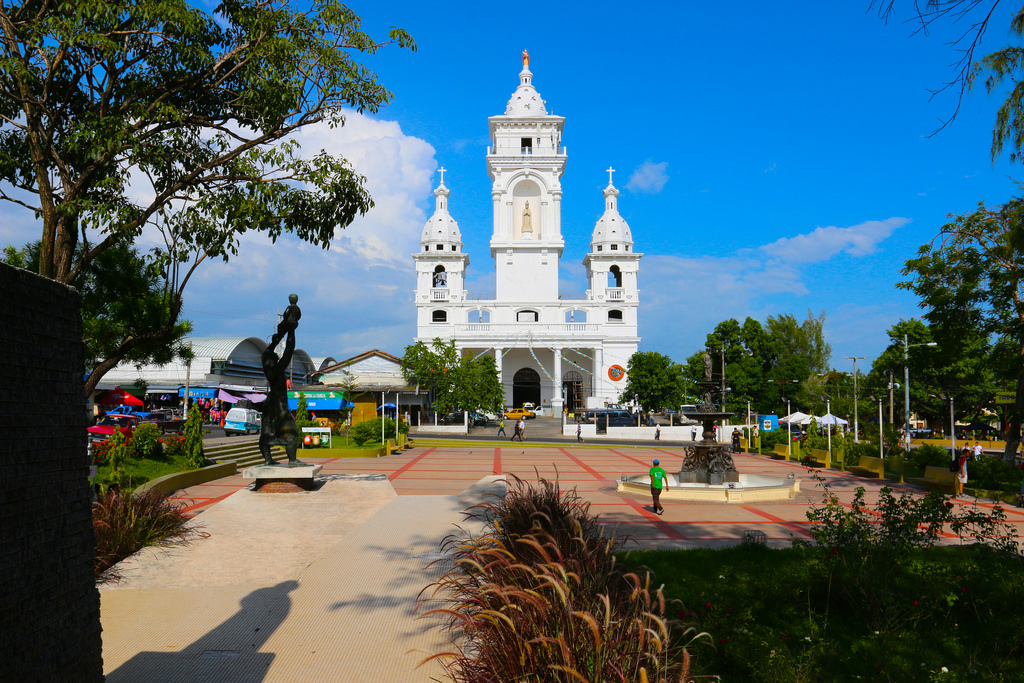
Zacatecoluca's history center.
