= Jon Sobrino =

Spanish Jesuit and theologian (born 1938)

The Reverend Jon Sobrino SJ
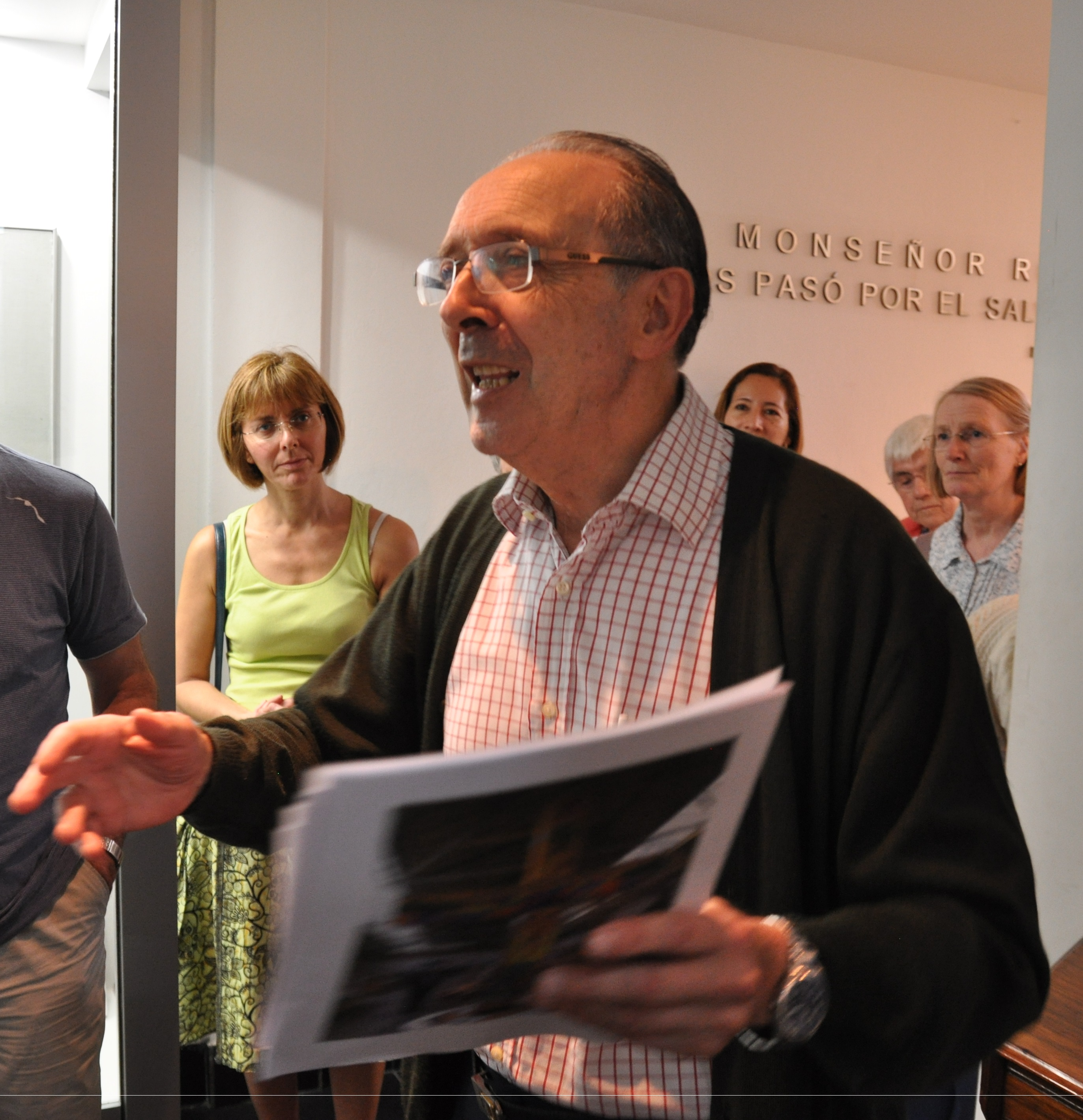
- Sobrino in 2013
- Born: 27 December 1938 (age 87); Barcelona, Spain

Ecclesiastical career
- Religion: Christianity (Roman Catholic)
- Church: Latin Church

Academic background
- Education: Saint Louis University; Hochschule Sankt Georgen, Frankfurt
- Influences: Ignacio Ellacuría; Karl Marx; Jürgen Moltmann; Wolfhart Pannenberg; Karl Rahner

Academic work
- Discipline: Theology
- Sub-discipline: Christology
- School or tradition: Latin American liberation theology
- Institutions: Central American University
- Notable works: Jesus the Liberator (1991); Christ the Liberator (1999)

Jon Sobrino SJ (born 27 December 1938) is a Spanish Jesuit priest and theologian known mostly for his contributions to Latin American liberation theology. He received worldwide attention in 2007 when the Vatican's Congregation for the Doctrine of the Faith issued a notification for what they termed doctrines that are "erroneous or dangerous and may cause harm to the faithful."

== Life ==
Born 27 December 1938 into a Basque family in Barcelona, Sobrino entered the Society of Jesus when he was 18. The following year, in 1958, he was sent to El Salvador. He later studied engineering at Saint Louis University, an American Jesuit university, and then theology at Sankt Georgen Graduate School of Philosophy and Theology in Frankfurt in West Germany for his Doctor of Theology (Dr.theol.) degree. Returning to El Salvador, he taught at the Jesuit-run University of Central America (UCA) in San Salvador, which he helped to found.

On 16 November 1989 he narrowly escaped the murder of the UCA scholars by the Atlacatl Battalion, an elite unit of the Salvadoran Army. By a coincidence, he was away from El Salvador when members of the military broke into the rectory at the UCA and brutally murdered his six fellow Jesuits, Ignacio Ellacuría, Segundo Montes, Juan Ramón Moreno, Ignacio Martín-Baró, Amando López, and Joaquín López y López, as well as their housekeeper Elba Ramos and her 16-year-old daughter Celina Ramos. The Jesuits were targeted for their outspoken work to bring a resolution to the brutal El Salvador Civil War that left about 75,000 men, women, and children dead, mostly civilians.

Investigated by the Vatican throughout his career as a professor of theology, he has remained an outspoken proponent of peace, joining protests in 2008 of the continued training of Latin American military officers in torture techniques at the School of the Americas at Fort Benning.

== Works ==
Sobrino's main works are Jesus the Liberator (1991) and its sequel Christ the Liberator (1999), along with Christology at the Crossroads (1978), The True Church and the Poor (1984), Spirituality of Liberation (1990), The Principle of Mercy: Taking the Crucified People from the Cross (Orbis, 1994), No Salvation Outside the Poor, and Prophetic-Utopian Essays (Orbis, 2008).

== Vatican notification ==
Because of the theological positions he took in his works, Sobrino was the subject of a theological notification; a critique statement and an admonishment by the Vatican and the Congregation for the Doctrine of the Faith in March 2007.

The congregation declared that Sobrino placed too great an emphasis on the human nature of Jesus Christ, downplaying Jesus' divine nature, and that his "works contain propositions which are either erroneous or dangerous and may cause harm to the faithful."

While certain of his teachings were declared false, the congregation did not condemn or censure him, or prohibit him from teaching or lecturing. However, his fellow Jesuit priest Federico Lombardi at the Vatican Press Office hinted at the possibility that his bishop or superior in the order might choose to take action. Archbishop Fernando Sáenz Lacalle of San Salvador reportedly proceeded to bar Sobrino from teaching at Catholic institutions or publishing.

The congregation emphasized in the notification that it was issued as part of its service "to the people of God, and particularly to the simple and poorest members of the Church." They emphasized the people's "right to know the truth ... about Christ" and therefore their corresponding duty to intervene. The notification was premised on Pope Benedict XVI's teaching that "the first poverty among people is not to know Christ."

According to the notification, Sobrino's erroneous propositions concerned: "1) the methodological presuppositions on which the Author bases his theological reflection, 2) the Divinity of Jesus Christ, 3) the Incarnation of the Son of God, 4) the relationship between Jesus Christ and the Kingdom of God, 5) the Self-consciousness of Jesus, and 6) the salvific value of his Death."

At the root of what the Vatican saw as Sobrino's error is his affirmation that "the 'Church of the poor' is the ecclesial 'setting' of Christology and offers it its fundamental orientation." However, the Vatican said that it is "only the apostolic faith which the Church has transmitted through all generations that constitutes the ecclesial setting of Christology and of theology in general."

Retired professor of theology Peter Hünermann of Germany said that the Vatican notification was a "shock" for all theologians, because along with Sobrino "the most distinguished exegetes and systematic theologians – both Catholic and Protestant – stood in the dock". Supported by more than 100 professors of Catholic theology, Hünermann also demanded an "intelligent redevelopment" of the Vatican Congregation for the Doctrine of the Faith, because, as successor organization of the Holy Office, it still had the structure of an "early modern board of censors".

Sobrino's work was reviewed by a number of theologians, including Bernard Sesboüé, José Ignacio González Faus, Javier Vitoria, Carlo Palacio of Belo Horizonte, and Martin Maier, editor of the German Jesuit periodical Stimmen der Zeit. These theologians found no doctrinal errors in Sobrino's works. It is not apparent that their findings were considered by the Congregation for the Doctrine of the Faith.
