= El Calabozo massacre =

1982 event in El Salvador

- Part of the El Salvador Civil War
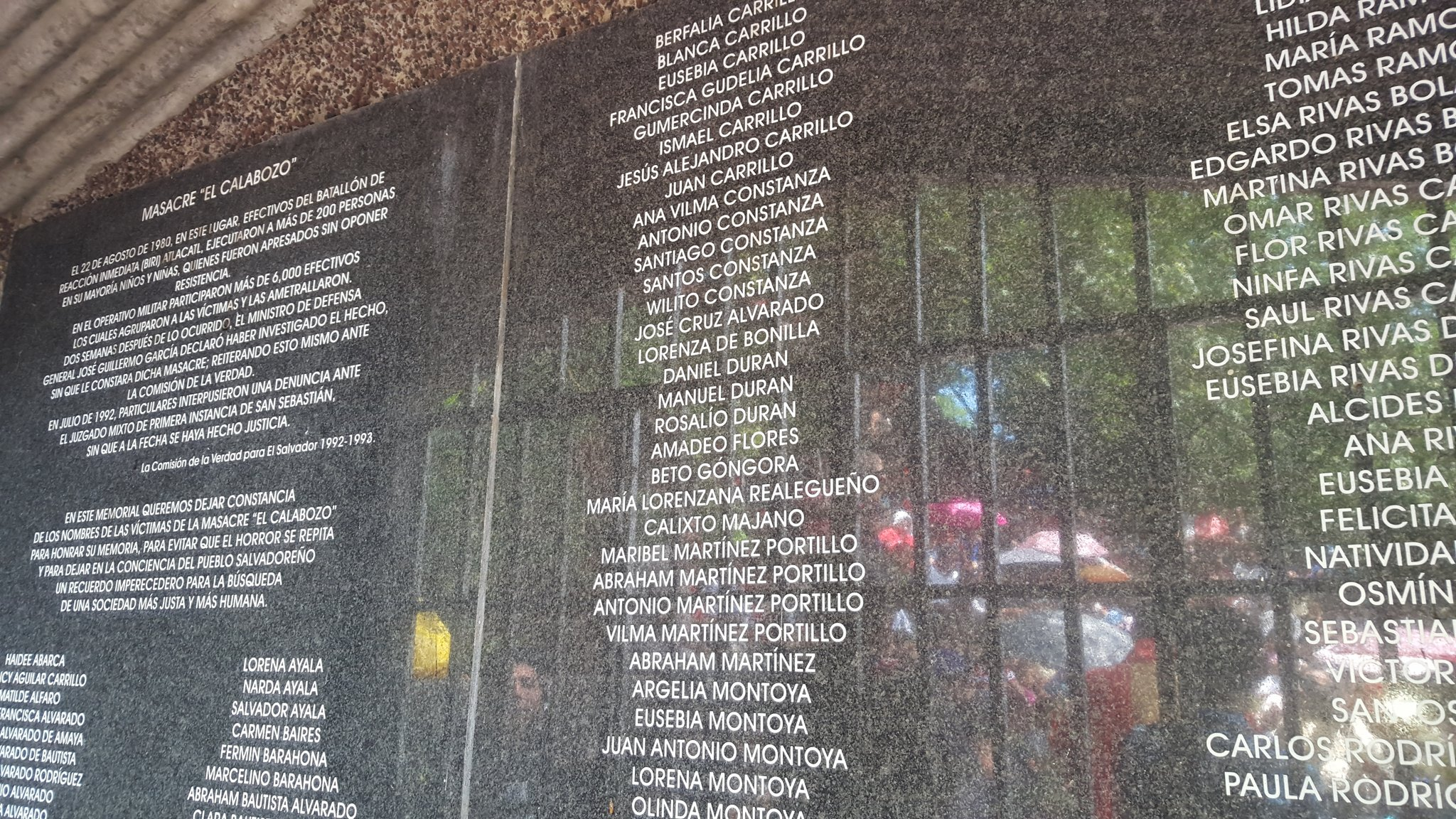
- Location: El Calabozo, San Vicente Department, El Salvador
- Date: 21–22 August 1982
- Deaths: 200+
- Perpetrator: Atlácatl Battalion of the Salvadoran Army

The El Calabozo massacre was an incident during the Salvadoran Civil War on 21–22 August 1982, in which more than two hundred people, including children and elderly, were reportedly killed at El Calabozo by the Atlácatl Battalion of the Salvadoran Army.

In August 1982, the Salvadoran military attacked the San Vicente Department, an area where the rebel Farabundo Martí National Liberation Front was known to have bases. The department was bombed for several days before ground forces advanced, causing many civilians to flee.

On the night of August 21, a group of internally displaced people was overtaken beside the Amatitán River by the Atlácatl Battalion, a US-trained counter-insurgency unit. The Atlácatl Battalion had previously been responsible for the El Mozote massacre, in which 811 captured civilians had been killed in the town of El Mozote At a spot called "El Calabozo" ("The Dungeon"), the battalion surrounded the IDPs and opened fire at close range. The soldiers threw some of the bodies into the river and reportedly threw acid on others, making an exact death toll impossible to confirm, but more than two hundred were reported missing after the incident by surviving family members. The dead included infants and elderly.

The massacre was first publicly reported in The Boston Globe on September 8, 1982. Minister of Defense José Guillermo García stated that the government had investigated the incident and determined that no massacre had taken place. In 1992, survivors filed a complaint with authorities asking for an investigation. Though the Commission on the Truth for El Salvador documented the massacre's existence, the government closed the case in 1993 without charges. As of 2012, the Salvadoran government had not acknowledged the existence of the massacre or prosecuted those responsible.

== See also ==
- List of massacres in El Salvador
