= Segundo Montes, El Salvador =

Community in Morazán Department, El Salvador

Segundo Montes (also called Comunidad Segundo Montes or Ciudad Segundo Montes) is a community in Morazán Department, El Salvador, formed in 1990 by repatriated refugees who had fled the country's civil war. The community was named in memory of Segundo Montes, a Jesuit priest and scholar at the Universidad Centroamericana "José Simeón Cañas" who was murdered by right-wing forces in November 1989 together with five other priests, their housekeeper, and her daughter.

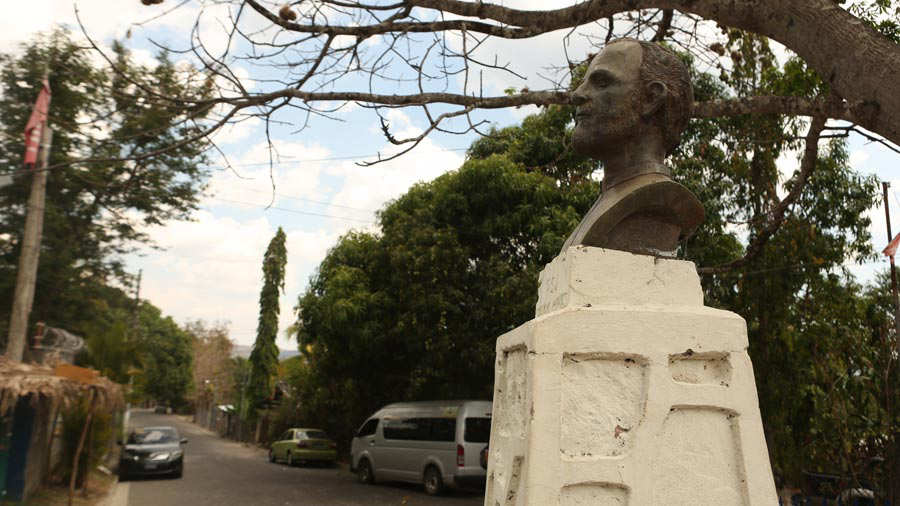
Bust of Segundo Montes, on the community named after him.

When the settlement was first proposed, the national government opposed the return of the refugees, ceding their right to return only after the United Nations intervened on their behalf. Among those who made their home in Segundo Montes was Rufina Amaya, known as the lone survivor of the December, 1981, El Mozote massacre.

In 1991, Ciudad Segundo Montes became a sister city to Cleveland, Ohio, home of Dorothy Kazel and Jean Donovan, two American churchwomen raped and murdered by members of the Salvadoran National Guard in 1980. The sister-city relationship was a joint project among Central American Network, the Salvadoran Association of Ohio, the Commission on Catholic Community Action and the Community Relations Board of the City of Cleveland.

The community's beginnings in a Honduran refugee camp and their return to their homeland were the subject of a 1992 documentary by WHYY-TV of Philadelphia, Pennsylvania. The film was described by Philadelphia Inquirer critic Jonathan Storm as "hopeful," portraying how the town's founders increased local literacy rates "from next to nothing to 85 percent in a nine-year period" and showing the town's establishment while the war still was being waged.

== See also ==
- Segundo Montes
