= Rufina Amaya =

Survivor of the El Mozote massacre

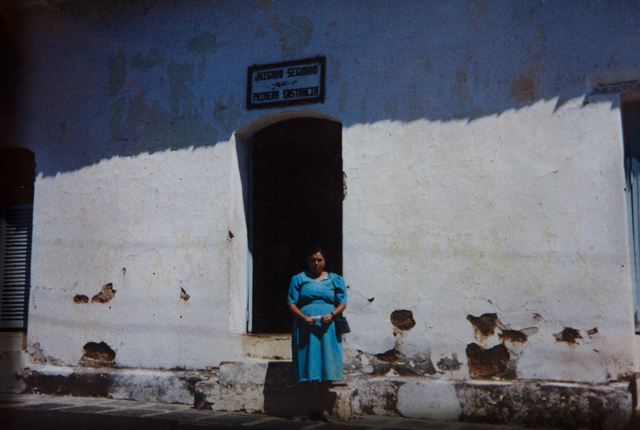
- Rufina Amaya at the door of the San Francisco Gotera court, Morazán, after the presentation of the judicial complaint against the leaders of the Atlacatal Battalion. October 1990
- Born: 1943
- Died: March 6, 2007 (aged 63–64); San Salvador, El Salvador
- Occupation: Lay minister
- Known for: Sole survivor of the El Mozote massacre
- Spouses: Domingo Claros (died 1981) José Natividad (div. 1987)
- Children: 9

Rufina Amaya (1943 – March 6, 2007) was one of the few survivors of the El Mozote massacre on December 11 and 12, 1981, in the Salvadoran department of Morazán during the Salvadoran Civil War. Her testimony of the attacks, reported shortly afterward by two American reporters but called into question by the U.S. journalism community as well as by the U.S. and Salvadoran governments, was instrumental in the eventual investigation by the United Nations Commission on the Truth for El Salvador after the end of the war. The investigation led to the November 1992 exhumation of bodies buried at the site and the commission's conclusion that Amaya's testimony had accurately represented the events.

Hidden in a tree to which she had run while soldiers were distracted, Amaya watched and listened as government soldiers raped women and children, then killed men, women, and children by machine-gunning them, then burning their bodies. While hiding, she prayed to God that if he let her live, she would tell the world what took place there. She kept her promise. Amaya lost not only her neighbors, but also her husband, Domingo Claros, whose decapitation she saw; her 9-year-old son, Cristino, who cried out to her, "Mama, they're killing me. They've killed my sister. They're going to kill me."; and her daughters María Dolores, María Lilian, and María Isabel, ages 5 years, 3 years, and 8 months old. The only one of her children with Claros who was not killed in the massacre was their daughter Fidelia, who was not in the village at the time.

Following the massacre, Amaya became a refugee for a time in the neighboring country of Honduras, where in 1985 she married fellow refugee José Natividad, with whom she had four children, divorcing within two years after the marriage. She returned to El Salvador in 1990 and became a lay minister for the Roman Catholic Church. By March 2000, Amaya was living near the Morazán village of Segundo Montes, Morazán, established by fellow repatriated exiles in memory of Segundo Montes, a Jesuit priest and scholar killed during the war in a mass assassination of priests by government forces at the Universidad Centroamericana "José Simeón Cañas" (UCA).

Amaya died of a stroke in a San Salvador hospital aged 64, on March 6, 2007, following a long illness.
