= Claudia Ivette Canjura de Centeno =

Claudia Ivette Canjura de Centeno was the ambassador from El Salvador to the United States (April 17, 2016 – June 2019) and a Doctor with a specialization in public health.

Sources differ on why she left Washington. It was reported she resigned on June 8, 2019, and also that President Nayib Bukele dismissed her, among other officials, “for allegedly forming a network of administrative nepotism with which Sánchez would have taken over the country's institutions.” Her father, Carlos Canjura, was Secretary of Education under Sánchez.

Before replacing Francisco Altschul who left to become ambassador to Spain, Canjura de Centeno was ambassador to Russia since 2012. She began her foreign service career in 2009 as a representative to Guatemala after spending several years working in health care.

She graduated from the University of El Salvador (UES) and has a master's degree in Public Health from the José Simeón Cañas Central American University (UCA).
