= 1989 murders of Jesuits in El Salvador =

Massacre of civilians by Salvadoran soldiers

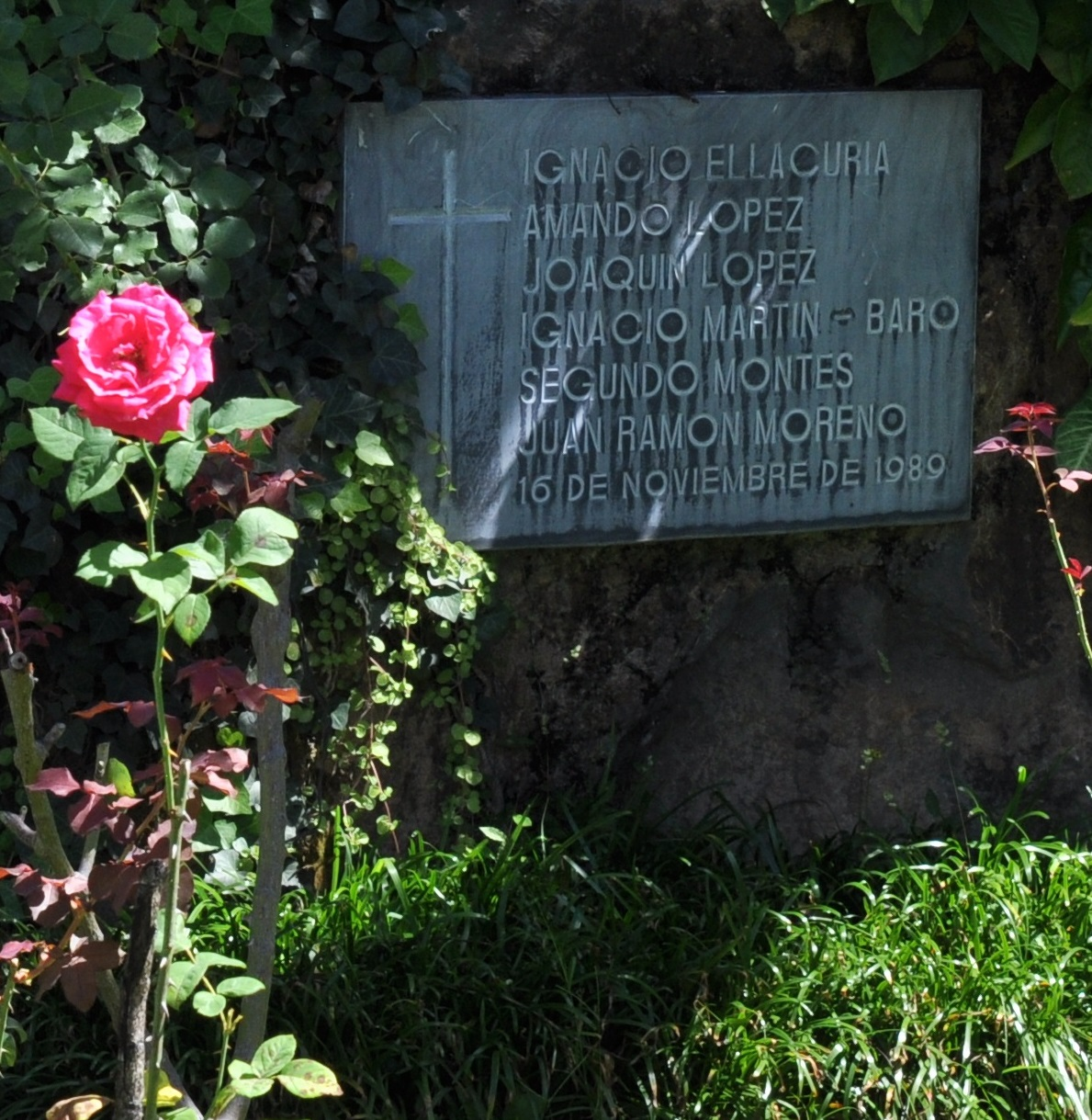
Rose Garden at UCA, El Salvador. The place where Ignacio Ellacuría, Ignacio Martín-Baró, Segundo Montes, Juan Ramón Moreno, Amando López, Joaquín López y López, Elba Ramos y Celina Ramos, were killed on 16 November 1989, by a military platoon.

During the Salvadoran Civil War, on 16 November 1989, Salvadoran Army soldiers killed six Jesuits and two women, the caretaker's wife and daughter, at their residence on the campus of Central American University (known as UCA El Salvador) in San Salvador, El Salvador. Polaroid photos of the Jesuits' bullet-riddled bodies were on display in the hallway outside the chapel, and a memorial rose garden was planted beside the chapel to commemorate the murders.

The Jesuits were advocates of a negotiated settlement between the government of El Salvador and the Farabundo Martí National Liberation Front (FMLN), the guerrilla organization that had fought the government for a decade. The murders attracted international attention to the Jesuits' efforts and increased international pressure for a cease-fire, representing one of the key turning points that led toward a negotiated settlement to the war.

== Background ==
Prior to the Salvadoran Civil War tensions between democratic reformists and the long-standing military dictatorship were rising. Salvador's economy was in a deficit due to the 1973 Oil Crisis and a string of bad agricultural harvests. The old government continued to use its military to repress the population even in the face of mass opposition. On March 24, 1980, Óscar Arnulfo Romero y Galdámez an appointed Archbishop was assassinated during his celebration of Mass by El Salvador's death squads.

In October 1980, the Farabundo Martí National Liberation Front (FMLN) was founded to combat El Salvador's oligarchic military oppression against the people of El Salvador. These leftist guerrillas faced heavy persecution. El Salvador's military viewed opposition to their power as direct communism and a threat to the dictatorship. Priests took a stand for the bloodshed in the streets by calling for social justice. This only put a clear target on their backs. "Be a patriot, kill a Priest," phrases such as these stemmed from propagandist anti-communist sentiment instilled into the radical leadership during the Salvadoran Civil War. The FMLN's initial goal in fighting was to overthrow the radical military oligarchy which changed over the course of the 1980s. They made demands for the demilitarization of the Salvadoran government.

In June 1989, the election of President Alfredo Cristiani enabled the early moves towards reform in El Salvador. The U.S. dropped the claim that the Salvadoran Civil War was an event pertaining to the Cold War rather than an isolated internal struggle. Cristiani was forced to negotiate with the FMLN when they attacked the capital in San Salvador. Despite being fended off by the Salvadoran military, this offensive changed the tide instilling fear that the FMLN was growing too powerful to defeat. The murders of the six Jesuits expedited military aid from the U.S. in support of the FMLN and those they fought for.

== Events ==
Note: All descriptions of events are taken from the Truth Commission's report and the summary of accusations admitted by the Spanish court against the members of the Salvadoran military who were sentenced for the crime.

The Salvadoran army considered the Pastoral Centre of UCA El Salvador to be a "refuge of subversives". Colonel Juan Orlando Zepeda, Vice-Minister for Defence, had publicly accused UCA El Salvador of being the center of operations for FMLN terrorists. Colonel Innocente Montano, Vice-Minister for Public Security, said that the Jesuits were "fully identified with subversive movements." In negotiations for a peaceful solution to the conflict, Jesuit priest and rector of the university Ignacio Ellacuría had played a pivotal role. Many of the armed forces identified the Jesuit priests with the rebels, because of their special concern for those Salvadorians who were poorest and thus most affected by the war.

Members of the Atlácatl Battalion, an elite unit of the Salvadoran Army implicated in some of the most infamous incidents of the Salvadoran Civil War, were a rapid-response, counterinsurgency battalion created in 1980 at the U.S. Army's School of the Americas, which was then located in Panama. On the evening of 15 November, Atlácatl Colonel Guillermo Alfredo Benavides Moreno met with officers under his command at the Military College. He informed them that the General Staff considered the recent rebel offensive "critical", to be met with full force, and that all "known subversive elements" were to be eliminated. He had been ordered to eliminate Ellacuría, leaving no witnesses. The officers decided to disguise the operation as a rebel attack, using an AK-47 rifle that had been captured from the FMLN.

The soldiers first tried to force their way into the Jesuits' residence, until the priests opened the doors to them. After ordering the priests to lie face-down in the back garden, the soldiers searched the residence. Lieutenant Guerra then gave the order to kill the priests. Fathers Ellacuría, Ignacio Martín-Baró, and Segundo Montes were shot and killed by Private Grimaldi. Fathers Amando López and Moreno were killed by Deputy Sergeant Antonio Ramiro Avalos Vargas. The soldiers later discovered Father Joaquín López y López in the residence and killed him as well. Deputy Sergeant Tomás Zarpate Castillo shot housekeeper Julia Elba Ramos and her 16-year-old daughter, Celina Mariceth Ramos; both women were shot again by Private José Alberto Sierra Ascencio, confirming their deaths.

The soldiers removed a small suitcase containing photographs, documents, and $5,000. They then directed machine gun fire at the façade of the residence, as well as rockets and grenades. They left a false flag cardboard sign that read "FMLN executed those who informed on it. Victory or death, FMLN".

== Victims ==
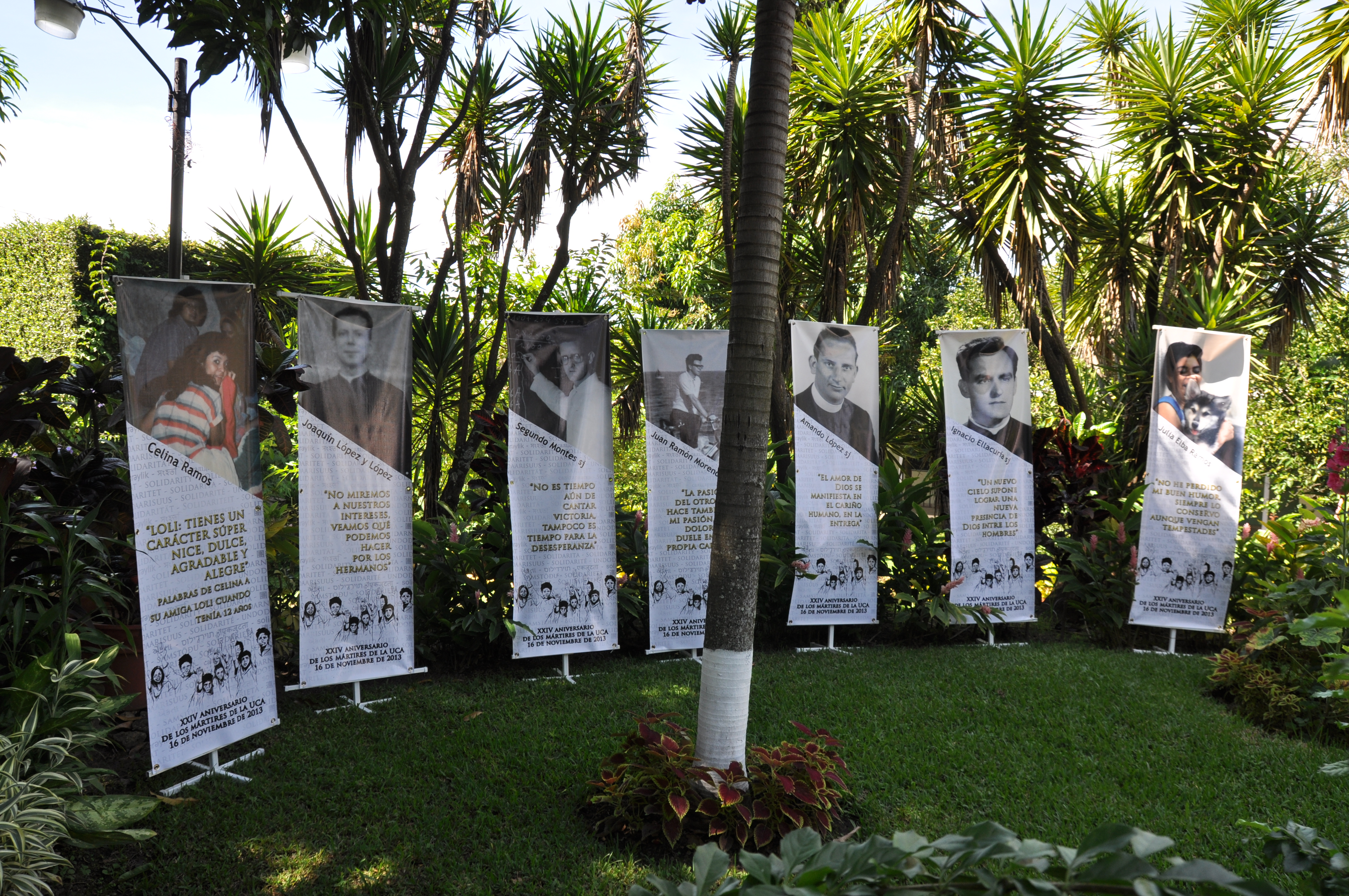
Rose Garden at UCA, El Salvador. The place where the victims were killed on 16 November 1989

Those murdered in the attack were:

- Ignacio Ellacuría Beascoechea, S.J., rector of the university
- Ignacio Martín-Baró, S.J., vice-rector of the university and a leading expert on Salvadoran public opinion
- Segundo Montes, S.J., dean of the department of social sciences
- Juan Ramón Moreno, S.J.
- Joaquín López y López, S.J.
- Amando López, S.J.
- Elba Ramos, their housekeeper, and
- Celina Ramos, her sixteen-year-old daughter

All but Celina Ramos were employees of UCA El Salvador. Another Jesuit resident, Jon Sobrino, was delivering a lecture on liberation theology in Bangkok. He said he had grown accustomed to living with death threats and commented: "We wanted to support dialogue and peace. We were against the war. But we have been considered Communists, Marxists, supporters of the rebels, all that type of thing." When The New York Times described the murdered priests as "leftist intellectuals" in March 1991, Archbishop John R. Quinn of San Francisco objected to the use of that characterization "without qualification or nuance". He offered the paper the words of Archbishop Hélder Câmara: "When I feed the hungry, they call me a saint. When I ask why they have no food, they call me a Communist."

== Reaction ==
The murders attracted international attention and increased international pressure for a cease-fire. It is recognized as a turning point that led toward a negotiated settlement to the war.

The U.S. government, which had long provided military aid to the government, called on President Cristiani to initiate "the fullest inquiry and certainly a rapid one". It condemned the murders "in the strongest possible terms". Senator Claiborne Pell, chair of the Senate Foreign Relations Committee, said: "I am devastated by these cold-blooded murders, which appear intended to silence human rights activity in El Salvador. I appeal most urgently for an end to the fighting and for a cease-fire ... and ask that those responsible for these murders be brought to justice as swiftly as possible." An editorial in The New York Times catalogued a series of similar crimes that had gone unpunished and warned that "What's different this time is America's horrified impatience". It warned that the U.S. Senate would end U.S. aid if the government of El Salvador "cannot halt and will not punish death squads".

House Speaker Tom Foley appointed Representative Joe Moakley to investigate the murders in what came to be known as the Moakley Commission. Moakley's findings revealed that the murders had been ordered at the highest levels of the Salvadoran military and led to a reduction in military aid by the United States to El Salvador and the creation of a United Nations commission.

== Legal proceedings in El Salvador ==
Nine members of the Salvadoran military were put on trial. Only Colonel Guillermo Benavides and Lieutenant Yusshy René Mendoza were convicted. The others were either absolved or found guilty on lesser charges. Benavides and Mendoza were sentenced to thirty years in prison. Both were released from prison on 1 April 1993 following passage of the Salvadoran Amnesty Law by a legislature dominated by anti-guerrilla and pro-military politicians. It was enacted to promote social and political reconciliation in the aftermath of the civil war, but its support came from the political factions most closely allied with the right-wing armed groups identified by the report as responsible for most wartime violations of human rights. The trial's outcome was confirmed by the report presented by the Truth Commission for El Salvador, which detailed how Salvadoran military and political figures concealed vital information in order to shield those responsible for the massacre. The report identified Rodolfo Parker, a lawyer and politician who later led the Christian Democratic Party and became a member of the Legislative Assembly. It said he "altered statements in order to conceal the responsibility of senior officers for the murder."

The Jesuits in El Salvador, led by José María Tojeira, UCA's former rector, continued to work with the UCA's Institute of Human Rights, founded by Segundo Montes, to use the Inter-American Court of Human Rights, to bypass the Salvadoran Amnesty Law of 1993 and expose the role of higher military officers in the murders.

In July 2016, the Supreme Court of El Salvador found the Amnesty Law unconstitutional, citing international human rights law. Benavides returned to prison a few weeks later to serve his sentence.

In May 2017, the Jesuit community in El Salvador asked the Ministry of Justice and Public Security to commute the sentence of Benavides, who had served four years of his thirty-year sentence. They said that he had admitted and regretted his actions and that he posed no danger. Jose Maria Tojeira, head of UCA's Human Rights Institute, called him a "scapegoat" for those who ordered the murders and who remained unpunished.

== Legal proceedings in Spain ==
In 2008, two human rights organizations, the Center for Justice and Accountability and the Spanish Association for Human Rights, filed a lawsuit in a Spanish court, against the former Salvadoran president Alfredo Cristiani and 14 members of the Salvadoran military, alleging their direct responsibility for the 1989 massacre. Judge Eloy Velasco admitted this lawsuit in 2009, on the basis of the principle of universal justice. Neither the Jesuits not the UCA were parties to this lawsuit.

During the course of this judicial process, an unidentified witness confessed to his own participation in the massacre and implicated the High Command of the Salvadoran Military and Cristiani. Judge Velasco's resolution on the demand initially included investigations on the 14 implicated members of the Salvadoran Military, excluding the former Salvadoran president, but including the Military High Command represented by General (Colonel, at that time) René Emilio Ponce (who then was chief of defence of El Salvador). However, this new testimony opened up the investigation into former president Cristiani as well. Evidence made available for journalists included handwritten notes taken during a meeting of the Salvadoran Military High Command at which the massacre was allegedly planned, and both the military's High Command and the country's Executive were probably aware of, if not directly involved in, these planning meetings. Declassified CIA documents later indicated that for many years the CIA knew of the Salvadoran government's plans to murder the Jesuits.

On 30 May 2011, the court ruled against 20 members of the Salvadoran military finding them guilty of murder, terrorism, and crimes against humanity. It ordered their immediate arrest. President Cristiaini was not included in the ruling. According to the substantiation of the ruling, the accused took advantage of an initial war context to perpetrate violations of human rights, with the aggravating character of xenophobia. Five of the murdered scholars were Spanish citizens. The propaganda against them, that prepared the context for the murder, called them leftist neoimperialists from Spain, who were in El Salvador to reinstate colonialism. Those found guilty face sentences that total 2700 years in prison.

The ruling of the Spanish court specifies that the Jesuits were murdered for their efforts to end the Salvadoran civil war peacefully. The planning of the murder started when peace negotiations between the Salvadoran government and the FMLN had broken down in 1988. The leadership of the Salvadoran military were convinced that they could win the war against the FMLN militarily. They interpreted Ignacio Ellacuría's efforts for peace negotiations as an inconvenience that had to be eliminated.

The operation against the Jesuits involved cooperation between several military institutions. It consisted of a psychological campaign to delegitimize the Jesuits in the media, accusing them of conspiracy and cooperation with FMLN; military raids against the university, and the Jesuits' home, in order to map and plan the operation; and finally the massacre, perpetrated by the Atlácatl Battalion.

In August 2011, it was discovered by a human rights organization, The Center for Justice and Accountability that one of the 20 Salvadoran military officers indicted in a Spanish court, "Inocente Orlando Montano Morales", a former government vice minister of public safety, was living in Massachusetts for a decade using his real name. He was subsequently charged with immigration fraud and perjury, resulting in a plea deal with U.S. authorities, before being extradited to Spain in November 2017 to stand trial for his participation of the assassination of Father Ignacio Ellacuría. On May 9, 2019, the Office of the Prosecutor of the National Court in Madrid recommended a prison term of 150 years to be served upon Innocente Montano. The trial of Montano Morales began on June 8, 2020. In September 2020, Morales was convicted of the priests' murders and sentenced to 133 years in prison.

== Recognition ==
On the 20th anniversary of the massacre, President Mauricio Funes awarded the Order of José Matías Delgado, Grand Cross with Gold Star, El Salvador's highest civilian award, to the six murdered priests. Funes knew them personally, considered some of them friends, and credited their role in his professional and personal development.

Several academic chairs and research centers are named for them:

- the "Ignacio Ellacuría" chair at Universidad Iberoamericana in Mexico
- a similar chair at Universidad Carlos III in Madrid, Spain.
- the Ignacio Martín-Baró Fund for Mental Health and Human Rights at Boston College
- the Ignacio Martín-Baró prizes at the University of Chicago
- the Segundo Montes community in Morazán, settled by repatriated refugees, the subject of Segundo Montes' research and activism

Most of these scholars are also credited for lasting contributions to the fields of philosophy, theology and liberation theology (Ellacuría), psychology (Martin-Baró), and social anthropology/migration studies (Montes). Some of their scholarship has been published by UCA Editores and others, but much of their material still remains uncategorized or unpublished.

The murders have inspired activism in the United States against U.S. imperialism from intellectuals such as Noam Chomsky.

== Sainthood ==
On Sunday, August 6, 2023, Archbishop José Luis Escobar Alas announced the opening of the canonization process of the slain Jesuits and their household as well as other victims of the Salvadoran civil war.

== Legacy in the United States ==
The legacy of the UCA martyrs has influenced a range of Jesuit and Ignatian social justice initiatives in the United States and internationally. Among these is the Ignatian Solidarity Network, a U.S.-based Catholic organization founded in 2004 that draws inspiration from the martyrs' integration of faith, intellectual inquiry, and commitment to justice. The martyrs—six Jesuit priests along with their housekeeper and her daughter—were associated with the Universidad Centroamericana José Simeón Cañas (UCA) in El Salvador and were known for their advocacy on behalf of the poor amid the country's civil war. Organizations influenced by their witness, including ISN, emphasize education, social analysis, and public engagement as expressions of Ignatian spirituality and Catholic social teaching.

== See also ==
- Ignatian Solidarity Network (legacy of UCA Martyrs)
- Los Horcones massacre
- Luis Parada
- Óscar Romero
- 1980 murders of U.S. missionaries in El Salvador
