= Atlácatl Battalion =

Former Salvadoran army unit

- Batallón Atlácatl
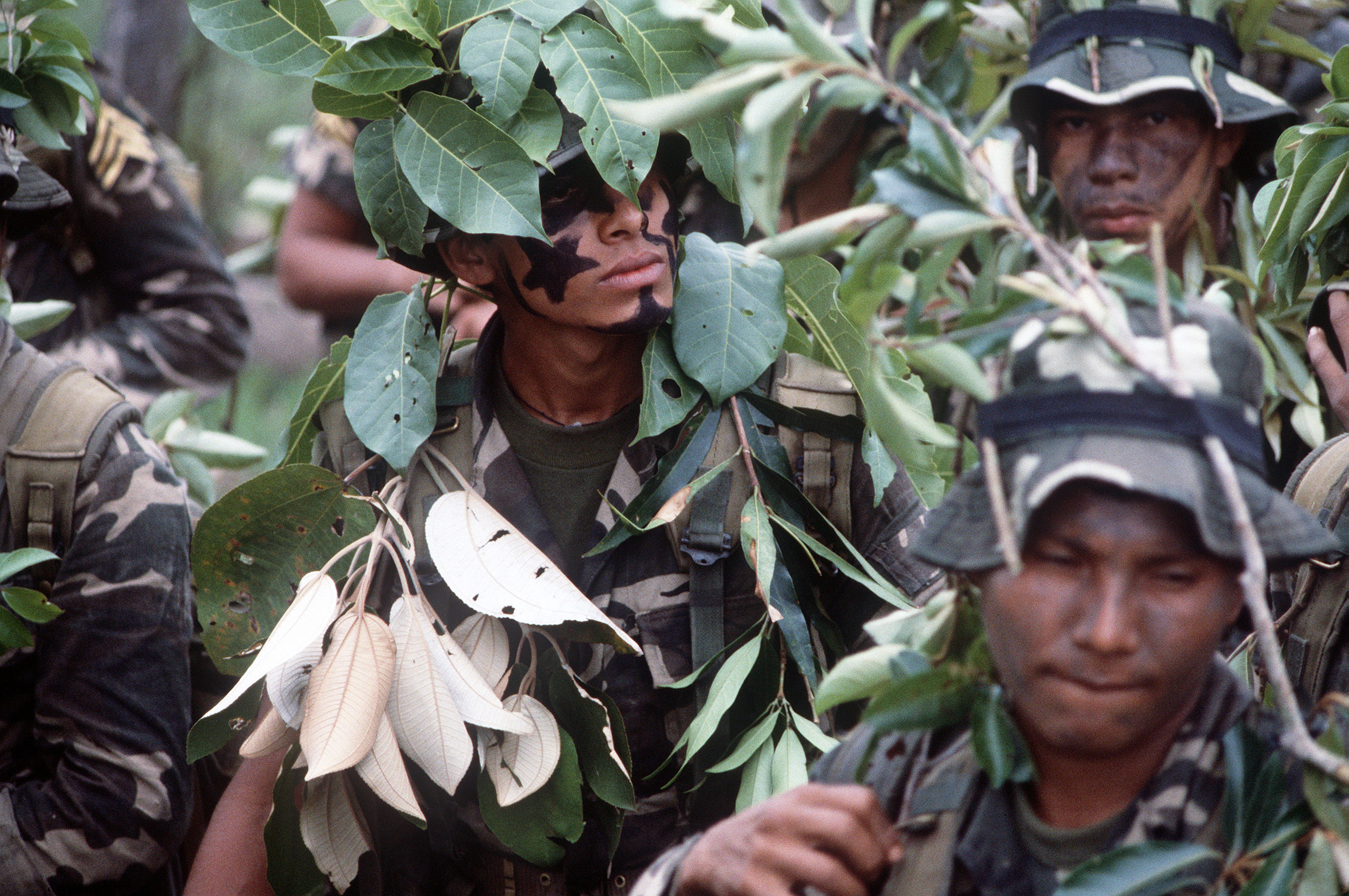
- Active: 1981–1992
- Country: El Salvador
- Branch: Salvadoran Army
- Type: Battalion
- Role: Counter-insurgency
- Size: 2,000
- Part of: Rapid Deployment Infantry Battalions
- Patron: Atlácatl
- Engagements: Salvadoran Civil War

Commanders
- Notable commanders: Domingo Monterrosa Barrios

Insignia
- Identification symbol

The Atlácatl Battalion (Spanish: Batallón Atlácatl) was one of 14 Batallones de Infantería de Reacción Inmediata (BIRI) (English: rapid-response, counter-insurgency battalions) of the Salvadoran Army created in the 1980s. Atlácatl was raised in 1981 and disbanded in 1992. It was implicated in some of the most infamous massacres of the Salvadoran Civil War.

== History ==
The Salvadoran Civil War began on 15 October 1979 with the overthrow of President Carlos Humberto Romero. The military established the Revolutionary Government Junta to govern the country in the wake of the coup, and it established itself to be a "reformist" junta. The United States was covertly involved in the coup and actively supported the junta.

In January 1981, the Farabundo Martí National Liberation Front (FMLN), a left-wing guerrilla group opposed to the junta, began an offensive against the junta and marched on military targets, most notably the Ilopango Airport. In reaction, the United States increased military and economic assistance to the junta and helped establish the Rapid Deployment Infantry Battalions, a network of specialized counter-insurgent army units. The first unit formed was the Atlácatl Battalion in March 1981, followed by the Atonal Battalion in January 1982 and the Belloso Battalion in May 1982. The battalion was named after Atlácatl, a legendary indigenous figure from the Spanish conquest of El Salvador who fought against conquistador Pedro de Alvarado.

The United States sent fifteen counter-insurgent specialists from 7th Special Forces Group to El Salvador in March 1981 to train the newly formed battalion. Weapons, ground vehicles, and helicopters were sent to the battalion, which numbered around 2,000 soldiers.

The battalion was disbanded in 1992 under the terms of the Chapultepec Peace Accords that ended the twelve-year civil war.

== Organization ==
All BIRI were equipped with M16-A1 rifles. They consisted of 7 military units: 5 rifle companies, 1 command and service company, 1 support weapons company with machine-guns, mortars, and recoilless rifles, and 1 reconnaissance squadron.

== Investigation by the Truth Commission for El Salvador ==
In the early 1990s, the Truth Commission for El Salvador was established by the United Nations to investigate war crimes committed during the civil war. The report concluded that the battalion was responsible for the El Mozote massacre, the El Calabozo massacre, and the 1989 murder of six Jesuit priests. The Battalion was also implicated in the killing of around 50 civilians on the banks of the Guaslinga river. Human Rights Watch independently linked the battalion to additional massacres not cited in the UNTC report, including dozens of people killed in Tenancingo and Copapayo in 1983, sixty-eight people killed in Los Llanitos, and three separate killings of civilians in 1989.

== See also ==
- List of massacres in El Salvador

== Bibliography ==
- Betancur, Belisaric; Planchart, Reinaldo Figueredo; Buergenthal, Thomas (1 April 1993). "Report of the UN Truth Commission on El Salvador". derechos.org. United Nations.
- Beverley, John (1982). "El Salvador". Social Text (5). Duke University Press: 55–72. doi:10.2307/466334. JSTOR 466334.
- Goldston, James; Rone, Jemera (1990). A Year of Reckoning: El Salvador a Decade After the Assassination of Archbishop Romero. Human Rights Watch. ISBN 9780929692500.
