= El Mozote =

- Village
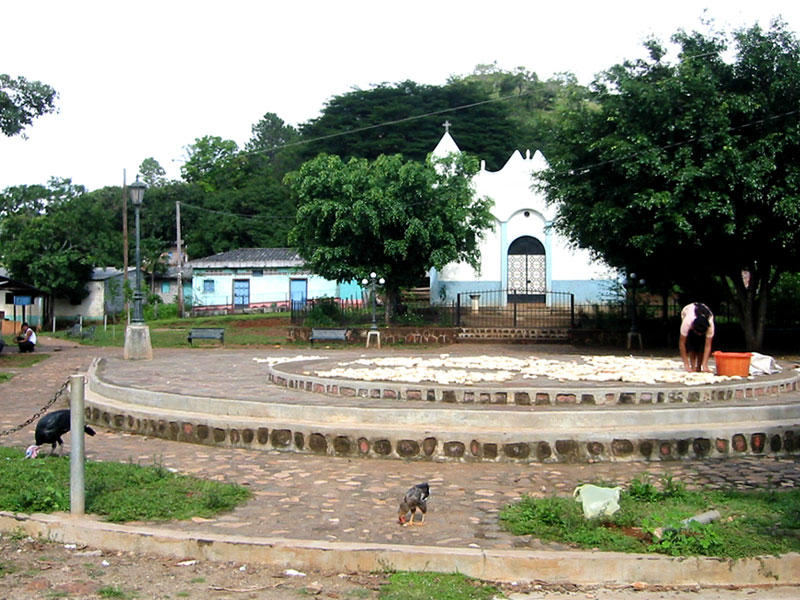
- El Mozote in 2003

- Location within El Salvador
- Coordinates: 13°54′N 88°07′W
- Country: El Salvador
- Department: Morazán
- Municipality: Arambala

El Mozote ([el moˈsote]) is a village in the Morazán Department in El Salvador. It was the site of the El Mozote massacre during the civil war in December 1981 when nearly 1,000 civilians were killed by a Salvadoran Army unit known as the Atlácatl Battalion.

== El Mozote massacre ==
On December 10, 1981, the Atlácatl Battalion entered the village of El Mozote with a plan in mind. The Battalion's mission: to eliminate everyone in the village who stood in their way of capturing 'the Guerrilla,' as the Farabundo Martí National Liberation Front (FMLN) was known. In the lapse of three days every inhabitant of the village was executed. On the fatal day of December 10, soldiers rousted the civilians from their homes and gathered them in the central plaza where they were forced to lie down on the street. Soldiers then brutally kicked them, threatened and seized jewelry and valuables along with accusing the people of belonging to the FMLN. At nightfall, people were ordered to enter their homes and were warned not to step outside or else they would be murdered. The following morning, the citizens were forced outside where they were then divided into groups of men with boys and women with girls and children. Men and older boys were taken to a church and the rest were taken to vacant homes. In the church, the soldiers blindfolded the men and killed them either by decapitation or point-blank gunshots. Many of these men were tortured before being executed. At the same time, women and girls were forced to walk up hillsides where they were first raped before being murdered. Then the soldiers rounded up the children in an empty home where they shot and killed every child. After proceeding with the executions of all the inhabitants, they left obscene writings on the walls prior to burning the homes and the bodies. The soldiers didn't settle with just eliminating the inhabitants, they made sure that the animals belonging to the deceased were killed and burned as well. The “Angels of Hell,” as the Atlácatl Battalion styled themselves, had completed their mission.

== Human rights violations ==
The civil war in El Salvador was a time of desperation and turmoil for the civilians of that small country. There were numerous complaints of human rights violations but a countless number of people did not report the abuse for fear of the military's retaliation. But it was the El Mozote massacre that brought to light the many accusations of human rights violations. The El Mozote case alone demonstrated almost all of the human rights violations that were recorded during the civil war. Due to almost 1000 citizens being killed in a span of three days, the El Mozote massacre came to be known as the most notorious case of human rights violation in the history of El Salvador.

One of the human rights violations made by the massacre was the right to due process and fair trial. The inhabitants of El Mozote were accused of being Guerrilla members and without questioning, they were executed. This was a violation of their human rights according to the United Nations because the citizens were innocent without any link to the Guerrilla but that still did not influence the military's decision to kill every inhabitant. The citizens should have been questioned first about the Guerrilla instead of just being executed. The citizens were also deprived of their safety and well being. According to the soldiers responsible for the killings, all of the inhabitants were protecting the Guerrilla thus, the killing of the inhabitants was justified in their eyes for sake of the country's wellbeing.

During the executions, the Atlácatl Battalion made sure to leave a mark behind with the victims to let the rest of the civilians in El Salvador know to not cross paths with them. The “Angels of Hell” tortured many of the men before murdering them. The military's torture methods were brutal, “Soldiers would dislocate body parts; apply electric shocks, acid burns, and severed limbs: tongues, ears, and gouged eyes.". These torture methods violated the human right of self-defense according to the Truth Commission Report. Torture is defined as "any act by which severe pain or suffering, whether physical or mental, is intentionally inflicted on a person for such purposes as obtaining from him or a third person information or a confession, punishing him for an act he or a third person has committed or is suspected of having committed, or intimidating or coercing him or a third person, or for any reason based on discrimination of any kind, when such pain or suffering is inflicted by or at the instigation of or with the consent of a public official or other person acting in an official capacity". The victims were tied down and left defenseless. Instilling unspoken pain to any human being is a violation of their rights because one is stripping that person of their identity and is inflicting unspoken pain into the victim. It is a violation especially if the victims are innocent and are being induced unnecessary pain. The Universal Declaration of Human Rights states that "No One shall be subjected to torture or cruel, inhumane or degrading treatment or punishment."

Overall, the military violated the most important of human rights, “everyone has the right to life, liberty, and personal security.” The victims’ lives were abruptly taken without any resistance from the civilians. Their right to life and security were stripped without any plausible reason. The killing of defenseless children and babies made the case important for investigators. Babies were murdered ruthlessly at the hands of these men. Women and young girls were raped before being murdered and in the process of those actions, the right to their security vanished. Now all that remained in the ghost town were dead bodies of men, women, young girls, boys, and babies.

== Truth Commission report ==
The United Nations Truth Commission took part in investigating the different acts of human right violations in the civil war in El Salvador and took initiative in investigating the El Mozote massacre. When the Truth Commission began to question the government about the massacre, the government insisted that the massacre never occurred. Due to the government's insistence in denying the case, the Truth Commission knew that the massacre had to be a serious case because the government would not respond for the murders. This encouraged the Truth Commission to continue their investigation even though they were asked to halt the investigations. What they came across with their investigation stunned the whole world.

=== Forensic investigation ===
As soon as the investigators arrived, they immediately started investigating, and they encountered gruesome findings. They had found evidence of 143 skeletal remains; 136 children and seven adults. When examining the bodies they discovered that most of the skulls had gunshot injuries, which were inserted at a high velocity because of the damage to the skulls. This indicated that the victims were shot at point-blank range.

As the forensic investigators kept observing they found evidence of torture on some of the bodies. Many of the victims’ remains showed evidence of stabbing, strangling, and suffocation. These same bodies showed evidence of dislocated limbs and gouged eyes because of the fractures around the eye area. When the investigators entered homes they found that people were gathered in rooms and burned to death. Many of the victims also had gunshot wounds to the head. The investigators also believed that children under ten years old were gathered in a room and cremated then crushed due to the fire destroying the homes.

Unfortunately for the military and for the government, there had been a survivor who was successful in escaping the village. Rufina Amaya, the only survivor, was able to retell the accounts of those horrific days.

== Rufina Amaya ==
Rufina Amaya, the only survivor of El Mozote massacre, was 38 at the time of the killings. With the help of her testimony, the Truth Commission was able to investigate the happenings of those days and bring to light the crime committed by the military. She was able to elude the military's brutality by swift action. Rufina Amaya's four children were all taken away from her before the military proceeded with taking Amaya and 22 other women up to a hill. Amaya recounts how she saw a mountain of dead people stacked on top of each other, and at that moment she hurried to jump in a bush. Amaya was last in the line of women being taken to be executed. Amaya remained in the bush though the night where she heard children and babies screaming in horror. Amaya stated that she heard a child say, "Mama they are killing us!". Amaya then dug a hole where she screamed and then everything went silent. She was able to escape after that night.

After being interviewed, Amaya's testimony made headlines in the Washington Post and the New York Times. After the story of the massacre was published, it made the investigation easier for the Truth Commission because the government could not interfere with the investigations. Also with the testimony of Rufina Amaya, the government and the military officers responsible for the massacre could not deny the genocide. Rufina Amaya provided a great contribution to the investigation of the El Mozote massacre. Amaya's testimony was able to open doors and answer questions that were important to understand the massacre. Amaya died at the age of 64 in 2007.

== Mural ==
To recognize the massacre and honor those who lost their lives, the residents of El Mozote commissioned visual artist Claudia Bernardi to direct a mural project as a way of restoring a sense of unity and community among the people of the village who were impacted by the massacre. The mural was completed on the 25th anniversary of the massacre and was created by the community's children.
