= Segundo Montes =

Spanish Jesuit philosopher and sociologist

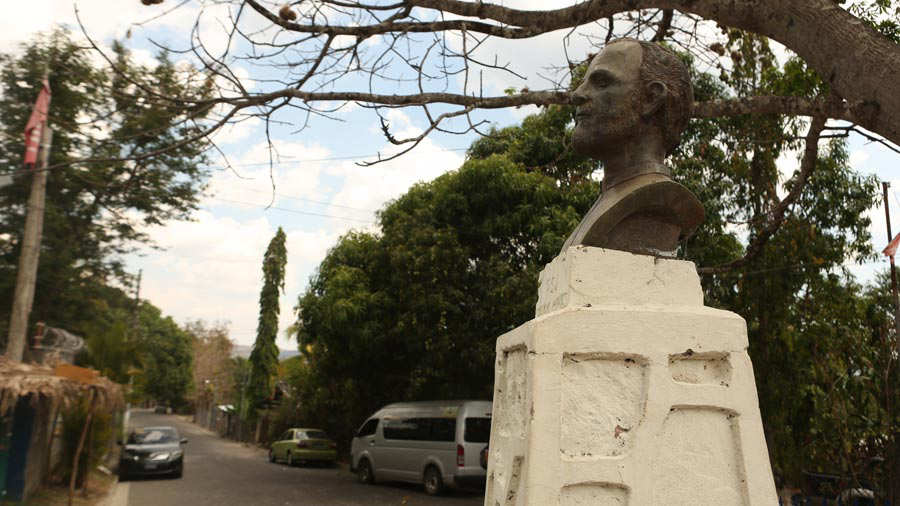
Bust of Segundo Montes, on the community named after him

Segundo Montes SJ (May 15, 1933 – November 16, 1989) was a Spanish scholar, philosopher, educator, sociologist and Jesuit priest who was born in Valladolid, Spain and died in San Salvador, El Salvador. He was one of the victims of the 1989 murders of Jesuits in El Salvador.

== Biography ==
Segundo Montes grew up in Valladolid, Spain, where he also went to secondary school until 1950. On August 15, 1950, he entered the novitiate of the Society of Jesus in Orduña. After a year there, he moved to Santa Tecla in El Salvador under the mentorship of Miguel Elizondo, who described him as an adolescent who hit the football so hard against the wall of the Iglesia El Carmen that he rattled the roof tiles.

When he fulfilled his studies in the novitiate in 1952, he followed the steps of other Jesuit students in Central America and moved to Quito to study classical humanities at the Catholic University. In 1954, he began studies in philosophy, fulfilling his licenciatura (licenciate) in 1957. He then returned to San Salvador to teach at the school Externado San José. In 1960, he returned to university to study theology. He started in Oña, where he lived for a year. He later moved to Innsbruck, where he completed the three remaining years of studies. He was ordained a priest July 25, 1963. He returned to Externado San José as a teacher and was naturalised as a Salvadoran citizen.

Segundo Montes spent most of his time in the school Externado San José or in Universidad Centroamericana "José Simeón Cañas" (UCA). He worked for two periods in Externado; from 1957 to 1960 and 1966 to 1976. He taught physics for many years, and he was responsible for the laboratories in the school. He was a Prefect of Discipline and administrative director. In between 1973 and 1976, he was Rector of Externado San José, which was precisely a moment when the school was going through a deep identity crisis. The consequences of the Second Vatican Council and the Episcopal Conference of Medellín had made Externado San José express a preference for the poor and to prioritize education that contributed to modify the social differences in El Salvador. This sort of discourse was not well received by the Salvadoran elites, who had been traditionally served by Externado San José. Segundo Montes handled this crisis in a constructive way. He was very popular among students and he had many friends. This changed, however, as the political environment in El Salvador became more polarized later in the 1970s. He was not singled out in propagandistic government pamphlets against critical intellectuals until towards the end of his life, when his name started figuring in the lists of Jesuits who were accused of being revolutionaries. His name was commonly the third one after Ignacio Ellacuría and Ignacio Martín-Baró.

Gradually Segundo Montes started assuming more responsibilities in UCA as a lecturer in social sciences. For a period, he worked as a Dean in the Faculty of Natural Sciences. To prepare himself for academia, he travelled to Spain, and in 1978 he completed a PhD in Social Anthropology in Universidad Complutense in Madrid. His dissertation was about "compadrazgo" relationships in El Salvador. His field work included interviews that he performed on weekends in the western part of the country.

He returned to teach Sociology in UCA, and starting in 1980, he was the head of the Department of Political Sciences and Sociology. Between 1978 and 1982, he was a member of the editorial board in the academic journal Estudios Centroamericanos (ECA). He was also a member of the editorial board of the Boletín de Ciencias Económicas y Sociales and the journal Realidad Económico Social. He was a regular contributor to these journals. He also gave many lectures for national institutes, colleges, worker's unions, cooperatives and political parties. He was also a member of the board of directors in UCA. He headed the team of lawyers who put together UCA's law study program. Beginning in 1984, he headed the research project on Salvadoran refugees. Toward the end of the 1980s, he was the managing director of the human rights institution he founded: Instituto de Derechos Humanos de la UCA (IDHUCA), and before his death, he was preparing the program for the master's degree in sociology.

A prolific writer, Segundo Montes left behind a series of articles and books. From 1982 and onwards he wrote at least one book a year. He wrote mostly in Spanish, and so far none of his works originally in Spanish have been translated to English. However, his research on refugees, displaced people and human rights made him well known internationally. He visited Washington, D.C., on repeated occasions, to testify in the corresponding committees in the United States Congress, to defend the rights of Salvadoran refugees. His last trip to Washington was in early November 1989. In one of the halls of Congress, the organisation CARECEN (an organisation for the assistance of refugees) granted him a prize for defending the rights of Salvadorans.

== Social anthropology ==
Segundo Montes did research and wrote on social stratification, land ownership, the possibilities for democracy and the military. His work on these issues is still a dominant influence on the theoretical frameworks employed by researchers to analyse Salvadoran society. His work is referenced in studies of power distribution and the effects of emigration on Salvadoran society. His published articles included an analysis of economic, political, and other motives for Salvadoran emigration to the United States. It addressed claims by the United States government that Salvadoran immigrants were economic refugees who therefore did not qualify for political asylum.

The political implications of Montes' commitment to his ideas met strong opposition from the conservative religious and political forces in El Salvador. This opposition led to Montes' murder by the Salvadoran Army in 1989 at his residence in UCA along with five other fellow Jesuit priests (among them Ignacio Ellacuría and Ignacio Martín-Baró) and two employees. Their murders marked a turning point in the Salvadoran civil war (see History of El Salvador). It increased international pressures on the Salvadoran government to sign the Chapultepec Peace Accords with the guerrillas.

== See also ==
- Segundo Montes, Morazán — a community established by former refugees, in memory of Montes

== Bibliography ==
- Some publications and references
