= El Mozote massacre =

Event during the Salvadoran Civil War (1981)

Coordinates: 13.9°N 88.113°W

- Part of the Salvadoran Civil War
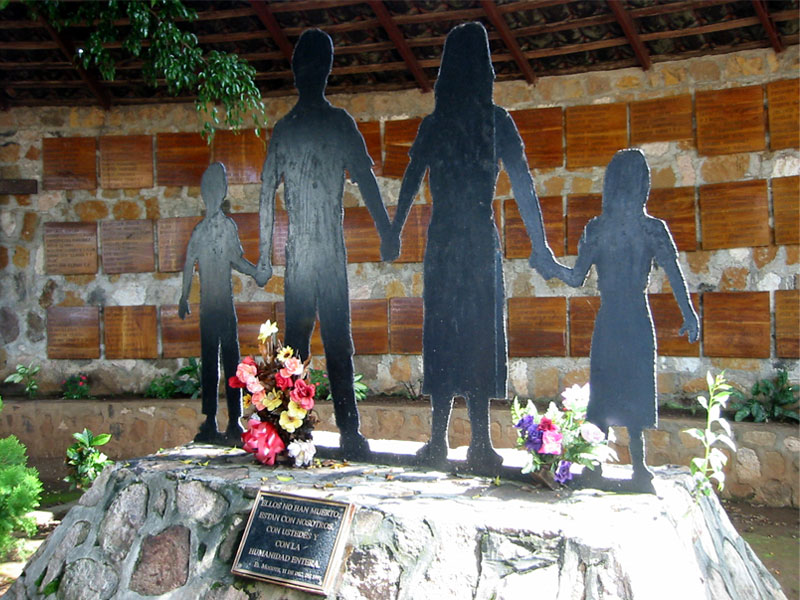
- The memorial at El Mozote
- Location: El Mozote, El Salvador
- Date: December 11, 1981; 44 years ago
- Target: Civilian residents of El Mozote and neighbouring villages
- Attack type: Shooting, grenades, decapitation, mass rape
- Deaths: 800–1,000
- Perpetrator: Salvadoran Army: Atlácatl Battalion

The El Mozote massacre took place in and around the village of El Mozote in the Morazán Department of El Salvador on December 11 and 12, 1981, during the Salvadoran Civil War, when the Salvadoran Army killed more than 811 civilians. The army had arrived in the village on the 10th, following clashes with guerrillas in the area. The Salvadoran Army's Atlácatl Battalion, under the orders of Domingo Monterrosa, was responsible for the massacre.

In December 2011, the government of El Salvador apologized for the massacre, the largest in the Americas in modern times.

== Background ==
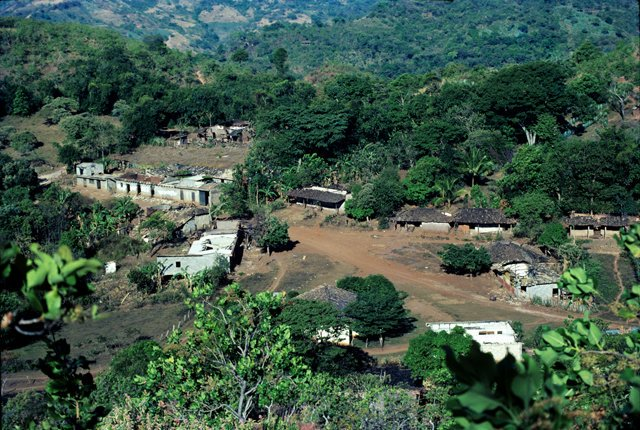
The caserío of El Mozote in 1980, before the massacre

In 1981, various left-wing guerrilla groups coalesced into the Farabundo Martí National Liberation Front to do battle against El Salvador's military dictatorship, the Revolutionary Government Junta of El Salvador.

Prior to the massacre, unlike many villages in the area, El Mozote had a reputation for neutrality. While many of its neighbors were largely Catholic, and were therefore often influenced by liberation theology and sympathetic to the guerrillas, El Mozote was largely Evangelical Protestant. The village had sold some supplies to the guerrillas but it was also "a place where the guerrillas had learned not to look for recruits". The people residing in the village maintained a low commercial relationship with guerrillas for their own safety, but did not ideologically associate with them due to the people's identity of being evangelical Christians.

Prior to the massacre, the town's wealthiest man, Marcos Díaz, had gathered the citizens in order to warn them that the army would soon pass through the area in a counterinsurgency operation, but he had been assured that the town's residents would not be harmed if they remained in place. Concerned that fleeing the town would cause them to be mistaken for guerrillas, the townspeople chose to stay and they also extended an offer of protection to peasants from the surrounding area, who soon flooded the town.

== Massacre ==
In his 1994 book, The Massacre at El Mozote, American journalist Mark Danner compiled various reports in order to reconstruct an account of the massacre:

=== December 10 ===
On the afternoon of December 10, 1981, units of the Salvadoran Army's Atlácatl Battalion, which was created in 1981 with US government funding and military training, arrived at the remote village of El Mozote after a clash with guerrillas in the vicinity. The Atlácatl was a "rapid deployment infantry battalion" specially trained for counter-insurgency warfare, and led by Domingo Monterrosa. It was the first unit of its kind in the Salvadoran armed forces, and was trained by United States military advisors. Its mission, Operación Rescate ("Operation Rescue"), was to eliminate the rebel presence in a small region of northern Morazán where the FMLN had two camps and a training centre.

El Mozote consisted of about 20 houses on open ground around a square. Facing onto the square was a church and, behind it, was a small building which was known as "the convent". The priest used it to change into his vestments when he came to the village to celebrate Mass. Near the village was a small schoolhouse.

Upon their arrival in the village, the soldiers discovered that, in addition to being filled with its residents, the village was also filled with campesinos who had fled from the surrounding area and sought refuge in it. The soldiers ordered everyone to leave their houses and go into the square. They made people lie face down and searched them and questioned them about the guerrillas. They then ordered the villagers to lock themselves in their houses until the next day and warned them that anyone who came out would be shot. The soldiers remained in the village during the night.

=== December 11 and 12 ===
Early the next morning, the soldiers reassembled the entire village in the square. They separated the men from the women and children, divided them into separate groups and locked them in the church, the convent, and various houses.

During the morning, they proceeded to interrogate, torture, and execute the men in several locations. Around noon, they began taking the women and older girls in groups, separating them from their children and murdering them with machine guns after raping them. Girls as young as 10 were raped, and soldiers were reportedly heard bragging about how they especially liked the 12-year-old girls. Finally, they killed the children, at first by slitting their throats, and later by hanging them from trees; one child killed in this manner was reportedly two years old. After killing the entire population, the soldiers set fire to the buildings.

The soldiers remained in El Mozote that night but, the next day, went to the village of Los Toriles and carried out a further massacre. Men, women, and children were taken from their homes, lined up, robbed, and shot, and their homes then set ablaze.

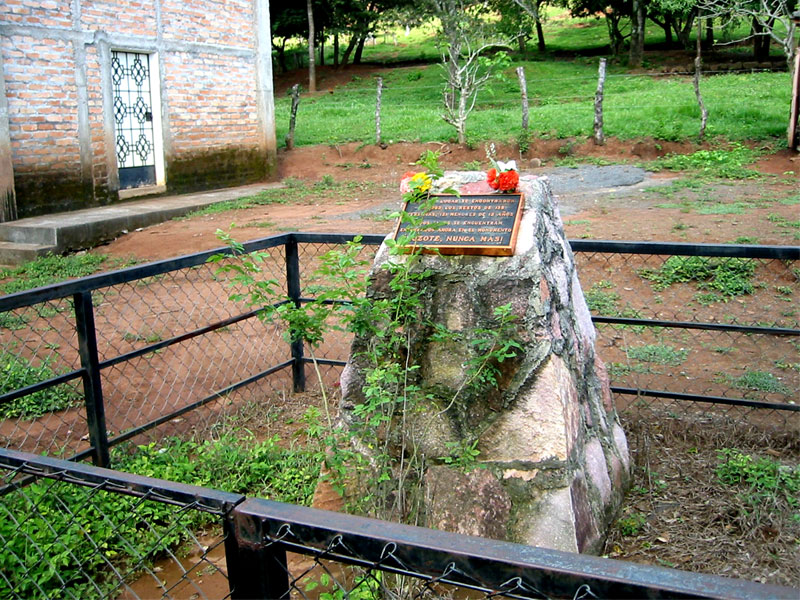
The site of the old church

== Initial reports and controversy ==
News of the massacre first appeared in the world media on January 27, 1982, in reports published by The New York Times and The Washington Post. Raymond Bonner wrote in The New York Times of seeing "the charred skulls and bones of dozens of bodies buried under burned-out roofs, beams, and shattered tiles". The villagers gave Bonner a list of 733 names, mostly children, women, and elderly, all of whom, they claimed, had been murdered by government soldiers. In response to the reporting, the Reagan White House went into overdrive behind the scenes, trying to convince as many influential reporters as possible that the stories were bogus, or that the Farabundo Martí National Liberation Front (FMLN) rebels had staged the massacre. The N.Y. Times ultimately yanked Bonner out of El Salvador and reassigned him to a business beat—although the newspaper never acknowledged a single error in Bonner’s reporting.

Alma Guillermoprieto of The Washington Post, who visited the village separately a few days later, wrote of "dozens of decomposing bodies still seen beneath the rubble and lying in nearby fields, despite the month that has passed since the incident... countless bits of bones—skulls, rib cages, femurs, a spinal column—poked out of the rubble".

Both reporters cited Rufina Amaya, a witness who had escaped into a tree during the attack. She told the reporters that the army had killed her husband and her four children (the youngest of whom was eight months old) and had then lit the bodies on fire.

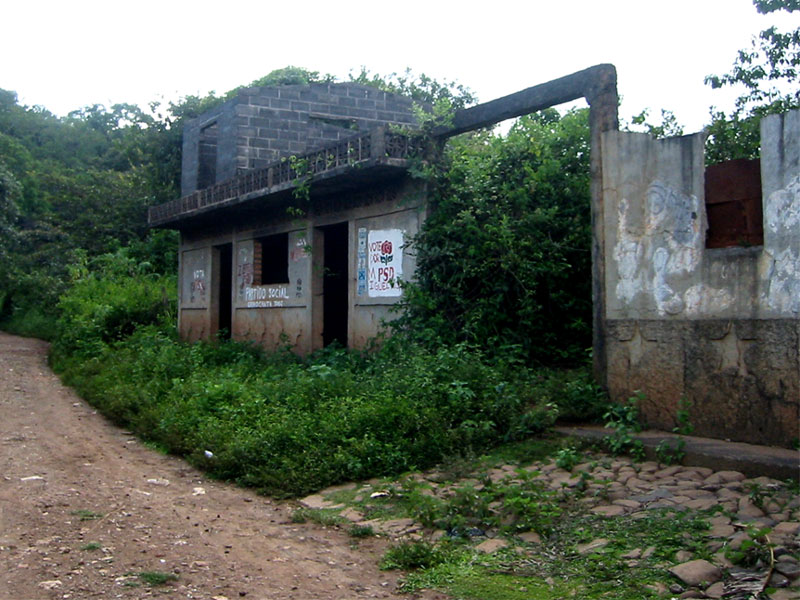
Ruins of a burned building

Salvadoran Army and government leaders denied the reports and officials of the Reagan administration called them "gross exaggerations". The Associated Press reported that "the U.S. Embassy disputed the reports, saying its own investigation had found... that no more than 300 people had lived in El Mozote." Edward S. Herman has argued that the coverage of the massacre has been biased.

The conservative organization Accuracy in Media accused the Times and Post of timing their stories to release them just before the congressional debate. Five months later, Accuracy in Media devoted an entire edition of its AIM Report to Bonner in which its editor Reed Irvine declared, "Mr. Bonner had been worth a division to the communists in Central America." Assistant Secretary of State for Inter-American Affairs Thomas O. Enders attacked Bonner and Guillermoprieto before a Senate committee, stating that there had been a battle between guerrillas and the army, but "no evidence could be found to confirm that government forces systematically massacred civilians." Enders also repeated the claim that only 300 people had lived in El Mozote, and it was impossible for the death toll to have reached that reported in the Times and Post stories.

On February 8, Elliott Abrams, assistant secretary of state for human rights and humanitarian affairs, told the committee that "it appears to be an incident that is at least being significantly misused, at the very best, by the guerrillas."

In February, in an editorial, "The Media's War", The Wall Street Journal criticized Bonner's reporting as "overly credulous" and "out on a limb". In Time magazine, William A. Henry III wrote a month later, "An even more crucial if common oversight is the fact that women and children, generally presumed to be civilians, can be active participants in guerrilla war. New York Times correspondent Raymond Bonner underplayed that possibility, for example, in a much-protested January 27 report of a massacre by the army in and around the village of [El] Mozote." The first U.S. Ambassador to El Salvador of Ronald Reagan's presidency, Deane R. Hinton, called Bonner an "advocate journalist". Bonner was recalled to New York in August and later left the paper.

Although attacked less vigorously than Bonner, Guillermoprieto was also a target of criticism. A Reagan official wrote a letter to the Post stating that she had once worked for a communist newspaper in Mexico, which Guillermoprieto denied.

=== Rufina Amaya's account ===
Rufina Amaya was a Salvadoran woman who tragically became a symbol of the brutalities of the Salvadoran Civil War. Rufina Amaya was one of the few survivors of the El Mozote massacre. Her husband and four children were among those killed.

Her account details how on the day leading up to 10 December 1981, "Everything was closer every day, louder every day, and finally, by that day, the people were hiding in their houses." She explains how when the Atlácatl men arrived they were armed with M16s and shouted, "Salgan!" ("Get out here!") They walked out in the twilight hesitantly and did not know what was happening.

The soldiers cursed the citizens of El Mozote out and herded them into the center of the town with the butts of their rifles. Rufina Amaya, Domingo Carlos (her husband), Marta Lilián (3 years old), Cristino (9 years old), Maria Dolores (5 years old), and Maria Isabel (8 months old) emerged outside and were told like everyone else to lie face down and consequently were pushed down into the dirt. The sound of children crying and soldiers giving orders was all you could hear in the darkness. People would be kicked on the ground and subsequently asked questions about the "guerrillas." The soldiers thought the people of El Mozote were hiding these guerrillas in their town and were against the government of El Salvador.

Rufina said, "They were very abusive. We couldn't do anything. They all had guns. We had to obey." She thought they, "were sentenced to death right there," in that moment. Finally, they were ordered to stand up and return to their houses. The soldiers said they didn't want to see, "even so much as their noses" poke outside of the house. Amaya explains how the houses were packed full of people and the wailing children made the conditions even worse. The soldiers in the center of the town were singing and laughing as they shot their guns into the sky. The children in the house were hungry and afraid and "we could do nothing for them."

The soldiers again ordered the citizens outside and told them to "Form lines! Men and older boys over here! Women and children over there!" The soldiers looked them up and down as a helicopter arrived. Men were ordered into the church and the women and children were crowded into the house of Alfredo Marquez. The helicopter then took off and left.

Rufina could hear shouting from the church. They could hear the men yelling, "No! No! Don't do this to us! Don't kill us!" She and her eldest son looked out the window to see what was going on and the soldiers were leading groups of men out of the church. She saw her husband try to escape as he was led out, but there was nowhere to go. Rufina's husband was shot with burst rounds of M-16s. Where they lay the soldiers brought out machetes and beheaded them with strong blows to the backs of their necks. Rufina hugged her children as she cried and her son was shouting, "They killed my father!" Many men from the church were interrogated throughout the night and at 8 o'clock many men were decapitated after being interrogated.

The next morning, groups of 10 men were continually led to a hill known as El Pinalito. In the distance, Rufina could hear gunshots from the hill and only the soldiers would return. "All morning you could hear the shots, the crying, and the screaming."

Later that day, soldiers came back and said, "Now it's your turn, women." Younger women and girls were led out first and led to the hills of El Chingo and La Cruz. From the house, Rufina could hear the screams of the women who were led to the hills where they were raped.

The soldiers came back from the hills and began to separate women and children. They would take groups of women, one after another. Rufina was found in the last group of women. She fought against the soldiers who were taking her away from her 4 children. The women were marched down the main streets and could see houses burning and blood on the ground. They were led to the house of Israel Marquez and the women at the front of the line screamed because they saw pools of blood on the floor and piles of bloody corpses. Women were heard screaming, "There are dead people! They're killing people!" The women struggled and the soldiers said, "Don't cry, women. Here comes the devil to take you."

At this moment, as Rufina felt death upon her, fell to her knees asking, "God to forgive my sins." She explained how she was at the feet of the soldiers "between a crab-apple and a pine tree." She thinks this is how she was saved. With all the commotion going on around her, the soldiers lost track of her and she crawled between the trees and hid. She says, "I couldn't move, couldn't even cry. I had to remain absolutely still and silent. She witnessed the women grabbing each other and led into the house where she then heard shots and screams. Rufina continued to hear the cries of terror, the screaming, the begging, and the shooting.

Rufina hid in the trees as the houses were burned to the ground. The soldiers at this moment she heard contemplating what to do with the children. Some of the soldiers were against killing the kids, but the others said, "We have orders to finish everyone and we have to complete our orders. That's it." The soldiers felt that the guerrilla notion would grow up in the children eventually to the point where the children would become the guerrillas.

Later that night, Rufina began to hear cries from the house where the children were. She could hear her son Cristino crying, "Mama Rufina, help me! They're killing me! They killed my sister! They're killing me! Help me!" Rufina didn't want to hear the cries so she crawled away into a bush. She dug a little hole for her face so she could cry and not be heard. As the night went on, the soldiers were ordered to burn the houses and the church to the ground. She witnessed the buildings go up in flames and screams from inside the building of the people who were still alive in some capacity. Where she first escaped and lay, soldiers thought they saw a woman and fired rounds into the area she used to be. She lay still all night making sure the soldiers would not hear or see her. She witnessed everything that went down and finally, the soldiers left after massacring El Mozote.

== Later investigation ==
On October 26, 1990, a criminal complaint was filed against the Atlácatl Battalion for the massacre by Pedro Chicas Romero of La Joya. Romero had survived the massacre himself by hiding in a cave above the town. When Romero filed the complaint with the Court of the First Instance in the San Francisco Gotera, he used Rufina Amaya, sole survivor of the El Mozote Massacre, as his witness.

In 1992, as part of the peace settlement established by the Chapultepec Peace Accords signed in Mexico City on January 16 of that year, the United Nations-sanctioned Truth Commission for El Salvador investigating human rights abuses committed during the war, supervised the exhumations of the El Mozote's remains by the Argentine Forensic Anthropology Team (EAAF), beginning November 17. The excavation confirmed the previous reports of Bonner and Guillermoprieto that hundreds of civilians had been killed on the site.

The Salvadoran minister of defense and the chief of the armed forces joint staff informed the truth commission that they had no information that would make it possible to identify the units and officers who participated in Operación Rescate. They claimed that there were no records for the period. The truth commission stated in its final report:

There is full proof that on December 11, 1981, in the village of El Mozote, units of the Atlácatl Battalion deliberately and systematically killed a group of more than 200 men, women and children, constituting the entire civilian population that they had found there the previous day and had since been holding prisoner... there is [also] sufficient evidence that in the days preceding and following the El Mozote massacre, troops participating in "Operation Rescue" massacred the non-combatant civilian population in La Joya canton, in the villages of La Rancheria, Jocote Amatillo y Los Toriles, and in Cerro Pando canton.

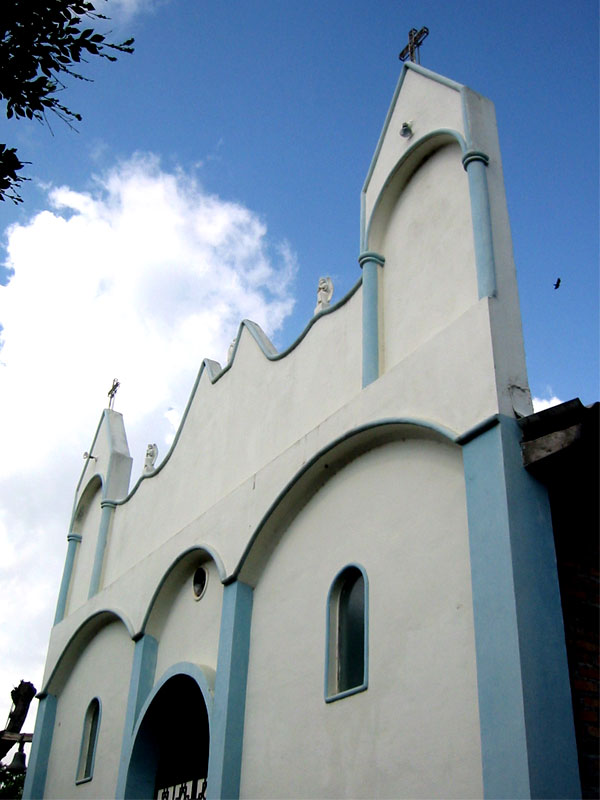
The newly rebuilt church in El Mozote

In 1993, El Salvador passed an amnesty law for all individuals implicated by UN investigations, which effectively exempted the army from prosecution. That year, Danner published an article in the December 6 issue of The New Yorker. His article, "The Truth of El Mozote", caused widespread consternation, as it rekindled the debate regarding the United States' role in Central America during the violence-torn 1970s and 1980s. He subsequently expanded the article into a book, The Massacre at El Mozote (1994). In a prefatory remark, Danner wrote:

That in the United States it came to be known, that it was exposed to the light and then allowed to fall back into the dark, makes the story of El Mozote—how it came to happen and how it came to be denied—a central parable of the Cold War.

In 1993, a special state department panel that examined the actions of U.S. diplomats vis-à-vis human rights in El Salvador concluded that "mistakes were certainly made... particularly in the failure to get the truth about the December 1981 massacre at El Mozote." In his study of the media and the Reagan administration, On Bended Knee, U.S. author Mark Hertsgaard wrote of the significance of the first reports of the massacre:

What made the Morazan massacre stories so threatening was that they repudiated the fundamental moral claim that undergirded US policy. They suggested that what the United States was supporting in Central America was not democracy but repression. They therefore threatened to shift the political debate from means to ends, from how best to combat the supposed Communist threat—send US troops or merely US aid?—to why the United States was backing state terrorism in the first place.

A later court decision overturned the amnesty for defendants suspected of "egregious human rights violations" but attempts by Salvadoran lawyers to reopen the case repeatedly failed.

== Legacy ==
On March 7, 2005, the Inter-American Commission on Human Rights of the Organization of American States reopened an investigation into the El Mozote massacre based on the evidence found by the Argentine forensic anthropologists. As of December 2011, activists continued to lobby the Inter-American Court of Human Rights to hear the case.

In a January 2007 report in The Washington Post, a former Salvadoran soldier, José Wilfredo Salgado, told of returning to El Mozote several months after the massacre and collecting the skulls of the youngest victims, whose remains were exposed by recent rains, for "candleholders and good-luck charms".

In December 2011, the Salvadoran government formally apologized for the massacre, in a ceremony in the town. Foreign Minister Hugo Martinez, speaking on the government's behalf, called the massacre the "blindness of state violence" and asked for forgiveness.

In October 2012, the Inter-American Court of Human Rights ordered El Salvador to investigate the El Mozote massacre and bring those responsible to justice. The court ruled that an amnesty law did not cover the killings.

On June 2, 2019, newly sworn in President of El Salvador, Nayib Bukele, ordered the removal of Colonel Domingo Monterrosa's name from the Third Infantry Brigade barracks in San Miguel. The United Nations blamed Colonel Monterrosa for ordering the El Mozote massacre.

In November 2021, the Bukele administration proposed a Foreign Agents Law that would require individuals and organizations that receive funding from sources outside of El Salvador to register as foreign agents. Human rights organizations such as Cristosal, an advocate for justice in the El Mozote case, warned that the adoption of such a bill would threaten the operation of human rights groups, labeling them as “foreign agents” and slowing their ability to investigate the happenings of the El Mozote massacre.

=== 2016 reopening of inquiry ===
In 2016, Judge Jorge Guzmán reopened the judicial inquiry into the massacre, following the overturning of the amnesty law by the Salvadoran Supreme Court. However, the inquiry faced obstruction from the Bukele administration. President Bukele ordered the army to block Guzmán from executing a search warrant at the military archives and barracks and further accused Guzmán and the families of the victims of being part of a plot against his government.

In April 2021, Stanford professor Terry Karl testified before the inquiry that United States military advisor Allen Bruce Hazelwood was likely present during the massacre, based on documents and interviews. According to Karl, Hazelwood was with Colonel Monterrosa at the Atlácatl barracks at the start of the massacre, and accompanied Monterrosa by helicopter to the ongoing massacre. Karl alleged that the United States government engaged in a "sophisticated cover-up operation" to conceal the massacre and American presence. Karl also revealed that in 1982, Assistant Secretary of State for Human Rights Elliott Abrams told the director of Human Rights Watch about the presence of an American advisor at El Mozote in private conversation. Hazelwood denied the allegations of being present during the massacre, stating that he was actually 100 miles away training soldiers of the Atlácatl Battalion at the time.

In September 2021, the inquiry was effectively ended as Guzmán was removed as judge and forced to retire by Bukele following judicial reforms many saw as being targeted against the inquiry. Guzmán and other judges who opposed his firing have since faced harassment and retaliation by unknown perpetrators, the police, and government officials.

=== In popular culture ===
A 2026 movie titled Fireflies at El Mozote is based on the events in the massacre. It talks about a boy seeking revenge, after having survived and witnessed government forces brutality killing his family and destroying his village. It premiered in the United States on April 17.

== See also ==
- Anti-communist mass killings
- Central American crisis
- El Calabozo massacre
- Human rights in El Salvador
- La Matanza
- List of massacres in El Salvador
- 1985 Zona Rosa attacks
- Latin America–United States relations
- List of conflicts in South America
- Right-wing terrorism

== Bibliography ==
- Danner, Mark (1994). The Massacre at El Mozote. New York: Vintage Books. ISBN 978-0679755258.
