= José María Tojeira =

Spanish-born Salvadoran Jesuit priest (1947–2025)

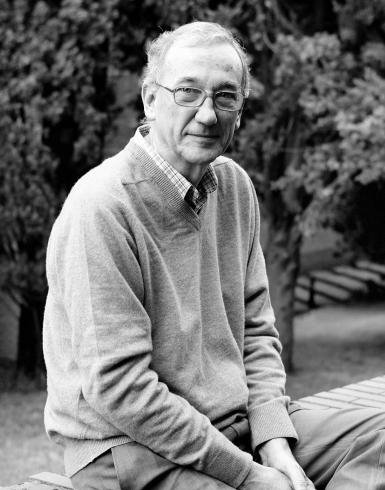
José María Tojeira

José María Tojeira Pelayo (2 August 1947 – 5 September 2025) was a Spanish-born Salvadoran Jesuit priest. He died on 5 September 2025, at the age of 78.
