= Ignacio Ellacuría =

Spanish-Salvadoran Jesuit, philosopher and theologian (1930-1989)

The Reverend Ignacio Ellacuría SJ
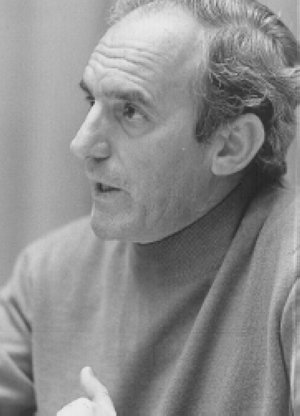
- Born: November 9, 1930; Portugalete, Spain
- Died: November 16, 1989 (aged 59); San Salvador, El Salvador

Philosophical work
- Era: 20th-century philosophy
- Notable ideas: "proseguir"

Ignacio Ellacuría SJ (November 9, 1930 – November 16, 1989) was a Spanish-Salvadoran Jesuit, philosopher, and theologian who worked as a professor and rector at the Universidad Centroamericana "José Simeón Cañas" (UCA), a Jesuit university in El Salvador founded in 1965. He and five other Jesuits and two women were assassinated by Salvadoran soldiers in the closing years of the Salvadoran Civil War.

His work was defining for the shape UCA took in its first years of existence and the years to come. Ellacuría was also responsible for the development of formation programs for priests in the Jesuit Central American province.

== Biography ==
Ellacuría joined the Jesuits in 1947 and was commissioned to the Central American republic of El Salvador in 1948. He lived and worked there for much of his life until his assassination in 1989. In 1958, Ellacuría studied theology with Vatican II theologian Karl Rahner in Innsbruck, Austria. He also lived in Ecuador and Spain.

Ellacuría's academic work was an important contribution to "Liberation Philosophy". This school of philosophy stems from the work of Augusto Salazar Bondy and Leopoldo Zea. It focuses on liberating the oppressed in order "to reach the fullness of humanity". Ellacuría was also a strong supporter and contributor to Liberation Theology. There are different types of Latin American liberation philosophy. Ellacuría's thought represents one of the currents within this philosophical tradition.

The political implications of Ellacuría's commitment to his ideas met strong opposition from the conservative religious and political forces in El Salvador. This opposition led to Ellacuría's murder by the Salvadoran army in 1989 at his residence in UCA along with five other fellow Jesuit priests and two employees.

Their murder marked a turning point in the Salvadoran Civil War. On the one hand, it increased international pressures on the Salvadoran government to sign peace agreements with the guerrilla organisation FMLN. On the other, it helped make Ellacuría's ideas (until then known only in Latin America and Spain) known worldwide.

== Philosophy ==
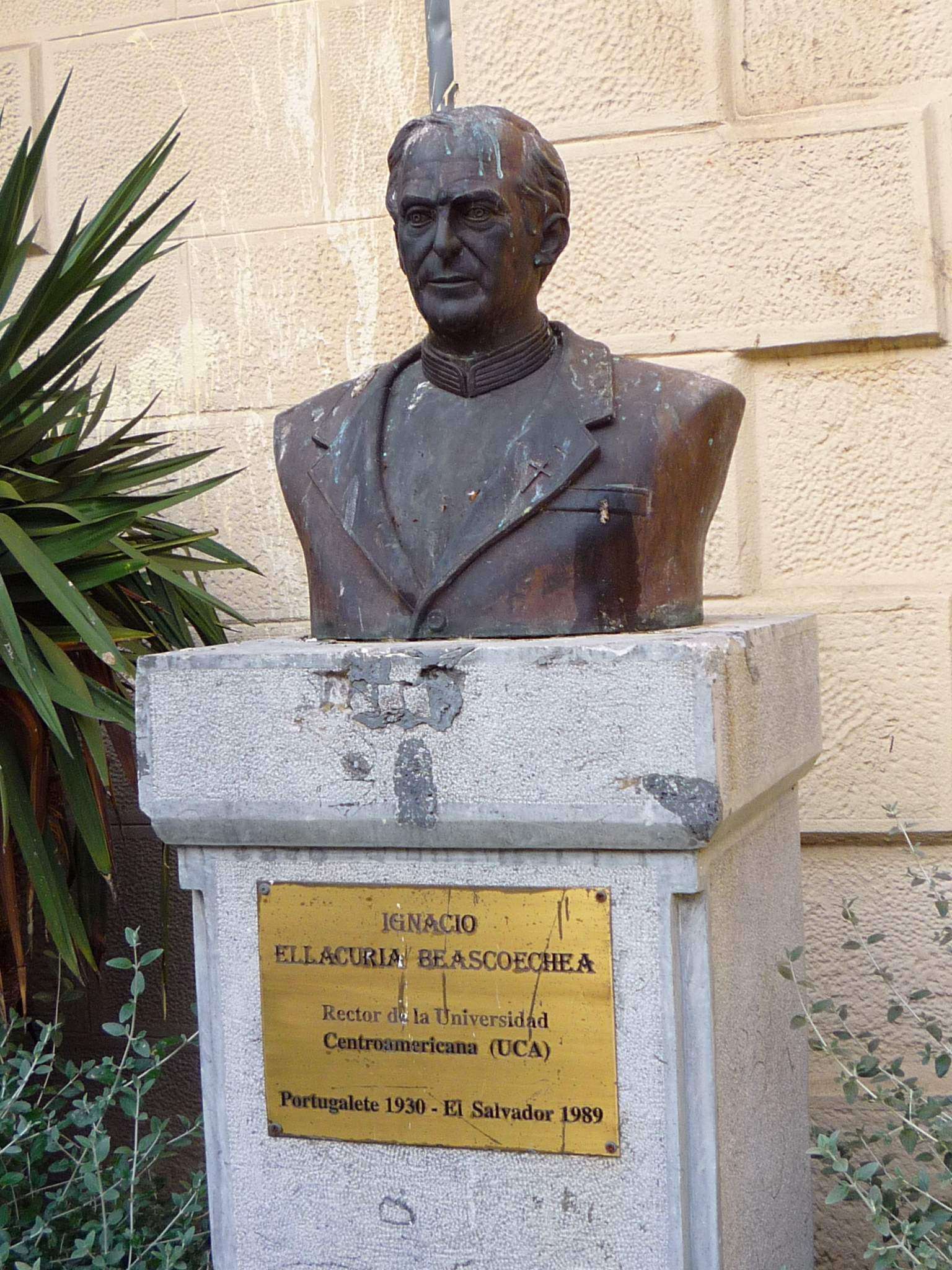
Monument of Ignacio Ellacuría.

Ellacuría's philosophy takes as a starting point Xavier Zubiri's (1898–1983) critique of Western philosophy. For Zubiri, ever since Parmenides, Western thought separated sensing from intelligence. This error led to two results. The first one was what Zubiri called "the logification of intelligence" and the second one was what he called "the entification of reality".

The "logification of intelligence" implied that intellect was reduced to logos. This view led philosophers to believe that what they called "Being" was the cause of reality, and this in turn, explained the confusion of metaphysics with ontology. The logification of intelligence led to the perception of reality as "Being" in a zone in space and time (as in Heidegger's Dasein) of identifiable entities with an essence, outside the human brain. This is what Zubiri called the "entification of reality". This perception sees reality as a particular form of "Being". Thereby, for Zubiri, "Being" had been "substantivised" by Western philosophy.

Against this line of thinking, Ellacuría said human reality is unavoidably personal, social and historical. Biology and society are elements of history, which means that they are always in movement. But this should not be confused with historical materialism that says human beings are passive instruments of the forces of history. Human beings certainly inherit constraints constructed in the past but they always have the possibility to transcend them because of their sentient intelligence. Praxis is the name Ellacuría gives to reflected human action aimed at changing reality. Unlike other animals that can only respond mechanically to stimuli from outside, through sentient intelligence and praxis, human beings have to "realise" their existence. Individuals in dialectic interaction with society, have to make out what sort of Ego to have, by using their sentient intelligence, and this implies transcending inherited constraints.

This means that progress in reality happens through a combination of physical, biological and "praxical" factors. Through praxis, human beings are able to realise a wider range of possibilities for action. In other words, one praxis can lead to a wider and more complete form of praxis. When this is so, praxis can be said to contribute to increased liberty, if liberty is defined as greater possibilities for action. According to Ellacuría, the existence of people that are marginalized from society implies that history and practice have not delivered a wider range of possibilities for realisation for every human being in the world. This situation has prevented these excluded people to realise their existence as human beings. Therefore, it is a situation that stands away from the fullness of humanity and the fullness of reality. But this situation can be changed.

Ellacuría thought that before the evolution of humanity, the further development of historical reality took place only by physical and biological forces. But since the development of human beings, praxis can also contribute to realise historical reality. Since human beings have the possibility to reflect, it is philosophy's duty to exercise this ability to reflect, in order to change reality, and allow greater possibilities for individual realisation. This way of thinking finds its parallels in the 1990s in Martha Nussbaum's definition of human development as the increase in human capabilities for action and Amartya Sen's notion of development as freedom.

== Theology ==
As many other theologians of his generation, Ellacuría intended to construct a new theology, which he called a historical theology. Methodologically, his view of history followed the Hegelian dialectic tradition, that culminated in Marx's historical materialism. However, in terms of content, he was also critical of Hegel's eurocentric view of history. Ellacuría rejected as well Marx's view of human beings as objects of their material conditions. He stressed the importance of conscience, human praxis and its possibilities for influencing the course of history, and thereby material conditions themselves. Critics have accused him of contaminating theology with Marxism. His thought shares with Marxism a common Hegelian view of history as progress brought about by overcoming contradictions. Some, as Enrique Dussel, would claim that the similarities between liberation theology and Marx's thought are to be found in common origins of the narrative of liberation in the Judeo-Christian tradition of thought.

By "historical theology", Ellacuría meant a way of making theology: to reflect about faith from the historical present and to reflect about the historical present from faith. According to him, all theology is conditioned by its historical present. Historical theology intends to acquire conscience about its historical context and to incorporate it fully. The concept of locus theologicus (theological place) is very important in this theology.

Rudolf Bultmann developed existential biblical hermeneutics, or the idea that each individual can only read and understand the bible from their personal existential condition, and the biblical text acquires life only if it can awaken an experience of faith in the reader. This generates a hermeneutical circle, since the reader understands the Bible from his historical present and the historical present from the Bible. Ellacuría placed himself in this hermeneutic tradition, and he gave a step further. For Ellacuría, the reader is not just an individual but a community, just like the people of Israel in the Old Testament. This means that community faith comes first, and then individual faith.

According to Ellacuría, the value of the Old Testament is not reduced with the New Testament. The New Testament makes the community character of faith from the Old Testament something radical and universal. It makes it radical, because it establishes that the alliance of God with people is much more than a simple code of laws and liturgical rituals; it is an invitation to justice and charity, not as exceptional practices, but as a stable structure. That is why this alliance is established in a law. It makes the faith universal, because the New Testament is communicated to every human being, independently of race, culture, sex, religion or social condition.

Liberation theology is then, according to Ellacuría, a new way of doing historical theology in a particular locus theologicus: the historical present of Latin America, where a large portion of the population is oppressed by structures that deny them the possibilities to satisfy their needs and to develop. It arises from the spirit of Gaudium et spes of the Second Vatican Council and the social encyclicals of Pope John XXIII, and more specifically, the Episcopal Conferences of Medellín in 1968 and Puebla in 1978. Such a reflection on the Bible is supported on the historical present of a collectivity that desires liberation from oppression. There is a long biblical tradition about liberation that starts with the Book of Exodus.

According to Ellacuría, salvation is accomplished historically, not just individually, but collectively. It is not just about liberation from evil, guilt, personal or social offenses, pain, disease and fetichism. Those forms of liberation only start by liberation from unjust structures like slavery, political domination, psychological and social oppression. Besides the book of Exodus, the Bible also presents other such cases of liberation from oppression as the return from exile in Babylon in the books of Esdras and Nehemiah; the fight against Macedonian occupation in the book of Maccabees; the Beatitudes of Jesus; and the book of Apocalypse in the face of the persecution of Christians in Rome.

Other forms of doing historical theology would be for example Feminist Theology; Black liberation theology as developed by James Cone in the fight for civil rights in the United States; African Liberation Theology, that has mostly been applied to South Africa in the fight against apartheid; and Indigenous Theology that stems from Bartolomé de las Casas and other missionaries in the first Spanish colonies in the Americas in the 16th century.

=== Union of science and theology ===
In his commencement address to Santa Clara University in 1982, Ellacuría addressed the challenges implied in relating theology with science. He articulated a relationship between the two in his vision of a university that served the purpose of liberating the oppressed. According to Ellacuría, there are two aspects to every university. The most evident one is that it deals with culture, or, in other words, knowledge and the use of sentient intellect. The second, and not so evident, is that it must be concerned with the social reality, precisely because a university is inescapably a social force; it must transform and enlighten the society in which it lives.

Ellacuría believed that a university cannot always and in every place be the same. It must constantly look at its own peculiar historical reality. The Third World is characterized more by oppression than by liberty, more by poverty than by abundance. According to Ellacuría, in such a context a university must do everything possible so that liberty overcomes oppression. He added that the university must carry out this general commitment with the means uniquely at its disposal. As an intellectual community, the university must analyse causes; use imagination and creativity together to discover remedies to problems; communicate a consciousness that inspires the freedom of self-determination; educate professionals with a conscience, who will be the immediate instruments of such a transformation; and constantly hone an educational institution that is both academically excellent and ethically oriented.

Ellacuría thought that it is possible for reason and faith to merge in confronting the reality of the poor. Reason must open its eyes to their suffering, while faith sees in the weak of this world what salvation must mean and the conversion to which we are called.

Such a university must take into account the preferential option for the poor. This does not mean that only the poor will study at the university; it does not mean that the university should abdicate its mission of academic excellence, an excellence which is needed in order to solve complex social issues of our time. What it does mean, he argued, is that the university should be present intellectually where it is needed; to provide science for those without science; to provide skills for those without skills; to be a voice for those without voices; to give intellectual support, for those who do not possess the academic qualifications to make their rights legitimate.

== Sainthood ==
In August 2023, the Archbishop of San Salvador announced the opening of Ellacuría's cause for canonization.

== Selection of Ellacuría's publications ==
- Ellacuría, Ignacio, Veinte Años de Historia en El Salvador: Escritos Políticos [VA], three volumes, second edition, San Salvador: UCA Editores, 1993
- Ellacuría, Ignacio, Escritos Universitarios [EU], San Salvador: UCA Editores, 1999.
- Ellacuría, Ignacio, Filosofía de la Realidad Histórica, San Salvador: UCA Editores, 1990.
- Ellacuría, Ignacio, Escritos Filosóficos [EF], three volumes San Salvador: UCA Editores, 1996–2001.
- Ellacuría, Ignacio, Escritos Teológicos [ET], four volumes, San Salvador: UCA Editores, 2000–2002
- Ellacuría, Ignacio, "Filosofía y Política" [1972], VA-1, pp. 47–62
- Ellacuría, Ignacio, "Liberación: Misión y Carisma de la Iglesia" [1973], ET-2, pp. 553–584
- Ellacuría, Ignacio, "Diez Años Después: ¿Es Posible una Universidad Distinta?" [1975], EU, pp. 49–92
- Ellacuría, Ignacio, "Hacia una Fundamentación del Método Teológico Latinoamericana" [1975], ET-1, pp. 187–218
- Ellacuría, Ignacio, "Filosofía, ¿Para Qué?" [1976], EF-3, pp. 115–132
- Ellacuría, Ignacio, "Fundamentación Biológica de la Ética" [1979], EF-3, pp. 251–269
- Ellacuría, Ignacio, "Universidad y Política" [1980], VA-1, pp. 17–46
- Ellacuría, Ignacio, "El Objeto de la Filosofía" [1981], VA-1, pp. 63–92
- Ellacuría, Ignacio, "Función Liberadora de la Filosofía" [1985], VA-1, pp. 93–122
- Ellacuría, Ignacio, "La Superación del Reduccionismo Idealista en Zubiri" [1988], EF-3, pp. 403–430
- Ellacuría, Ignacio, "El Desafío de las Mayorías Populares" (1989), EU, pp. 297–306 (an English translation is available in TSSP, pp. 171–176)
- Ellacuría, Ignacio, "En Torno al Concepto y a la Idea de Liberación" [1989], ET-1, pp. 629–657
- Ellacuría, Ignacio, "Utopía y Profetismo en América Latina" [1989], ET-2, pp. 233–294 (an English translation is available in TSSP, pp. 44–88).

About Ellacuría

- Burke, Kevin, The Ground Beneath the Cross: The Theology of Ignacio Ellacuría, Washington, DC: Georgetown University Press, 2000.
- Burke, Kevin; Lassalle-Klein, Robert, Love that Produces Hope. The Thought of Ignacio Ellacuría, Colleville, Minnesota: Liturgical Press, 2005.
- Cerutti, Horacio, Filosofia de la Liberación Latinoamericana, Mexico City: FCE, 1992.
- Hassett, John; Lacey, Hugh (eds.), Towards a Society that Serves its People: The Intellectual Contribution of El Salvador’s Murdered Jesuits [TSSP], Washington, DC: Georgetown University Press, 1991.
- Lee, Michael, Bearing the Weight of Salvation. The Soteriology of Ignacio Ellacuría, New York: Herder Book, The Crossroad Publishing Company, 2008.
- Samour, Héctor, Voluntad de Liberación: El Pensamiento Filosófico de Ignacio Ellacuría, San Salvador: UCA Editores, 2002
- Sols Lucia, José: The Legacy of Ignacio Ellacuría, Barcelona: Cristianisme i Justícia, 1998.
- Sols Lucia, José: La teología histórica de Ignacio Ellacuría, Madrid: Trotta, 1999.
- Sols Lucia, José: Las razones de Ellacuría, Barcelona: Cristianisme i Justícia, 2014.
- Whitfield, Teresa, Paying the Price: Ignacio Ellacuría and the Murdered Jesuits of El Salvador, Philadelphia: Temple University Press, 1995.
