= Ignacio Martín-Baró =

Spanish scholar, Jesuit priest, assassinated martyr in El Salvador

Ignacio Martín-Baró SJ (November 7, 1942 – November 16, 1989) was a scholar, social psychologist, philosopher and Jesuit priest who was born in Valladolid, Spain, and died in San Salvador, El Salvador. He was one of the victims of the 1989 murders of Jesuits in El Salvador.

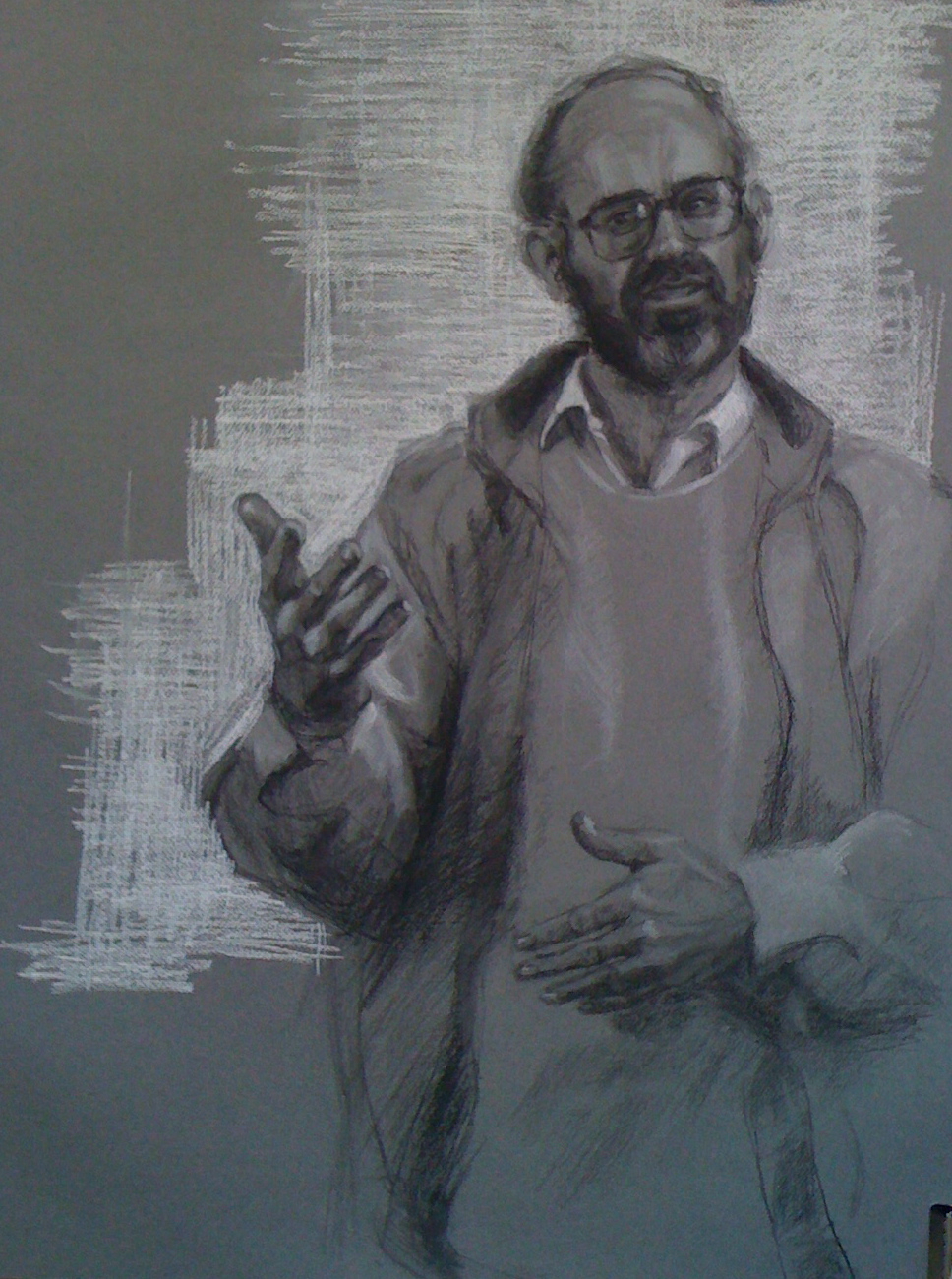
Ignacio Martín-Baró.

== Academic career ==
Martín-Baró entered the novitiate of the Society of Jesus in Orduña, Spain, on September 28, 1959. Shortly after, he was transferred to the novitiate of Villagarcía and then sent to Central America, where he completed his second year in the novitiate of the Society of Jesus.

At the end of September 1961, he began his studies in classical humanities at the Pontificia Universidad Católica del Ecuador in Quito. On graduating, he travelled to Bogotá, where he studied philosophy at the Pontificia Universidad Javeriana, run by the Jesuits. In 1964 he received his bachelor's degree in philosophy and in 1965 his licentiate (licenciatura) in philosophy and literature. In 1966 he returned to El Salvador, where he got a job as a teacher and academic coordinator at the Externado San José. In 1967, he started teaching at the Universidad Centroamericana "José Simeón Cañas" (UCA).

He travelled to Frankfurt in 1967 to study theology. Returning to San Salvador to continue his studies, he obtained his bachelor's degree from St John Berchmans University College, Heverlee, Belgium, in 1970. He then began studying psychology at UCA, where he was also lecturer. In 1975 he completed his licentiate in psychology.

In 1971 and 1972 he taught psychology in the National Nursing Academy in Santa Ana. Later he was dean of Students between 1972 and 1975, and a member of the University Board, at UCA. From 1971 until 1974 he was head of the editorial board of the academic journal Estudios Centroamericanos (ECA).

In 1977 he earned a master's degree in social sciences from the University of Chicago and two years later, in 1979, a Ph.D. in social and organisational psychology from the same institution. In his master's thesis, he discussed social attitudes and group conflict in El Salvador, a theme which he continued in his doctoral dissertation which focused on population density of the lowest social classes in El Salvador.

On completing his studies he returned to San Salvador, where he lectured in psychology at UCA. By 1981 he was Academic Vice-Rector and member of the board of directors. In 1982 he became head of the psychology department. In 1986 he founded and directed the University Institute of Public Opinion, IUDOP. In 1989, the academic vice-rector's office was split in two and Martín-Baró became director of post-graduate studies and research.

He was a member of the editorial board of UCA Editores and Estudios Centroamericanos (ECA), the Salvadoran Journal of Psychology and the Costa Rican magazine Polémica. He was a visiting professor at the Central University of Venezuela, the Universidad del Zulia in Maracaibo, the University of Puerto Rico, Pontificia Universidad Javeriana in Bogotá, Universidad Complutense in Madrid and Universidad de Costa Rica in San José. He was a member of the American Psychological Association as well as the Salvadoran Psychological Association. He was the vice-president of the Mesoamerican division of the Interamerican Psychological Society.

Martín-Baró published eleven books and a long list of cultural and scientific articles, in various Latin American and North American academic journals and magazines.

== Social psychology ==
Martín Baró argued that psychology should be developed to address the historical context, the social conditions and aspirations of the people. He believed that students of psychology should learn to analyse human behaviour in the location of their practice, bearing in mind the criteria outlined for that location.

In his writings and lectures he rejected the idea of universal, impartial psychology, and developed a psychology that was critically committed with the projects for alternative societies that existed in Latin America. For him, the psychological situation of individuals could either be an abnormal reaction to normal circumstances, or a normal reaction to abnormal conditions.

For Martín-Baró, the solution to mental health problems in societies characterised by oppression, where "normal abnormality" prevails, is the transformation of society to transcend the historical reality of oppression. Psychologists cannot ignore the influence that difficult contexts have on mental health. Furthermore, if they do, then they become accomplices to the social injustices (or abnormalities) that may have caused these mental health problems.

He integrated diverse theories, and was so convinced of the benefits to be gained by the "de-ideologising" potential of social psychology that he openly questioned the theoretical models of mainstream psychology. He considered the latter inadequate to address the effects of the structural violence that prevailed in El Salvador.

== Continuing impact ==
His work inspired the development of liberation psychology in Latin America and influenced community psychology and some strands of social psychology. His work has also had an influence on some feminist psychology and critical health psychology

Through grant-making and education, the Martín-Baró Fund for Mental Health and Human Rights fosters psychological well-being, social consciousness, active resistance, and progressive social change in communities affected by institutional violence, repression and social injustice.
