= Truth Commission for El Salvador =

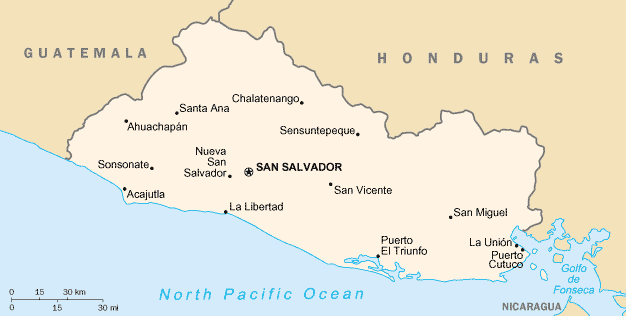
- Active: 1992–1993
- Established: 1 July 1992
- Report Released: March 1993
- Scope of Commission: 1980–1992
- Sanctioned by: UN Secretary General
- Country: El Salvador
- Chairman: Belisario Betancur
- Purpose: Investigate the extent of human rights violations throughout the 12 year civil war.

The Truth Commission for El Salvador (Spanish: Comisión de la Verdad para El Salvador) was a restorative justice truth commission approved by the United Nations to investigate the grave wrongdoings that occurred throughout the country's twelve year civil war. It is estimated that 1.4 percent of the Salvadoran population was killed during the war. The commission operated from July 1992 until March 1993, when its findings were published in the final report, From Madness to Hope. The eight-month period heard from over 2,000 witness testimonies and compiled information from an additional 20,000 witness statements.

In December 1991, preliminary talks began between the Salvadoran government and the leftist guerrilla militia, the Farabundo Martí National Liberation Front (FMLN), with UN secretary-general Javier Pérez de Cuéllar overseeing the negotiations. The agreement was finalized and signed by both parties on 16 January 1992, at what is known as the Chapultepec Peace Accords.

Pérez de Cuéllar appointed three lead commissioners, with the agreement of both the Salvadoran government and the FMLN, to head the investigation. Unlike preceding restorative justice initiatives, the Salvadoran commission was composed entirely of international commissioners.

== Historical background ==
=== Military regime ===
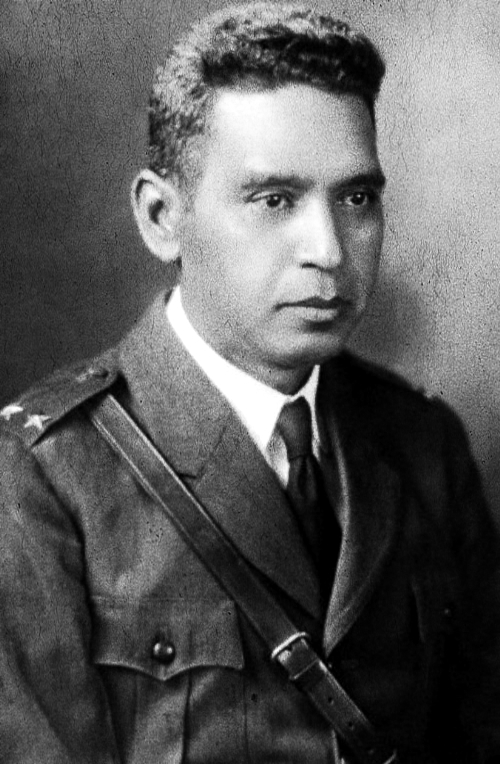
General Maximiliano Hernández Martínez served as President from 1935–1944.

Since its independence in 1838, El Salvador experienced years of political strife mostly due to the unequal spread of wealth throughout the country, a long-term effect of Spanish colonization. Despite this unrest however, political violence was relatively low until 1931 with the emergence of military dictatorship. In 1931, President Pío Romero Bosque permitted the country's first free elections. This however resulted in a military coup led by General Maximiliano Hernández Martínez later that year.

Hernández Martínez was elected to a four-year term as president in 1935 and re-elected in 1939 to a six-year term. In 1944 legislation was passed to allow Hernández Martínez to serve another five years yet this proved too much for the Salvadoran people. In May 1944 revolution broke out forcing him to resign from office and allowing the military to seize control of the government. General Andrés Menéndez assumed the presidency, however after only five months another revolt took place leaving Colonel Osmín Aguirre y Salinas in control, marking another period of unrest in the country.

This cycle of instability and military intervention plagued the country until 1961 when a junta of conservative military officers, led by Lieutenant Colonel Julio Adalberto Rivera, executed a countercoup. The new administration demonstrated their progressive ideologies, introducing over 300 new laws within nine months. In 1962, Rivera resigned from the junta in order to seek the presidency. He was elected and served a full term which concluded in 1967. His successor General Fidel Sánchez Hernández was elected in March 1967, what was considered the most honest presidential election up to that point.

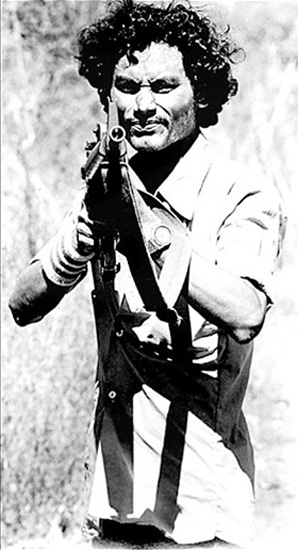
A Farabundo Martí National Liberation Front (FMLN) soldier takes aim during a wartime "road advisory" near Suchitoto, El Salvador (1984).

=== Formation of the FMLN ===
In January 1932, labour leader Farabundo Martí led a peasant revolt in the western countryside of El Salvador. The revolt was in opposition to the military dictatorship and what is known as the Fourteen Families, the oligarchy which controls a disproportionate share of wealth. The two-day revolt was opposed and suppressed by Hernández Martínez, who authorized the execution of thousands of Salvadorans, in what is commonly referred to as la matanza. It is estimated that between 10,000 and 30,000 civilians were killed as a result of the peasant revolt, with a majority of the casualties being indigenous people.

Clashes between the right-wing military government and left-wing guerrillas continued virtually incessantly until the 1970s. Throughout the 1970s guerrillas faced constant antagonization from paramilitary death squads, leading to increasing violence. In October 1979 the government was ousted by the Revolutionary Government Junta (JRG) promising reform. By January 1980 right-wing extremists were threatening violence against the JRG, forcing all of its civilian members to resign.

On 24 March 1980, Salvadoran archbishop Óscar Romero, an outspoken human rights advocate was assassinated during a Mass ceremony in San Salvador. It is alleged that death squad commander Major Roberto D'Aubuisson was responsible for ordering Romero's assassination. In October 1980 the FMLN was officially created as an amalgamation of five leftist guerrilla groups. Their main opposition was D'Aubuisson, and he is assumed to have been the main organizer behind an attempted coup against the JRG.

=== Civil war ===
By late 1979, tensions once again rose in El Salvador, with the government of General Carlos Humberto Romero committing various human rights abuses, leading Catholic clergymen to speak out against the injustices. In October 1979, Carlos Humberto Romero was ousted in a military coup. The coup compounded with the assassination of Óscar Romero was ultimately the tipping point, marking the beginning of civil war.

In late 1980 the United States began to show an increasing interest in Salvadoran affairs, fearing the country was susceptible to Communist control leading to "another Nicaragua" situation. The United States government continued to finance the war in El Salvador throughout the 1980s, providing approximately $4.5 billion in military and other aid. The United States provided elite training and organization, sophisticated weaponry, and helicopters to the Salvadoran military. According to Benjamin Schwarz, America's involvement in El Salvador was the most "prolonged and expensive military endeavour in the period between the Vietnam War and the Persian Gulf conflict".

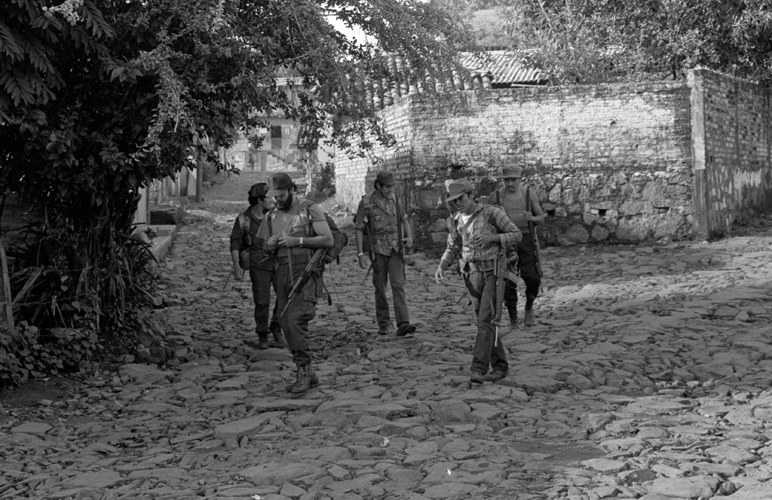
Guerrilla combatants in Perquín, El Salvador in 1990.

In September 1981, Roberto D'Aubuisson formed a new right-wing political party, known as the Nationalist Republican Alliance (ARENA), to combat the FMLN. One of the most violent markers of the civil war was the El Mozote massacre, in which nearly 1,000 civilians were killed during a military counterinsurgency operation. The decade would continue to see violent clashes between the opposing parties.

The presidential election of 1989 saw the victory of ARENA candidate Alfredo Cristiani, who continued to enforce severe offences against the FMLN. In November 1989 the FMLN organized a major offensive against multiple urban cities, including the capital city. The military was taken by surprise and had to fight vehemently for weeks before the guerrillas were forced to retreat. The battle employed egregious indiscriminate violence throughout San Salvador, leading to one of 16 November 1989 murder of six Jesuit priests and two women were executed by soldiers who entered their residence under the pretense that they were aiding leftist fighters. The massacre garnered widespread international coverage of the atrocities in El Salvador, urging pressure for negotiations between the conflicting sides. By the conclusion of the war in 1992, an estimated 75,000 Salvadorans had been killed.

== End of the Civil War ==
UN intervention led to the signing of the Chapultepec Peace Agreements ending the twelve year civil war.

=== United Nations Intervention ===
With increasing international pressure and Cristiani's doubt over the military's abilities to stifle the FMLN, UN-mediated peace talks began in July 1990 when both signed the Agreement on Human Rights. This accord was tasked with establishing a United Nations mission that would monitor human rights issues in the country, thus ONUSAL was founded.

In December 1991 the Salvadoran government and FMLN representatives met at the United Nations headquarters in New York City to sign the Act of New York, which effectively combined several agreements signed up until that date, including the Mexico Agreement of 1991 that called for the establishment of a truth commission. Both parties also agreed to sign a final Peace Agreement on 16 January 1992 in Mexico City, what is known as the Chapultepec Peace Accords.

== The Commission on the Truth for El Salvador ==
=== Formation and Structure ===
The commission was established in accordance with the Mexico Agreement of 1991, assigned to investigate "serious acts of violence that had occurred between January 1980 and July 1991" that required "public knowledge of the truth". Three international public figures were appointed as commissioners by the Secretary-General:

- Belisario Betancur, former president of Colombia;
- Thomas Buergenthal, former president of the Inter-American Court of Human Rights; and
- Reinaldo Figueredo Planchart, former foreign minister of Venezuela.

The commission opened offices throughout the country in Chalatenango, Santa Ana and San Miguel.

The commission's final report with conclusions and recommendations was to be transmitted to the Secretary-General who would make the report public. In the commission's mandate, both parties agreed to comply with its final recommendations. Lastly, the commission was granted for a period of only six months to perform its investigation, although this was later extended by two months.

=== Objectives ===
The commission's official mandate stated:

The commission shall have the task of investigating serious acts of violence that have occurred since 1980 and whose impact on society urgently demands that the public should know the truth.

The ambiguity of the wording gave the commission the authority to decide which incidents they would investigate, as not every account could be heard. The commission had to take the importance and social impact affiliated with each event into consideration in order to pursue further investigation. The mandate however did not distinguish large-scale acts of violence from smaller ones, it simply emphasized "serious acts of violence" which often outraged the Salvadoran public or potentially garnered international attention.

The commission understood that the purpose of its formation was to "find and publicize the truth about the acts of violence committed by both sides during the war". Furthermore, they agreed that the necessity of a public report on their findings was an urgent matter.

The mandate also entrusted the commission with producing "legal, political or administrative" recommendations, however it failed to specify the principles of law applicable to it. Moreover, during the time the commission took place, El Salvador was obligated by international law to adjust its domestic judicial system, and constrained to observe international human rights laws as the ONUSAL mission was underway.

=== Activities ===
==== Collection of Data ====
The commission heard approximately 2,000 witness testimonies on the scope of atrocities committed. Additionally it collected data from national and international human rights groups, detailing the accounts of over 20,000 additional witnesses. All of this painstaking research was conducted by the three lead commissioners and a support staff of twenty members, as well as an additional twenty five short-term staff in the concluding months of the commission. The commission staff did not include any Salvadorans.

They realized that the Secretary-General... had not been wrong in seeking to preserve the Commission's credibility by looking beyond considerations of sovereignty and entrusting this task to three scholars from other countries, in contrast to what had been done in Argentina and Chile after the military dictatorships there had ended.

==== External Assistance ====
The commission contracted the assistance of the Argentine Forensic Anthropology Team to investigate the controversial massacre in the town of El Mozote, and exhume the remains of victims from this particular massacre in an attempt to figure out how many casualties were recorded. Exhumation took place from 13 to 17 November 1992 under the supervision of Dr. Clyde Snow, Dr. Robert H. Kirschner, Dr. Douglass Scott, and Dr. John Fitzpatrick of the Santa Tecla Institute of Forensic Medicine and of the Commission for the Investigation of Criminal Acts. In the exhumation the doctors worked alongside Patricia Bernardi, Mercedes Doretti and Luis Fondebrider of the Argentine Forensic Anthropology Team. The process discovered skeletal remains of at least 143, however they noted that there may have been a greater number of casualties. The forensic report supported victim testimonies that "victims were summarily executed," and that at least 24 people participated in the shootings.

== The Final Report ==
=== Conclusions and Recommendations ===
The commission concluded that approximately 85% of the abuses committed between 1980 and 1991 were committed by government forces. Controversially, the commission named over 40 senior members of the military, judicial system, and armed opposition in the report for their involvement in the conduction of the mass atrocities. Furthermore, from the 22,000 testimonies documented, at least 60% involved murders, 25% involved disappearances, and 20% involved torture.

According to the commission's mandate, its recommendations were legally binding. These recommendations urged the dismissal of any military officers or civil servants that were involved in the atrocities from government employment, as well as disqualifying them from holding positions in public office. The commission also proposed an overhaul of El Salvador's judicial and legal system. Furthermore, it called for reparations and monetary compensation to victims and survivors. Lastly, the commission recommended the creation of a forum to oversee the implementation of its recommendations.

=== Impact and Criticisms ===
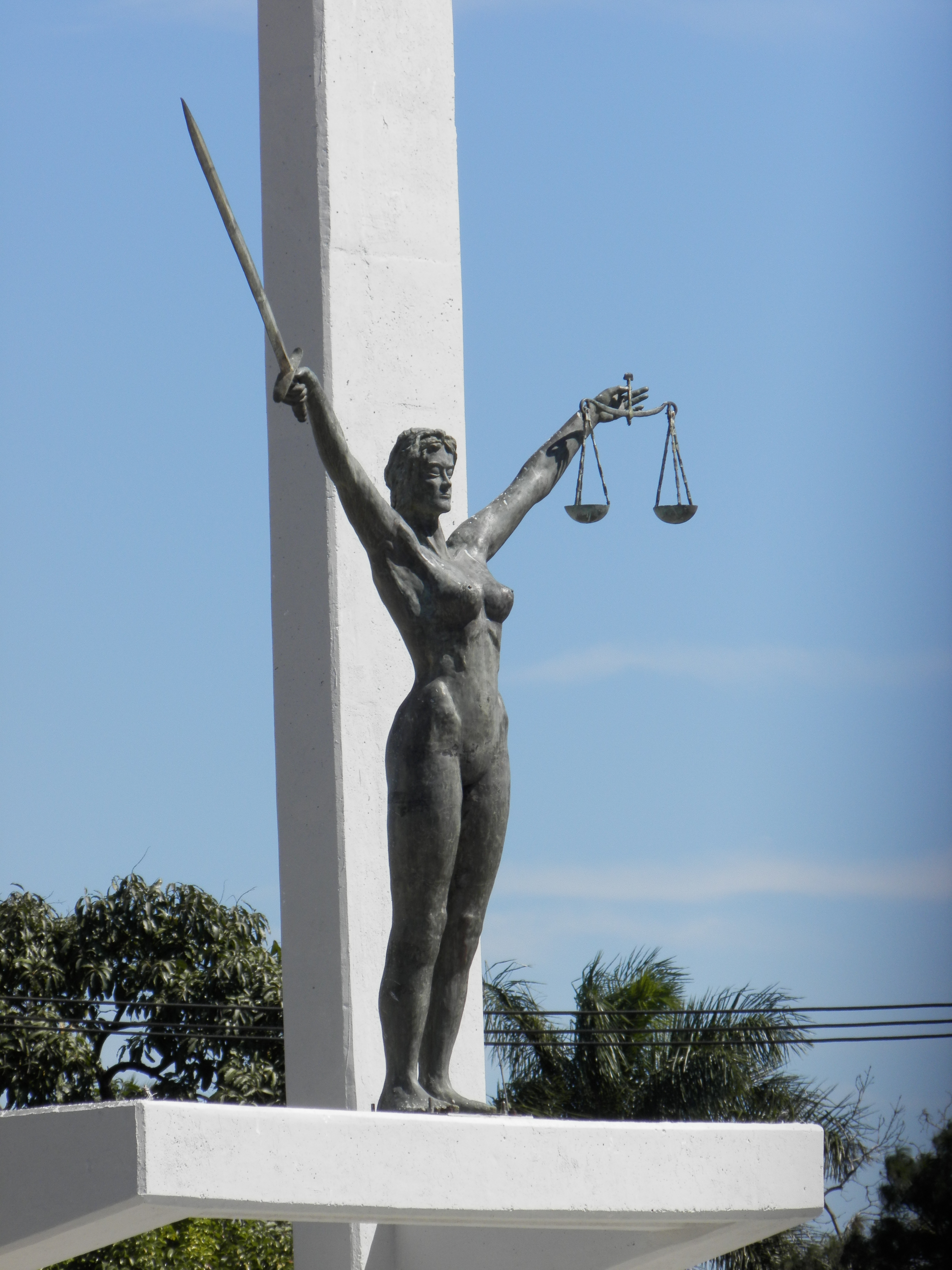
Monumento a la Constitución located in San Salvador, erected in 1992 to symbolize peace.

With the release of From Madness to Hope in March 1993, human rights advocates in El Salvador and the United States accepted and applauded the commission for its analysis of the atrocities, and for its recommendations. However it was criticized for failing to scrutinize the involvement of the United States, as well as the activity of Salvadoran death squads. The high commander of the Salvadoran military publicly responded to the report on national television, through a statement read by the defense minister. The statement claimed that the report was "unfair, incomplete, illegal, unethical, biased, and insolent." Furthermore, the Salvadoran president, Alfredo Cristiani, claimed that the report did not fulfill the desires of the Salvadoran people who wanted to "forget this painful past."

Many of the commission's recommendations were not accepted or implemented by the government. Approximately 200 senior members of the military were removed from their positions; they retired with full honours and benefits. In 1996, a new Criminal Procedure Code was introduced into the judicial system in accordance with the commission's recommendation, one of the few recommendations implemented. On 20 March 1993, five days after the release of the UN commission's report, the government passed a blanket amnesty law, modifying an amnesty law passed on 23 January 1992, a week after the signing of the peace agreement ending the civil war. To date, the government has yet to adopt the recommendation to award reparations to victims or survivors.

In 2010, President Mauricio Funes established special commissions to address reparations, which have yet to result in the payment of reparations. Funes is the first president to officially apologize and acknowledge the abuses of the civil war. In 2016, the El Salvador Supreme Court ruled that the amnesty law was unconstitutional and that the El Salvador government could prosecute war criminals.

=== Sites of Memory ===
In recent years there has been a push to create monuments and sites of memory in an attempt to nationally recognize the atrocities of the war. In 1992 Salvadoran sculptor Ruben Martinez was commissioned to create a monument dedicated to "the birth of an era of peace in El Salvador." Following the signing of the Chapultepec Peace Accords, Carlos "Santiago" Henriquez Consalvi, a Venezuelan journalist, proposed an initiative to preserve and commemorate Salvadoran history. The result was the foundation of the Museo de la Palabra y la Imagen in 1996. More recently in 2003, the Monument of Memory and Truth was erected in San Salvador. The tribute is a granite wall engraved with the names of those killed or disappeared during the country's civil war. However at the time the project began, a list of victims' names was incomplete, thus as of 2008 the wall had engraved 30,000 names and was an ongoing project.
