= Central American University, San Salvador =

Salvadoran private university

Coordinates: 13°40′51.18″N 89°14′5.77″W

José Simeón Cañas Central American University
- Universidad Centroamericana José Simeón Cañas
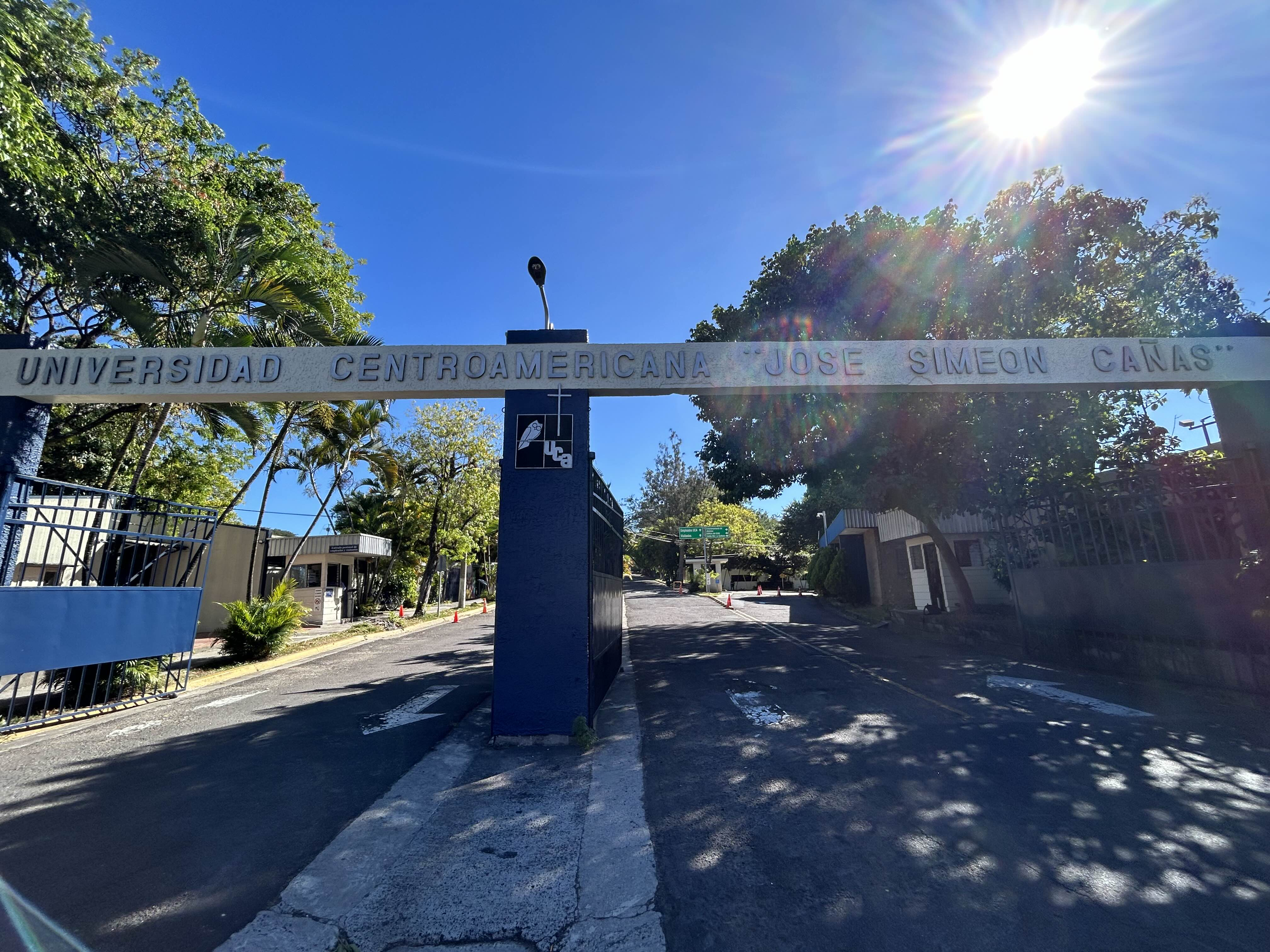
- Other names: La UCA
- Motto: Spanish: Universidad para el Cambio Social
- Motto in English: University for Social Change
- Type: Private Nonprofit
- Established: 15 September 1965; 60 years ago
- Religious affiliation: Catholic Church (Society of Jesus)
- Academic affiliations: AUSJAL
- Rector: Mario Cornejo, S.J.
- Academic staff: 421
- Students: 8,993
- Location: Antiguo Cuscatlán, El Salvador
- Campus: Urban, 38 acres (15 ha)
- Colors: Black, white, blue
- Mascot: Owl
- Website: www.uca.edu.sv

José Simeón Cañas Central American University (Spanish: Universidad Centroamericana "José Simeón Cañas"), also known as UCA El Salvador, is a private Catholic university with nonprofit purposes in Antiguo Cuscatlán, El Salvador. It is operated by the Society of Jesus.

UCA was founded on September 15, 1965, at the request of a group of Catholic families who appealed to the Salvadoran government and the Society of Jesus in order to create a university as an alternative to the University of El Salvador, becoming the first private institution of higher education in the country.

== History ==
the university's focus on playing a decisive role in the transformation of the unjust Salvadoran society. Such a focus within the Salvadoran context has driven the university to give priority to undergraduate degrees, research within the social sciences, and popular presentation of research results ("social projectionl") in local peer-reviewed journals.

In the 1970s and 1980s, during the Civil War in El Salvador, UCA was known as the home of several internationally recognized Jesuit scholars and intellectuals, including Jon Sobrino, Ignacio Ellacuría, Ignacio Martín-Baró, and Segundo Montes. They were outspoken against the abuses of the Salvadoran military and government, and carried out research to demonstrate the effects of the war and poverty in the country. The extreme social conditions in El Salvador provided a very rich empirical basis for innovative research within sociology, social anthropology, philosophy, social psychology, and theology. These scholars made important and lasting contributions within these fields. Ellacuría, Martín-Baró and Segundo Montes, along with three other Jesuit professors, their housekeeper, and her daughter, were murdered by the Salvadoran Armed forces on November 16, 1989, in one of the most notorious episodes from the Civil War (see Murder of UCA scholars).

== Campus ==
The university is located at Antiguo Cuscatlán. The university campus has 38 acres (16 ha) with 33 buildings, a professional soccer field, basketball and volleyball courts, as well as three auditoriums and four cafeterias. The campus also includes a minimarket, a museum, three clinics, a book shop, a main library, several smaller thematic libraries, and a documentation center.

=== Faculties ===
- Faculty of Economics and Business Sciences
- Faculty of Human and Social Sciences
- Faculty of Engineering and Architecture

=== Academic departments ===
- Department of Mathematics
- Department of Business Administration
- Department of Judicial Sciences
- Department of Sociology and Political Science
- Department of Economics
- Department of Accounting and Finance
- Department of Psychology
- Department of Philosophy
- Department of Theology
- Department of Educational Sciences
- Department of Communications and Culture
- Department of Public Health
- Department of Operations and Systems
- Department of Electronics and Informatics
- Department of Energy and Fluid Sciences
- Department of Structural Mechanics
- Department of Spatial Organization
- Department of Engineering Process and Environmental Science

=== Social projection ===
- UCA Audiovisuals
- YSUCA 91.7 FM Radio
- Monseñor Romero Center
- University's Public Opinion Institute - IUDOP
- University's Human Rights Institute - IDHUCA

== Academics ==
=== Undergraduate programs ===
- Architecture
- Civil Engineering
- Electrical Engineering
- Mechanical Engineering
- Industrial Engineering
- Chemical Engineering
- Food Engineering
- Energetic Engineering
- Computing Engineering
- Technician in Marketing
- Technician in Accounting
- Licenciate in Philosophy
- Licenciate in Theology
- Licenciate in Psychology
- Licenciate in Economics
- Licenciate in Marketing
- Licenciate in Public Accounting
- Licenciate in Business Administration
- Licenciate in Agribusiness Administration
- Licenciate in Judicial Sciences
- Licenciate in Social Communications
- Licenciate in Design
- Professorate of Theology
- Professorate of Special Education
- Professorate of Preschool Education
- Professorate of Basic Education (1st & 2nd Cycles)
- Professorate of English Language (3rd Cycle Basic and Middle Education)

=== Postgraduate programs ===
- Master in Iberoamerican Philosophy
- Master in Social Sciences
- Master in Political Sciences
- Master in Latin American Theology
- Master in Local Development
- Master in Criminal Constitutional Law
- Master in Applied Statistics to Investigation
- Master in Environmental Management
- Master in Industrial Maintenance Management
- Master in Public Health
- Master in Communitarian Psychology
- Master in Educational Evaluation and Politics
- Master in Communications
- Master in Finance
- Master in Financial Audit
- Master in Business Law
- Master in Business Administration
- Doctorate in Iberoamerican Philosophy
- Doctorate in Social Sciences

== See also ==
- Education in El Salvador
- List of Jesuit sites
- List of universities in El Salvador
- José Simeón Cañas
