= Koos Koster =

Dutch journalist

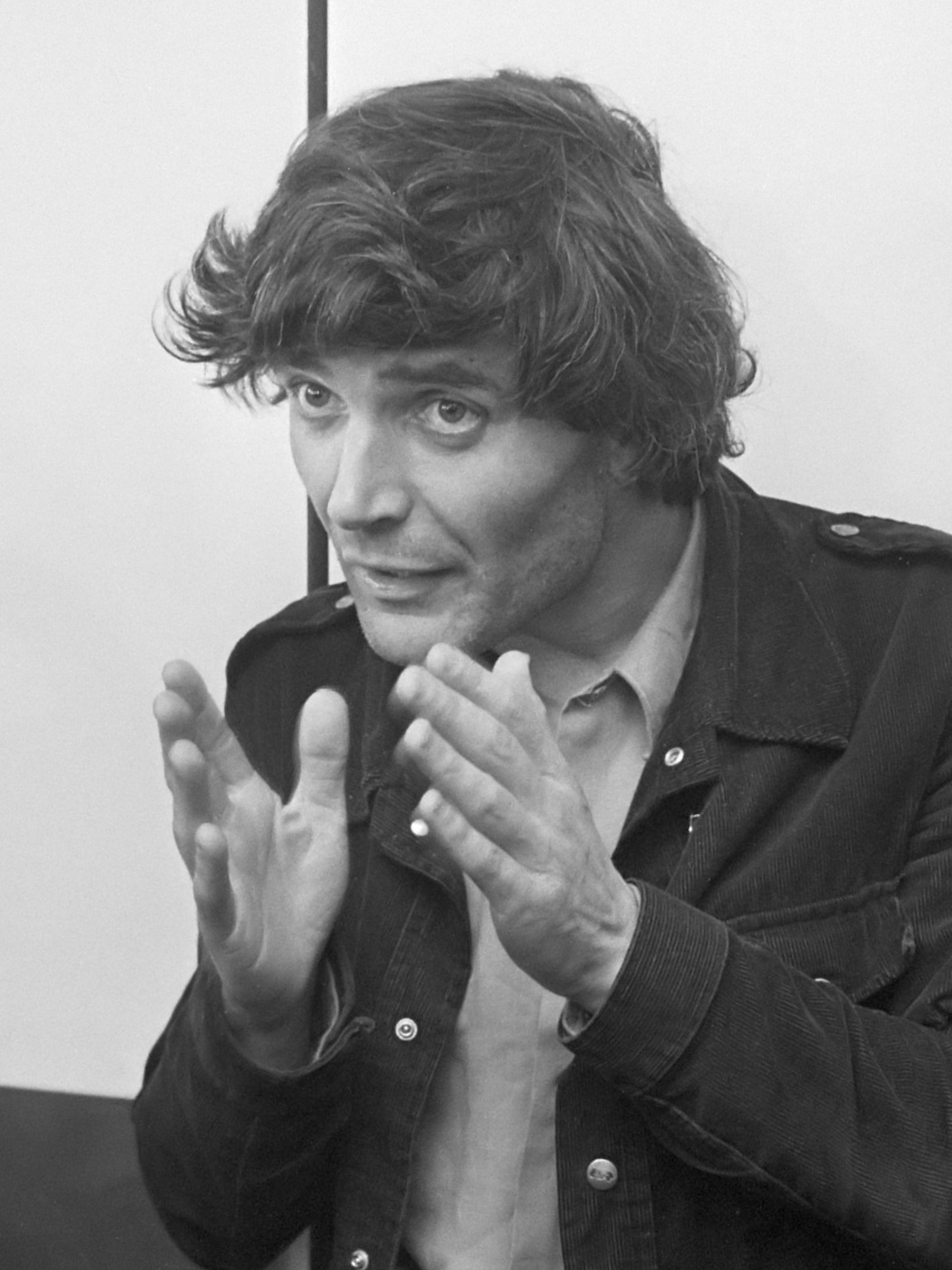
- Koster in 1973
- Born: Jacobus Andries Koster; 9 January 1936; Sint Annaparochie, Netherlands
- Died: 17 March 1982 (aged 46); Santa Rita, El Salvador
- Cause of death: Murdered
- Education: Kampen Theological University; Vrije Universiteit Amsterdam
- Occupation: Journalist
- Years active: 1969–1982
- Employer: IKON

Jacobus Andries Koster (Dutch: [koːs ˈkɔstɛr]; 9 January 1936 – 17 March 1982) was a Dutch journalist who covered events and wars in Latin America between 1969 and his murder in El Salvador in 1982.

== Early life ==
Jacobus Andries Koster was born on 9 January 1936 in Sint Annaparochie, Netherlands. He had four brothers and seven sisters. His father was a Protestant minister at the church in Sint Annaparochie, and in 1957, he began attending the Kampen Theological University to become a minister like his father. He completed his studies in 1963 and became a vicar for a Dutch community in Berlin. In 1970, he edited the book The Stepchild of Europe rejecting the political system of the German Democratic Republic, and that same year, he graduated from the Vrije Universiteit Amsterdam.

== Journalism in Latin America ==
In 1969, he began working for Radio Noord in Groningen. He began to take an interest in Latin America and was inspired by Brazilian bishop Hélder Câmara and Colombian priest Camilo Torres Restrepo as they spoke against the actions of their respective governments during the Cold War. He became a journalist and began working for Interkerkelijke Omroep Nederland (IKON).

In September 1973, he reported on the events of the 1973 Chilean coup d'état led by Augusto Pinochet against Salvador Allende. He was arrested on 20 September 1973 and was held in the Estadio Nacional.

== Journalism in El Salvador ==
He began to be interested in the Salvadoran Civil War after Archbishop Óscar Romero was assassinated on 24 March 1980 while presiding over mass in San Salvador. In El Salvador, journalists were targeted and murdered, which increased Koster's interest in covering the civil war himself.

=== Murder ===
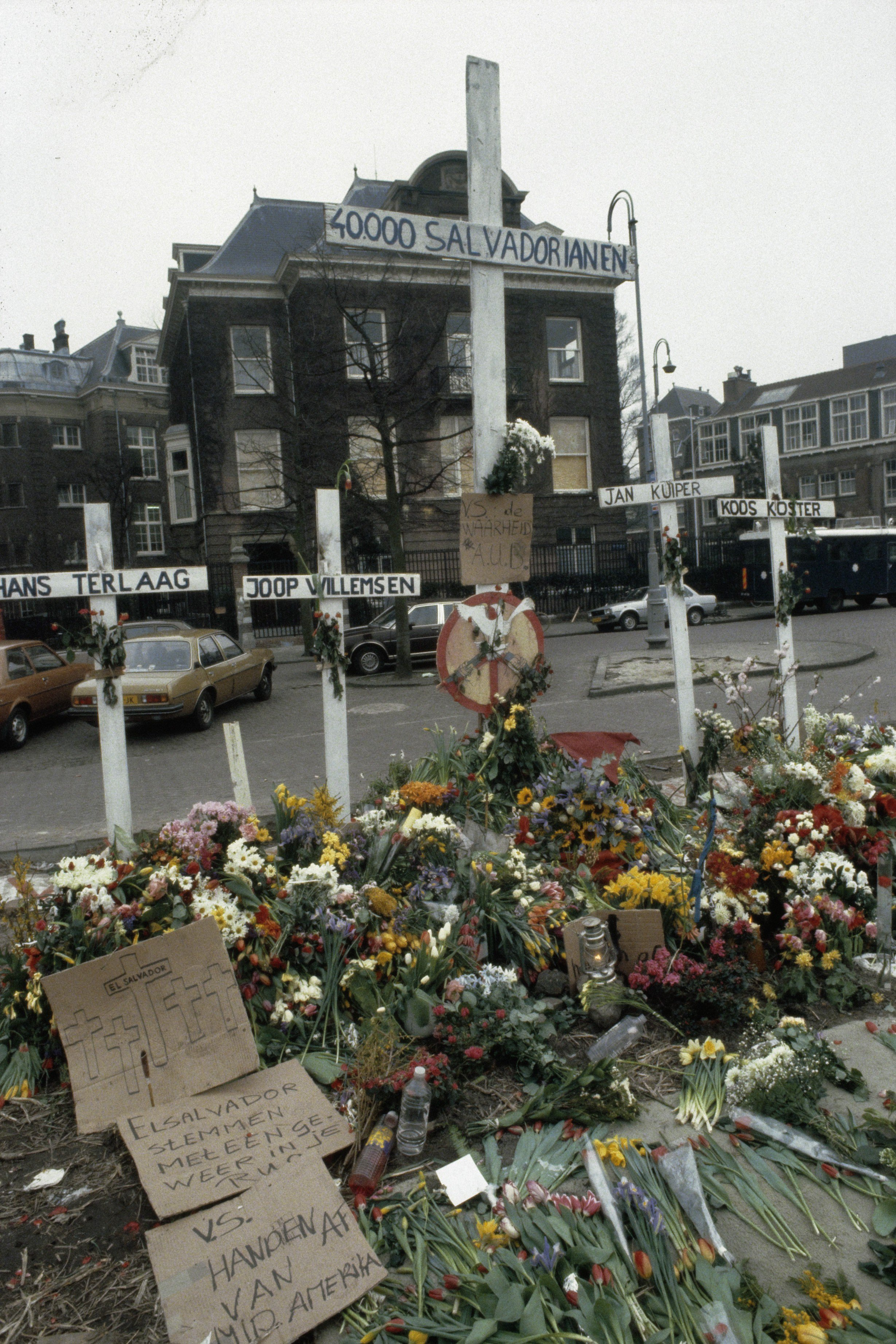
A memorial in Amsterdam for the 4 journalists and 40,000 victims of the civil war.

On 24 February 1982, Koster and three other Dutch journalists working for IKON, Jan Cornelius Kuiper, Johannes "Joop" Jan Willemsen, and Hans Lodewijk ter Laag, arrived in San Salvador. On 17 March 1982, the Dutch journalists traveled to Chalatenango to join with guerrillas of the Farabundo Martí National Liberation Front (FMLN) and film the combat of the civil war. When they met the guerrillas in the municipality of Santa Rita, they were ambushed by soldiers of the Salvadoran Army and killed.

=== Aftermath and legal proceedings ===
News of the massacre in the Netherlands provoked demonstrations which called for the removal of the Revolutionary Government Junta of El Salvador which they deemed responsible for the massacre. The Army denied that the journalists were massacred, instead stating that they were killed in crossfire, and José Napoleón Duarte, the President of the Revolutionary Government Junta, visited the site on 25 March 1982 and stated that he believed the killings were an accident. A memorial was erected in Amsterdam on 16 April 1982 in memory of the four journalists and the 40,000 victims of the civil war up to that point.

In 1993, the United Nations' Truth Commission for El Salvador identified Colonel Mario Aldaberto Reyes Mena of the Salvadoran Army as having ordered the massacre, however, because of an amnesty bill passed in 1993, Reyes Mena was not able to be charged with ordering the massacre. In 2016, however, the Supreme Court of El Salvador found the 1993 amnesty bill to be unconstitutional. On 16 July 2021, human rights organizations in Dulce Nombre de María filed a criminal complaint against Reyes Mena and twenty-five ex-soldiers, accusing them of organizing and carrying out the massacre. On 3 June 2025, Reyes Mena, along with former Defense Minister José Guillermo García and former treasury police director Francisco Morán were convicted by a jury in Chalatenango for the deaths of Koster and the other journalists and sentenced to 15 years' imprisonment.
