= Santa Rita massacre =

Massacre in El Salvador in 1982

- Part of the Salvadoran Civil War
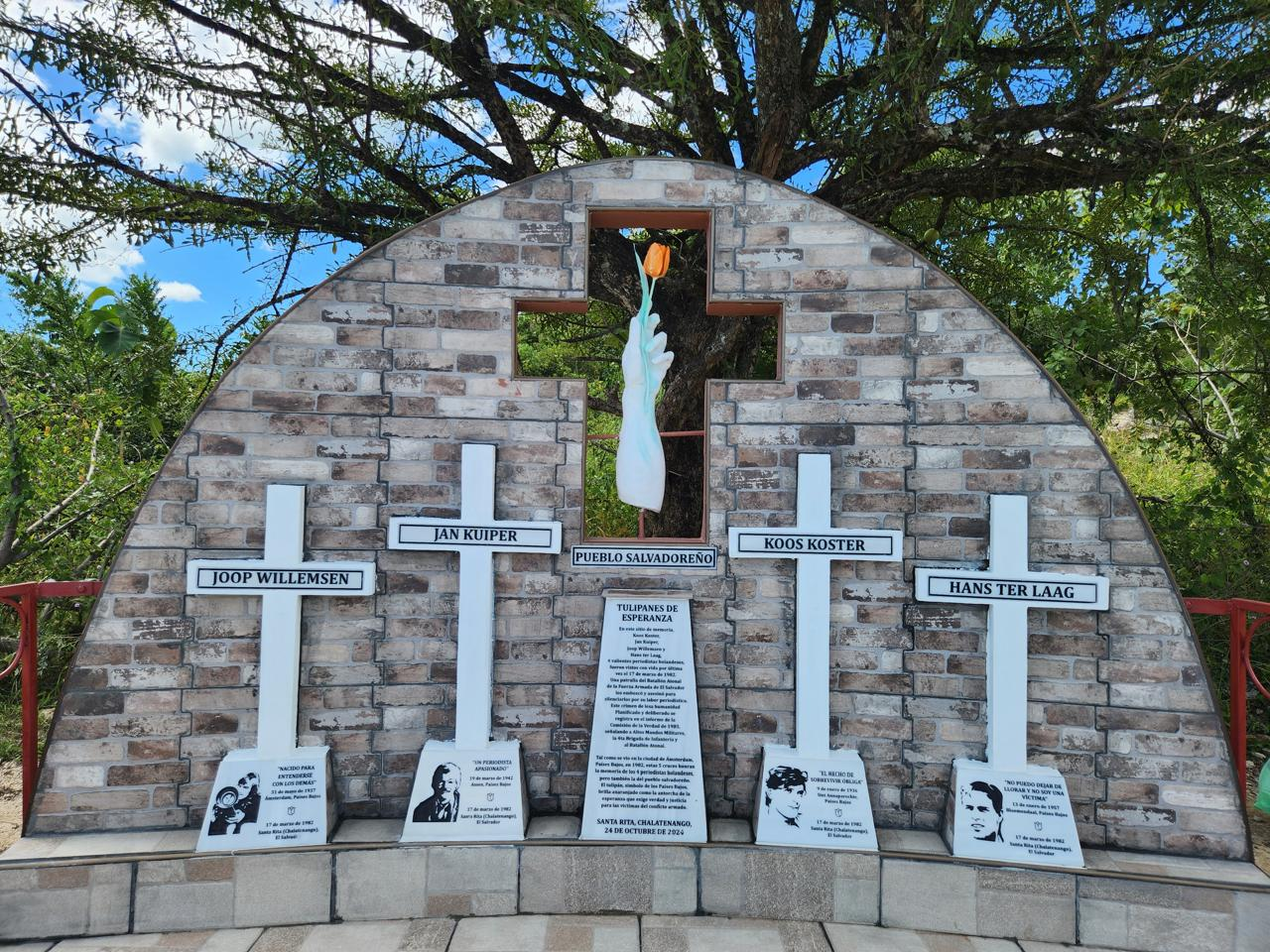
- A memorial to the massacre
- Location: 14°05′35″N 89°01′58″W; Near Santa Rita, El Salvador
- Date: 17 March 1982; Around 5:00 p.m. (–6 UTC)
- Target: Dutch journalists FMLN guerrillas
- Attack type: Massacre
- Weapons: M16s and M60s
- Deaths: 8
- Injuries: 1
- Perpetrator: Atonal Battalion
- Convicted: José Guillermo García; Francisco Antonio Morán; Mario Adalberto Reyes Mena

The Santa Rita massacre (Spanish: masacre de Santa Rita) occurred near the municipality of Santa Rita in Chalatenango, El Salvador, on 17 March 1982. During the massacre, soldiers from the Atonal Battalion attacked and killed four Dutch journalists and a disputed number of guerrillas from the Farabundo Martí National Liberation Front (FMLN).

== Background ==
On 15 October 1979, a faction of the Salvadoran Army overthrew the government of General Carlos Humberto Romero in a bloodless coup d'état. The military established the Revolutionary Government Junta (JRG) which governed the country from 18 October 1979 until the democratization of El Salvador on 2 May 1982. During the JRG's governance in El Salvador, far-right death squads operated in the country and terrorized the civilian population. The paramilitaries and death squads targeted rural peasants, journalists, and human rights workers, labeling them as guerrillas and co-combatants of the Farabundo Martí National Liberation Front (FMLN).

== Dutch journalists ==
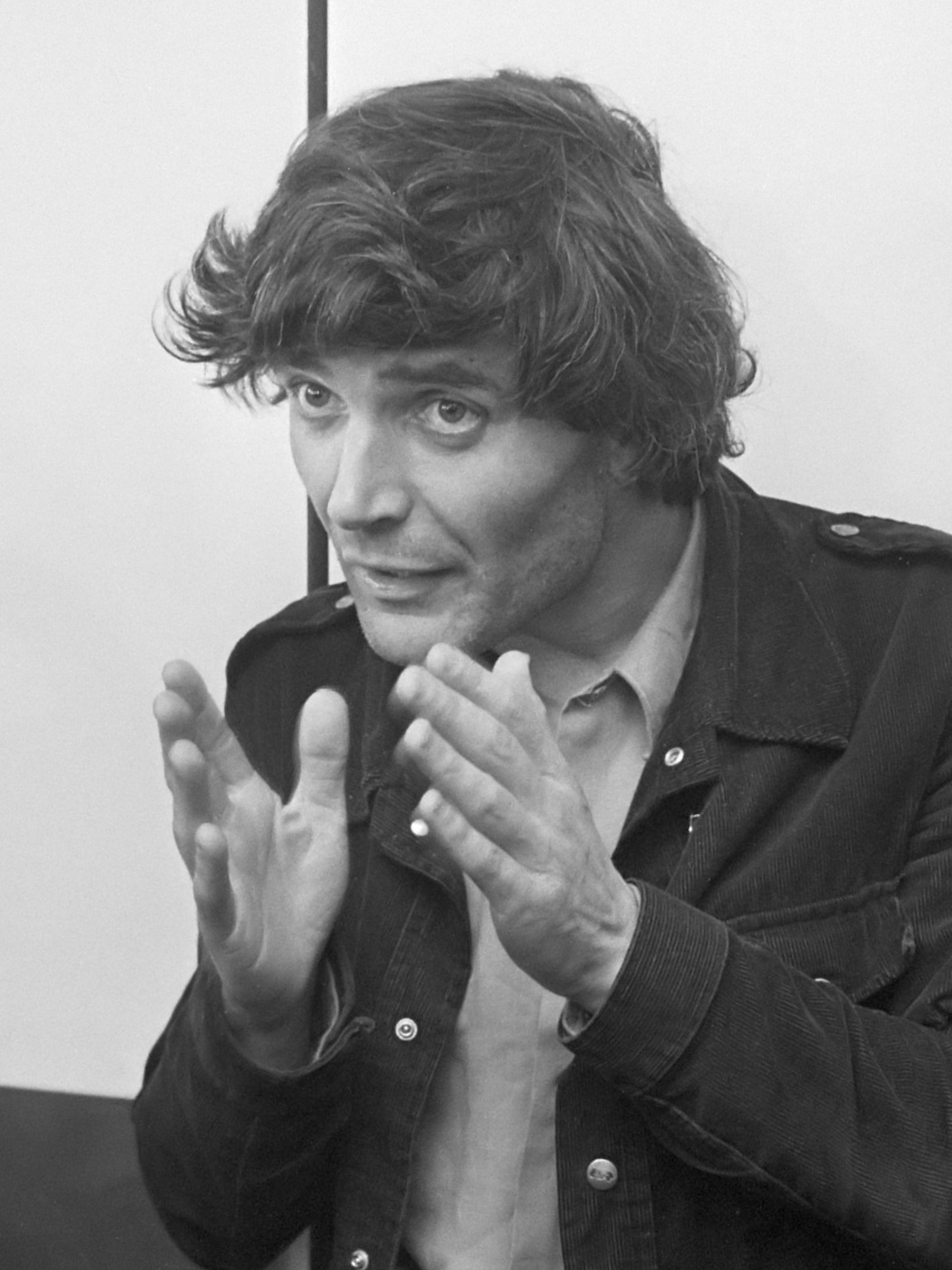
Koos Koster in 1973.

On 24 February 1982, four Dutch journalists arrived at the Hotel Alameda in San Salvador in preparations to do reporting on the ongoing Salvadoran Civil War. The journalists were working for Interkerkelijke Omroep Nederland (IKON), a Dutch public broadcaster. The Dutch journalists were:

- Jacobus Andries Koster (9 January 1936 – 17 March 1982), producer
- Jan Cornelius Kuiper (19 March 1942 – 17 March 1982), director
- Johannes "Joop" Jan Willemsen (31 March 1937 – 17 March 1982), cameraman
- Hans Lodewijk ter Laag (13 January 1957 – 17 March 1982), sound technician

The journalists were arrested by the Treasury Police on 11 March for making contact with FMLN guerrillas. They were questioned for around four to five hours and then released. Koster later made remarks of his arrest saying, "it was just another way for the military to intimidate us into discontinuing our reports on El Salvador." A few days later, the Maximiliano Hernández Martínez Anti-Communist Brigade, a far-right death squad named after former President Maximiliano Hernández Martínez, published a list of 35 journalists they intended to kill for being "Soviet-Cuban-Sandinist accomplices," but none of the Dutch journalists were on the list. The fact that none of the men were on the list convinced Koster to continue with his team's reporting despite the others being concerned about the situation. The team planned to head for Chalatenango, an area that was mostly held by the guerrillas, on Wednesday 17 March to film the fighting in the area.

== Massacre ==
The journalists left the hotel for Chalatenango at 3:00 p.m. on 17 March. They picked up "Commander Óscar", a commander of the Farabundo Martí Popular Liberation Forces, and "Rubén", a child soldier who was their guide for the trip in San Salvador. At around 4 p.m., the crew stopped at a bridge colloquially called "the Golden Bridge", which marked the border between government and guerrilla territory, and they filmed themselves with the soldiers guarding the bridge.

When the crew passed the El Paraíso barracks, they noticed a jeep began to follow them but it eventually went away. At around 5 p.m., the journalists and their guide turned off the main road and drove up a road called Calle Santa Rita connecting El Paraíso to Cantón Piedras Gordas, Santa Rita, and San Rafael, where they met 3 more guerrillas named "Martín," "Carlos," and "Tello," after which, their driver, Armin Wertz, returned to San Salvador since they planned to stay with the guerrillas for several days. The 9 men walked into the jungle, but they were ambushed by the army with 8 of the being killed. "Martín" was the only survivor. According to Thomas Buergenthal, a member of the United Nations' Truth Commission for El Salvador, "the military waited for them and basically executed them." Their driver was notified of the massacre at 7am the next day. The bodies of the journalists were returned to San Salvador.

== Aftermath ==
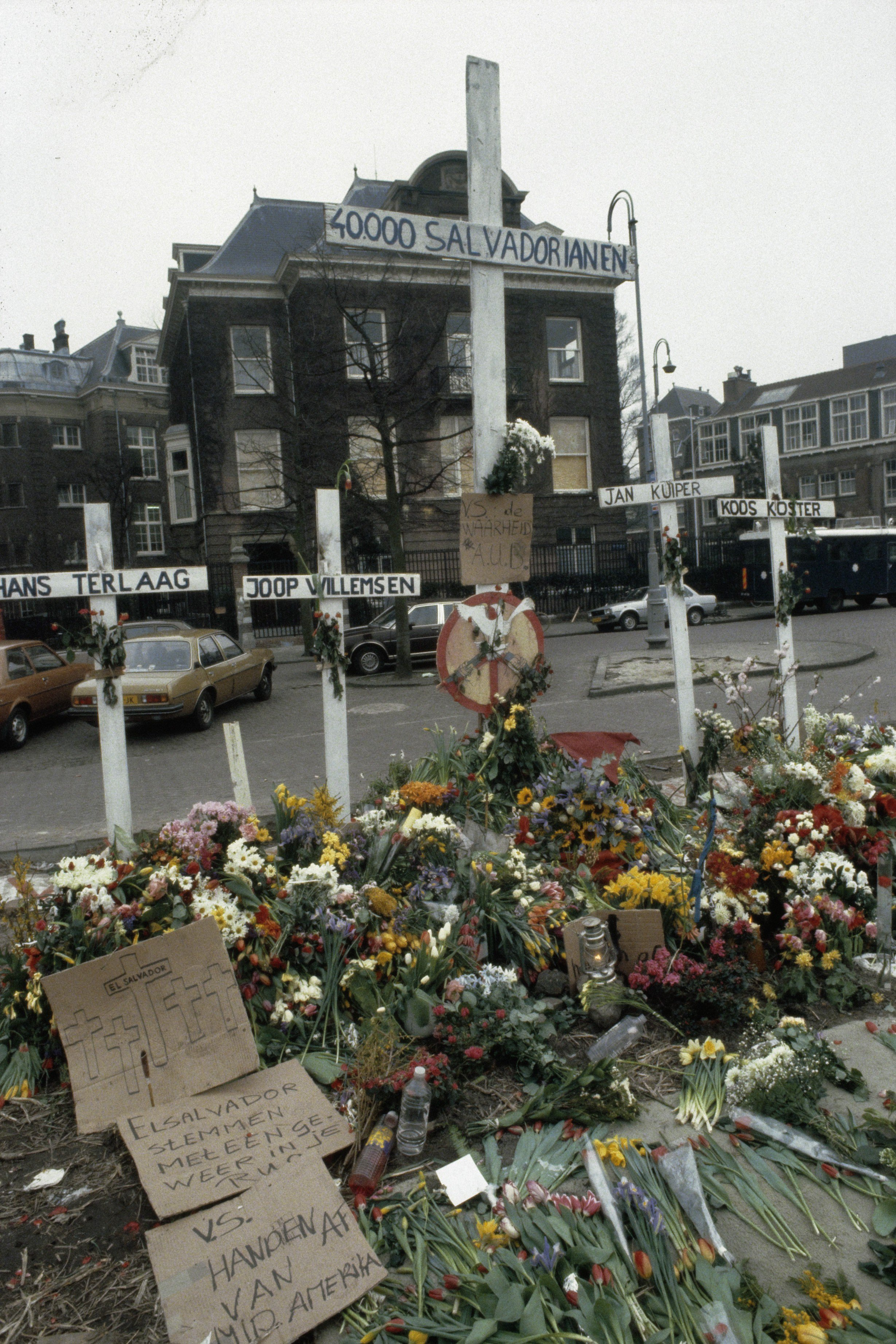
A memorial in Amsterdam for the 4 journalists and 40,000 victims of the civil war.

News of the massacre was broadcast in the Netherlands on 18 March which sparked demonstrations calling for the removal of the junta. A memorial for the journalists and the 40,000 victims of the civil war was created in Amsterdam on 16 April. The Salvadoran Army stated that there was not an ambush or a massacre, but instead, the journalists were caught in crossfire between the army and the guerrillas. José Napoleón Duarte, the president of the JRG, visited the site and stated on 25 March, "it was not a premeditated act, in my opinion, it was an accident".

On 15 March 2023, Vamos deputy Claudia Ortiz presented a proposal to the Legislative Assembly to hold a moment of silence to commemorate the journalists' deaths, stating "their only crime was to tell the truth about what was occurring in our country and reporting the abuses of the State against the civil population during the armed conflict" ("su único crimen fue decir la verdad sobre lo que ocurría en nuestro país reportando los abusos del Estado hacia la población civil durante el conflicto armado"). As the proposal only received 12 votes in favor—with the remaining 72 not voting—it failed to pass.

== Legal proceedings ==
The Dutch conducted an investigation into the incident and came to the conclusion that it was in fact a massacre. They also discovered that US soldiers were present at the base the day of the massacre. The United Nations conducted their own investigation in 1993 and identified Colonel Mario Adalberto Reyes Mena as the man who ordered the ambush. The Truth Commission stated that the attack violated international human rights law and international humanitarian law. However, due to an amnesty bill passed in 1993, Reyes Mena was never arrested nor charged with the massacre. Bruce Hazelwood, an American military trainer present at the barracks that day, confirmed that the army knew about the meeting between the journalists and the guerrillas and that they planned an ambush. He confirmed Reyes Mena ordered the attack.

A new Dutch organization, ZEMBLA, tracked down Reyes Mena using declassified U.S. documents. Reyes Mena left El Salvador for the United States in 1984 where he since lived in Virginia. Journalists interviewed him at his home on 24 September 2018 but he defended himself stating that both Duarte and the U.S. had conducted investigations but found no evidence of him having ordered the massacre. He accused the journalists of never telling the truth and being part of a communist conspiracy.

In 2016, the 1993 amnesty law was repealed after it was found to be unconstitutional by the Supreme Court. Since then, the Fundación Comunicándonos and the Salvadoran Association for Human Rights (ASDEHU) have been pushing for justice for the Dutch journalists. Raquel de Guevara from the Human Rights Advocate of El Salvador announced that they would also be seeking justice for the journalists. Dutch civilians have also wanted Reyes Mena to be prosecuted. Those seeking justice remain hopeful since José Guillermo García, another Salvadoran war criminal, was extradited to El Salvador in 2016. However, since 2019, legislators have been pushing for a new amnesty bill.

On 16 July 2021, human rights organizations in Dulce Nombre de María filed a criminal complaint against Reyes Mena and twenty-five ex-soldiers, accusing them of organizing and carrying out the massacre. On 16 October 2022, Salvadoran judge María Mercedes Arguello ordered the arrests of several retired military officials, including José Guillermo García and Colonel Francisco Antonio Morán, in relation to the massacre. She also ordered the extradition of Reyes Mena to El Salvador in relation to the case. A criminal chamber ratified the rulings and confirmed the arrest warrants against García, Morán, and Reyes Mena on 23 December 2022.

On 3 June 2025, a jury in Chalatenango convicted Reyes Mena, Morán, and García for the massacre. The following month, they were each sentenced to 60 years imprisonment, 15 years for each of the journalists killed.

== See also ==
- El Calabozo massacre
- El Mozote massacre
- Sumpul River massacre
