= El Carrizal =

- District
- Location in El Salvador
- Coordinates: 14°10′N 88°52′W
- Country: El Salvador
- Department: Chalatenango
- Municipality: Chalatenango Sur
- Elevation: 1,512 ft (461 m)

Population (2024)
  - District: 2,235
  - Rank: 246th in El Salvador
  - Rural: 2,235

El Carrizal is a municipality located in the department of Chalatenango in northern El Salvador. It is bordered to the north and east by Honduras, to the southeast by Ojos de Agua and Las Vueltas, and to the west and northwest by La Laguna. It has a territorial extension of 25.32 km^{2}. It is administratively divided into four cantons and 22 caseríos.

== History ==
The civilization of El Salvador dates from the Pre-Columbian Era, from around 1500 BC, according to experts. On May 31, 1522, the first of the Spanish, under the leadership of Captain Pedro de Alvarado, disembarked on the Isla Meanguera, located in the Gulf of Fonseca. In June 1524, Captain Alvarado began a war of conquest against the Indigenous people of Cuzcatlán (land of precious things). After 17 days of bloody battles, many people died, but the Spanish were not defeated, so they continued their conquest. During the following centuries, the Spanish maintained their control, with European families controlling the land as well as the native and African enslaved people. Towards the end of 1810, Priest José Matías Delgado, with the support of many people, began a rebellion. After years of struggle, the Central American Independence Act was signed in Guatemala, on September 15, 1821.

According to don Antonio Gutiérrez y Ulloa, in 1807, El Carrizal was a prosperous village of non-indigenous peoples near Chalatenango, on the road "Gracias a Dios" ("Thanks to God"). According to the law, on February 18, 1841, the village of El Carrizal, along with those of Vainillas and Petapa, constituted one of the electoral cantons which divided El Salvador.

From June 12, 1824, to May 22, 1835, it belonged to the department of San Salvador; from May 22 until February 14, 1855, it was a part of Cuscatlán; and from this date on, it has formed a part of the department of Chalatenango. Many families from El Carrizal descend from Honduran families, specifically from Guarita and other towns in the Lempira Department.

Due to the repression of the landowners, farmers and indigenous citizens began a rebellion in 1931. The army responded by killing 30,000 people, including the leader of the rebellion, Farabundo Martí, in a bloody act that was later referred to as La Matanza (lit. 'The Massacre' in Spanish). But the people remained unhappy with the government. This began a movement organized around leftist guerrillas to combat the state repression and violence. The government responded with violence, and the Death Squads were formed, which eventually tortured and killed thousands of people. More political instability and the assassination of Archbishop Óscar Romero in 1980 sparked the beginning of the Salvadoran Civil War. This war, which lasted 12 years, resulted in the death of an estimated 75,000 people and the displacement of thousands more. The Peace Accords were signed on January 16, 1992.

The department of Chalatenango was heavily impacted by the Civil War. Many people of El Carrizal were forced to abandon their homes because of the violence. But beginning in the early 1990s, and especially after the Peace Accords, the people have returned to repopulate the municipality.

== Demographics ==
In 1992, according to the national census, the population of El Carrizal was 2,727. 523 people (19%) were urban, and 2,234 people (81%) were rural. According to the information given by community leaders, in August 2004 there were 2,806 inhabitants; 54% were women and 46% were men, and there was a total of 618 families. (Tomado de: Plan Participativo de Desarrollo con Proyección Estratégica, Municipio El Carrizal Departamento de Chalatenango, FUNDAMUNI, PROCAP, El Salvador octubre 2004)

== Cantons and caseríos ==
Many of the caseríos are now uninhabited since the Civil War, such as Sitio Vado Las Cañas, Sitios Las Cañas, Crujillitas, and Pucuyo. At the same time there are now newly populated areas that are not identified as official caseríos, such as El Camalote-Brisas de la Paz or El Plan de Abajo.

The urban center and all of the cantons have Asociaciones de Desarrollo Comunal (Associations for Community Development—ADESCOS). In addition, all of the rural schools have ACE and the school in the urban area has a CDE. There are also several different committees and boards that administer water services and sports activities. In total there are 630 houses in the municipality. 200 (32%) are made of cement blocks, brick, and cement; 422 (67%) are made out of adobe; and 8 (1%) are made of a material similar to adobe, called bahareque.

- Cantón Vanillas: named because there used to be vanilla (vanilla) plants
- Potrerillo: named because there used to be big areas of land used as pastures (potreros).
- Petapa: named because the patron saint is Santa Marta de Petapa
- Petapita: or valley of the Saints, named after the extended family named Santos (Saints) that lives there.
- Petapon: the location of the church and the centre of Cantón Petapa
- Junta: the place where the Río Sumpul and the Río La Garza join (“junta” means “together”)
- La Quesera: a caserío in Petapa where they used to make cheese (queso)

=== Trinidad ===
- Trinidad,
- Aldea Vieja,
- Santa Cruz,
- Callejones,
- Sitio Las Cañas,
- Sitio Vado Las Cañas,
- Sitio Viejo

=== Petapa ===
- Petapa,
- Petapita,
- Sitio Vado Olosingo,
- La Junta,
- Valle Los Santos,
- La Quesera

=== Potrerillos ===
- Potrerillos,
- Los Planes,
- Teosinte,
- San Cristóbal
- El Teosinte,
- Crujillitas,
- El Limón

=== Vainillas ===
- Vainillas,
- El Limo,
- El Pucuyo

== Politics ==
There are two main political parties in El Salvador, whose roots lie in the Civil War. The main right-wing party is La Alianza Republicana Nacionalista (Nactionalist Republican Alliance—ARENA), founded on September 30, 1981, and was in power during the last few years of the Civil War. The Frente Farabundo Marti para La Liberacion Nacional (Farabundo Martí National Liberation Front—FMLN), the socialist party, is the direct descendant of the guerrilla troops that fought against the Salvadoran government, and was legally constituted as a political party on September 1, 1992.

Since the Civil War, the two have remained the country's principal political parties, still divided by the left-right binary. Today ARENA describes itself as a party in which “forming principals express that a democratic and representational system, which guarantees the freedom of action and the consequences of individual peaceful goals, are the quickest and stablest path to achieve integral development of the nation”. The FMLN “has begun to take steps…to act as a consequence of the historically created challenges, in order to make the party an organization of 'social fighters…'and ‘to unify more’ the struggle for power." Other political parties in El Salvador include the Christian Democratic Party, the United Democratic Center, and the Party of National Conciliation.

The mayor of El Carrizal is Tulio Ernesto Casco, of the FMLN party.

== Religion ==
In El Salvador, 83% of the population identifies as Roman Catholic, and the other 17% identify as "other". However, in the last few years, the population of Catholics has declined. There is a lot of Protestant activity in the country, and El Salvador has one of the highest rates of Protestantism in Latin America (Soltero y Saravia 2003:1).

There is no doubt that religion plays an important role in the lives of many people. Patron saints and other religious festivals are still very important and celebrated in almost all of the municipalities in the country, and almost all the cantones have their own patron saint in whose honor the festival is celebrated.

== Patron Saint and traditional festivals ==
- El Carrizal: December 4–8, in honor of the immaculate conception of Mary
- Petapa: June 13, in honor of San Antonio.
- Caserío Petapita: May 13, in honor of the Virgin Fátima
- Potrerillos: June 6, in honor of the Sacred Heart of Jesus
- Caserío Los Planes: December 27, in honor of the Niño Jesus
- Vainillas: October 4, in honor of San Francisco de Asís; November 21–22, in honor of St. Christopher
- Cantón Trinidad: May 27–28, in honor of the Divine Trinity

== Music and dances ==
Before, only rancheras and some boleros were heard. Popular instruments included mandolins, guitars, accordions, marimbas, and violins. There were also drums made out of leather. This music is now no longer heard.

La Raspa used to be a popular dance.

== Agricultural production ==
Traditionally, the area has produced corn and beans. In individual farms, people plant beans, different types of local squash, tomatoes, loroco, blackberries, cucumber, yucca, jicama, herbs, and peppers. One can still see the remains of sugar cane mills.

== Food and drink ==
Traditional foods include beans, tortillas, metas, soups, sweets, and seeds. Other traditional foods and dishes include:

- During the corn harvest they make atole and tamales.
- Montucas, which are corn tamales filled with meat and vegetables.
- Bean soup with chopped mangoes.
- Potocs, which are balls of corn dough which are added to the beans when they are cooking.
- Tamales pisques, which are made to last for long travel.
- Pupusas (a stuffed corn tortilla) with beans and oregano.
- After going fishing they make fish pupusas.

The majority of the ingredients used to make these foods and drinks are natural and are grown in the area. They also form part of the biodiversity that, in some cases, is threatened or in danger of extinction. Nevertheless, these habits are less common as more people eat commercially produced foods.

== Tourism sites ==
- The natural pools of Sumpul River.
- In the stream El Rodeo there are waterfalls. There is also a natural pool and cave underneath the waterfall, which actually is located in Honduras.
- In the forest of La Montañona, there is a commonly owned piece of land which belongs to the municipality.
- The caves of Piedra Gato
- The Piedra del Gallinero, which according to the populace is the home of a little boy of a famous local legend.
- The Bat Cave that is located below Vainillas and Sumpul.

== Artisan products ==
- In Petapa they make hammocks.
- There are two places that make ironworks and machetes (made by Don Pedro Santos 1925–2007); these are permanent productions in the municipality
- There are people who can make pottery, such as: pots, water jugs, tortilla pans, and whistles.
- Among other artisanal works, there are people who can make the following: candies out of fruit, caramel, coconut conserve, chocolate, and donkey milk; dolls out of corn husks; paper crowns; woven mats; soaps of olives, beans, and avocado; alcoholic drinks, mild and strong.
- Before, they used to make drums out of leather that were used at festivals; today one can still find older people who make and play them.

== Archaeological sites ==
- In Camalote, in the Cooperative “Breezes of Peace,” there are rocks, pots, and cups. There is also a knoll where people have found fire stones.
- In Cantón Potrerillos they have found pots, water jugs, and a rock with a cow footprint engraved.
- In Ciprés there is a rock that sounds like a bell.
- In Sumpul River there is obsidian in some of the large rocks near Petapa
- In Cantón Trinidad there are rocks with engravings
