= Santa Rita, El Salvador =

Santa Rita
- District
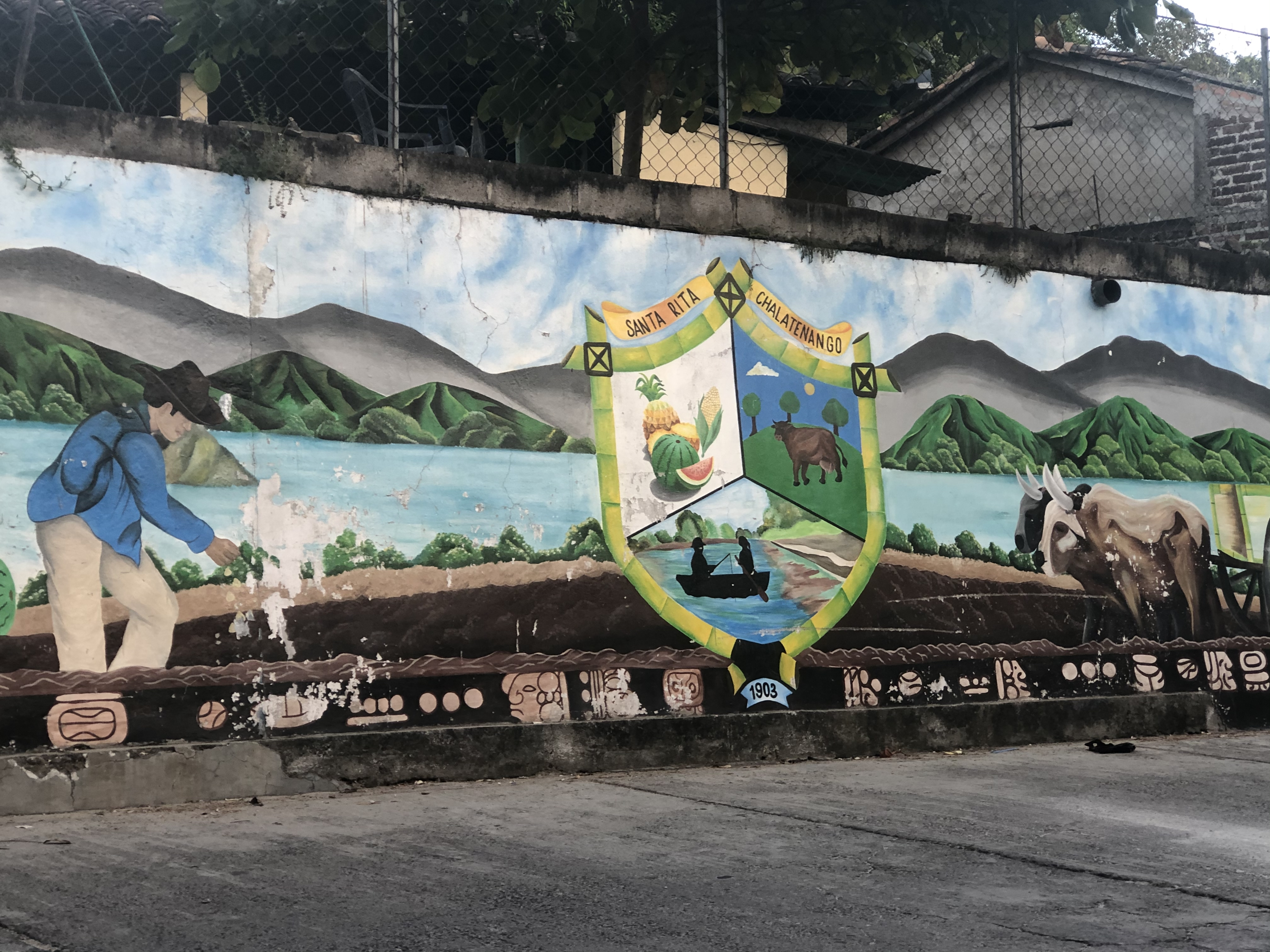

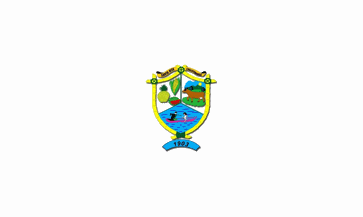
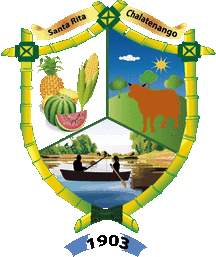
- Flag Seal

- Location in El Salvador
- Coordinates: 14°07′43″N 89°00′18″W
- Country: El Salvador
- Department: Chalatenango
- Municipality: Chalatenango Centro
- Established: 1807 or 1822
- Disestablished: 12 May 1902
- Reestablished: 28 April 1903
- Named for: Rita of Cascia

Area
  - District: 20.52 sq mi (53.14 km^{2})
- Elevation: 1,257 ft (383 m)

Population (2024)
  - District: 4,298
  - Rank: 205th in El Salvador
  - Density: 209.5/sq mi (80.88/km^{2})
  - Urban: 1,430
  - Rural: 2,868
- Time zone: UTC–6

Santa Rita is a district in the Chalatenango Department of El Salvador and is one of the largest municipalities of Chalatenango. It has a shoreline on Lake Suchitlán and is bordered by the municipalities of Comalapa, Dulce Nombre de María, Concepción Quezaltepeque, El Paraíso, and San Rafael.

== History ==
Official reports record the town of Santa Rita being established in 1822, while according to Colonial Intendant Antonio Gutiérrez y Ulloa, it was established in 1807. Santa Rita was a part of San Salvador from its establishment until 13 May 1833, after which it was transferred to Chalatenango under the administration of Tejutla until being returned to San Salvador on 21 October 1833. In 1835, it was transferred to Cuscatlán and was incorporated into El Salvador in 1841.

On 1 November 1846, General Francisco Malespín defeated Salvadoran soldiers under Joaquín Peralta, who were loyal to President Eugenio Aguilar, in battle in Santa Rita during his war to retake the presidency. Santa Ana transferred a final time to Chalatenango in 1855. It was dissolved on 12 May 1902 and transferred to Dulce Nombre de María on the executive decree of President Tomás Regalado. President Pedro José Escalón reestablished the municipality through an executive decree on 28 April 1903. Another law was passed on 15 July 1919 that reinforced the existence of Santa Rita as separate from both Tejutla and Dulce Nombre de María.

On 17 March 1982, four Dutch journalists and four guerrillas of the Farabundo Martí National Liberation Front (FMLN) were massacred on the road from El Paraíso to Santa Rita by the Atonal Battalion during the Salvadoran Civil War.

== Geography ==
Santa Rita has an elevation of 1,257 feet or 383 meters and is 20.52 square miles or 53.14 square kilometers large. According to Global Forest Watch, from 2001 to 2019, the municipality lost 310 hectares of tree cover, which was a decrease of 18%.

== Population ==
Historical population
Year	Pop.	±%
1890	1,090	—
1956	2,241	+105.6%
2007	5,985	+167.1%
2024	4,298	−28.2%

Santa Rita had a population of 1,090 in 1890 and a population of 2,241 in 1956. In the 2007 census, Santa Rita had a population of 5,985 people, with only 400 or 6.7% living in urban areas and the remainder living in rural areas. There were 1,498 occupied homes with an average of 6 people per household. The 2024 census found that Santa Rita's population had decreased to 4,298.

== Administrative divisions ==
Santa Rita is divided into four cantons and three caseríos:

- Barillas
- El Chilamate
- San Nicolás Piedras Gordas
  - El Tronconal
  - La Rastra
  - Tasajeras
- Tobías

== Mayors of Santa Rita ==
The following table lists all the elected mayors of Santa Rita from 1994 to 2024.

Mayor	Elected	Term of office			Political party	Ref.
Mayor	Elected	Assumed office	Left office	Duration	Political party	Ref.
María Luisa Mena de Guardado	1994	1 May 1994	1 May 1997	3 years and 0 days	Nationalist Republican Alliance	
Adolfo Guardado Vásquez	1997	1 May 1997	1 May 2000	3 years and 0 days	Nationalist Republican Alliance	
Atilio López López	2000	1 May 2000	1 May 2003	3 years and 0 days	Social Christian Union	
Adolfo Guardado Vásquez	2003	1 May 2003	1 May 2006	3 years and 0 days	National Conciliation Party	
Ismael Romero Gutiérrez	2006	1 May 2006	1 May 2024	18 years and 0 days	Nationalist Republican Alliance	
Ismael Romero Gutiérrez	2009	1 May 2006	1 May 2024	18 years and 0 days	Nationalist Republican Alliance	
Ismael Romero Gutiérrez	2012	1 May 2006	1 May 2024	18 years and 0 days	Nationalist Republican Alliance	
Ismael Romero Gutiérrez	2015	1 May 2006	1 May 2024	18 years and 0 days	Nationalist Republican Alliance	
Ismael Romero Gutiérrez	2018	1 May 2006	1 May 2024	18 years and 0 days	Nationalist Republican Alliance	
Ismael Romero Gutiérrez	2021	1 May 2006	1 May 2024	18 years and 0 days	Nationalist Republican Alliance	

== See also ==
- Dulce Nombre de María
