= El Chupadero =

- Location in El Salvador
- Coordinates: 14°14′N 88°59′W
- Country: El Salvador
- Department: Chalatenango Department
- Municipality: Santa Rita, Chalatenango

El Chupadero is a town in the municipality of Santa Rita, Chalatenango, El Salvador. Currently the town is used for agricultural purposes, but it does have houses in which people live. There are two main roads in El Chupadero, the first one leads to the town of Santa Rita, and the second leads to the other little town called Los Marines. The land where El Chupadero is located, is home to Enrique Lopez that was elected mayor for Santa Rita for multiple times.
