= Texis Cartel =

Salvadoran drug trafficking organization

- Cártel de Texis
- Founded: before 1990s
- Founders: Adán Salazar Umaña (alleged); Juan Umaña Samayoa (alleged); Roberto Herrera (alleged)
- Years active: before 1990s–2010s
- Territory: Northern El Salvador: Chalatenango; Santa Ana
- Ethnicity: Salvadorans
- Membership: Unknown
- Activities: Drug trafficking, kidnapping, extortion, money laundering, prostitution, murder
- Allies: Colombian drug cartels Mexican drug cartels

The Texis Cartel (Spanish: Cártel de Texis) is a Salvadoran criminal organization which specializes in drug trafficking operations. As of 2017, the cartel transports drugs manufactured by Colombian drug cartels through northern El Salvador towards North America. The Texis Cartel was allegedly founded in the 1990s by businessman José Adán Salazar Umaña (known by his alias "Chepe Diablo"), politician Juan Umaña Samayoa, and businessman Roberto Herrera. The cartel allegedly bribes Salvadoran law enforcement officers and judicial officials to help its leaders evade identification by Salvadoran authorities.

Herrera was arrested in 2013 and sentenced to three years imprisonment in 2015 for his role in the Texis Cartel. The Texis Cartel ended during the 2010s following the arrests of several of its alleged leaders, including Salazar Umaña and Umaña Samayoa. In 2021, a Salvadoran court found both Salazar Umaña and Umaña Samayoa not guilty of money laundering relating to the Salvadoran government's investigation into the Texis Cartel; both were released, and the case was declared res judicata.

== History ==
=== Establishment ===
According to the organized crime-focused think tank InSight Crime, the Texis Cartel was established before the 1990s in El Salvador. The cartel was allegedly founded by José Adán Salazar Umaña (known by his alias "Chepe Diablo") (a businessman who was the then-president of the First Division of Football of El Salvador), Juan Umaña Samayoa (the then-mayor of Metapán), and Roberto Herrera (a businessman). The Texis Cartel allegedly trafficked drugs from Honduras, through northern El Salvador, and to Guatemala. Salazar allegedly used his various businesses to money launder. The cartel also allegedly received further support from Armando Portillo Portillo (the then-mayor of Texistepeque), Reynaldo Cardoza (a legislator of the Legislative Assembly of El Salvador from Chalatenango), and Óscar Ortiz, the then-mayor of Santa Tecla and future vice president of El Salvador.

=== Government investigation ===
The Salvadoran government began investigating the Texis Cartel's operations in 2000. According to InSight Crime, the Texis Cartel's supposed connections to high-ranking Salvadoran politicians helped the group's leaders evade detention from Salvadoran law enforcement agencies by obstructing investigations. In 2011, the United Nations confirmed that the Texis Cartel, along with the Los Perrones drug trafficking group, had received protection from Salvadoran government officials. The Texis Cartel also allegedly bribed soldiers and police officers to allow drug shipments to proceed; and judges and prosecutors to not pursue criminal charges against the cartel's members.

In 2011, the digital newspaper El Faro published an article which accused Salazar Umaña and Umaña Samayoa of being the cartel's founders. Both denied El Faro's accusations. Following the release of El Faro's report, President Mauricio Funes announced that there was enough evidence to conduct a full investigation into the Texis Cartel. In 2013, Minister of National Defense David Munguía Payés claimed that no drug cartels existed in El Salvador, and that any cartel activity in the country were "cells" that belonged to foreign drug cartels. Later that year, he acknowledged the existence of the Texis Cartel, describing it as a "baby cartel". In 2014, the United States listed Salazar Umaña on its Drug Kingpin List, but removed him in 2017 due to a lack of evidence.

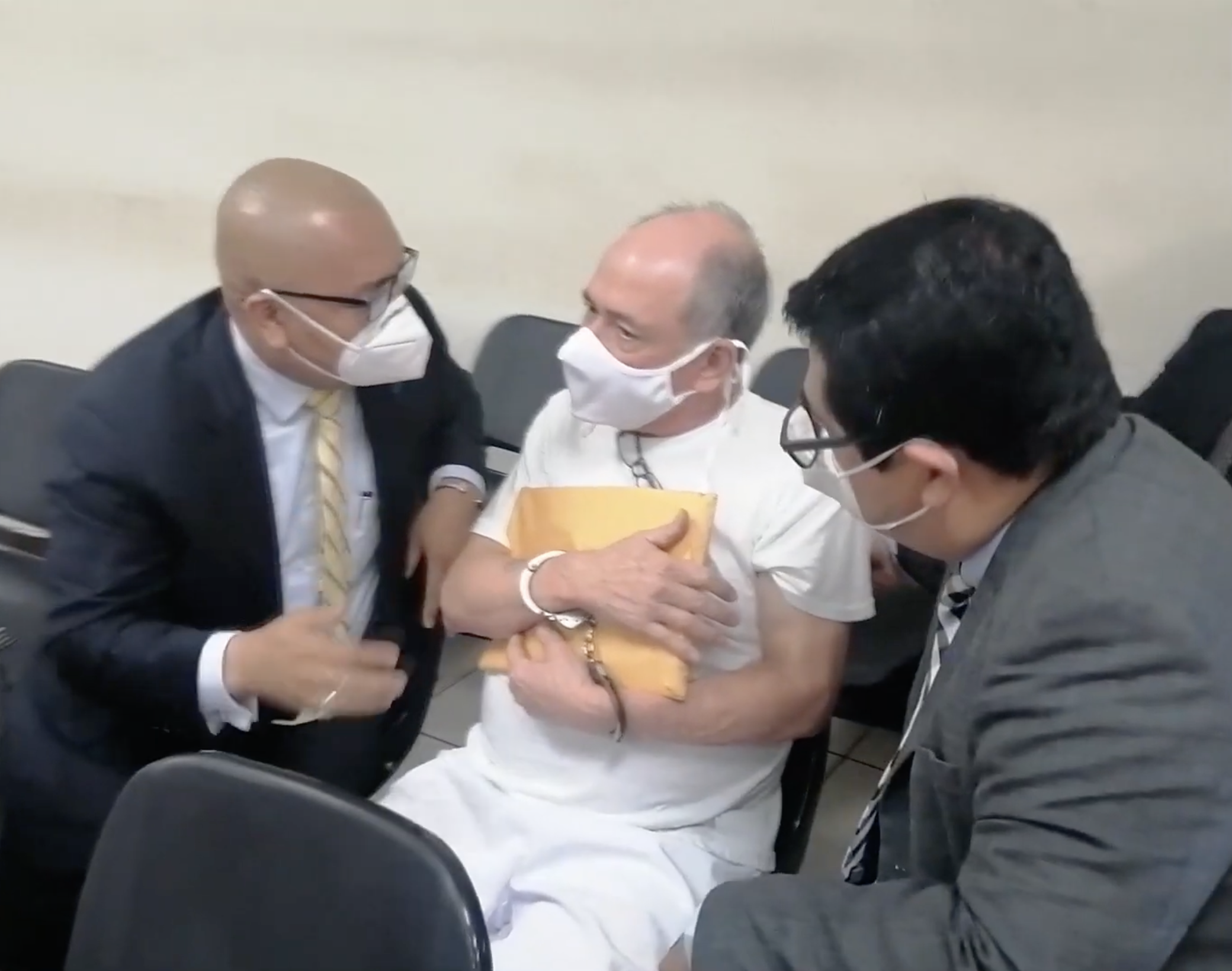
Juan Umaña Samayoa in 2020 during a pre-trial hearing regarding his alleged involvement in the Texis Cartel

In 2011, Herrera was detained by the National Civil Police for his alleged ties to the Texis Cartel. He was charged with being allegedly involved in a car theft scheme which supposedly stole 300 cars in Guatemala, however, a Salvadoran court acquitted him of all charges in 2014. In 2015, a court ordered a retrial for Herrera on the same charges. Herrera claimed that the Texis Cartel did not exist nor did it smuggle drugs. In 2015, Herrera was found guilty and sentenced to three years imprisonment, but this sentence was later reduced to one year.

On 4 April 2017, Salazar Umaña was arrested in an operation by the National Civil Police under orders of the Office of the Attorney General (FGR). He was charged with alleged money laundering and tax evasion in relation to the FGR's investigation into the Texis Cartel. Umaña Samayoa evaded arrest during the operation, but he was eventually arrested in 2018. In October 2020, both men along with seven other co-defendants went on trial, accused by the FGR of allegedly laundering US$500 million in connection to its investigation into the Texis Cartel, however, all defendants were found not guilty by the Second Penal Court on 21 May 2021 and released. The court declared the case to be res judicata. It also annulled the FGR's actions against all defendants due to a lack of standing.

== Operations ==
According to InSight Crime, the Texis Cartel does not have a hierarchical leadership structure; instead, it supposedly operates as a coalition between various individuals who oversee certain aspects of the cartel. The cartel allegedly utilizes its business connections to help launder money and receive indirect loans from the Salvadoran government worth up to hundreds of thousands of United States dollars. The Texis Cartel is, as of 2017, allegedly headquartered in Metapán, Santa Ana in northern El Salvador. The cartel allegedly helps Colombian drug cartels move drugs through Central America towards North America; it receives drug shipments in northern El Salvador in San Fernando and Dulce Nombre de María, moves it by truck through Chalatenango along the Northern Longitudinal Highway, and exports it to Guatemala out of Metapán. This route is known as the "Northern Route" or "The Little Pathway" ("El Caminito"). The Texis Cartel allegedly bribes several mayors and businessmen along this route to allow drug shipments to remain unhindered.

According to InSight Crime, Texis Cartel primarily specializes in drug trafficking operations. The cartel also allegedly operates prostitution rings and engaged in extortion and kidnapping. The Texis Cartel has an unknown number of members. According to InSight Crime, the cartel infrequently commits homicides, and its low-ranking members often do not carry weapons, instead relying on soldiers and police officers for protection. The cartel does not ally itself with any specific drug cartels, instead, offering its services to whatever group is willing to pay. It typically works with drug cartels from Colombia and Mexico.

The Texis Cartel's alleged wide network of connections to Salvadoran government officials helps the group make its drug trafficking operations more efficient. The businessmen and politicians who allegedly lead the cartel grant it the funds necessary to maintain its operations. Soldiers and police officers allegedly involved in the cartel's operations provide security and advise the cartel ahead of time of potential police operations. The cartel allegedly bribes judges and prosecutors to not pursue charges against individuals involved in the cartel's drug trafficking operations.

== See also ==
- Corruption in El Salvador
- Crime in El Salvador
- Illegal drug trade in El Salvador
