= Concepción Quezaltepeque =

- District
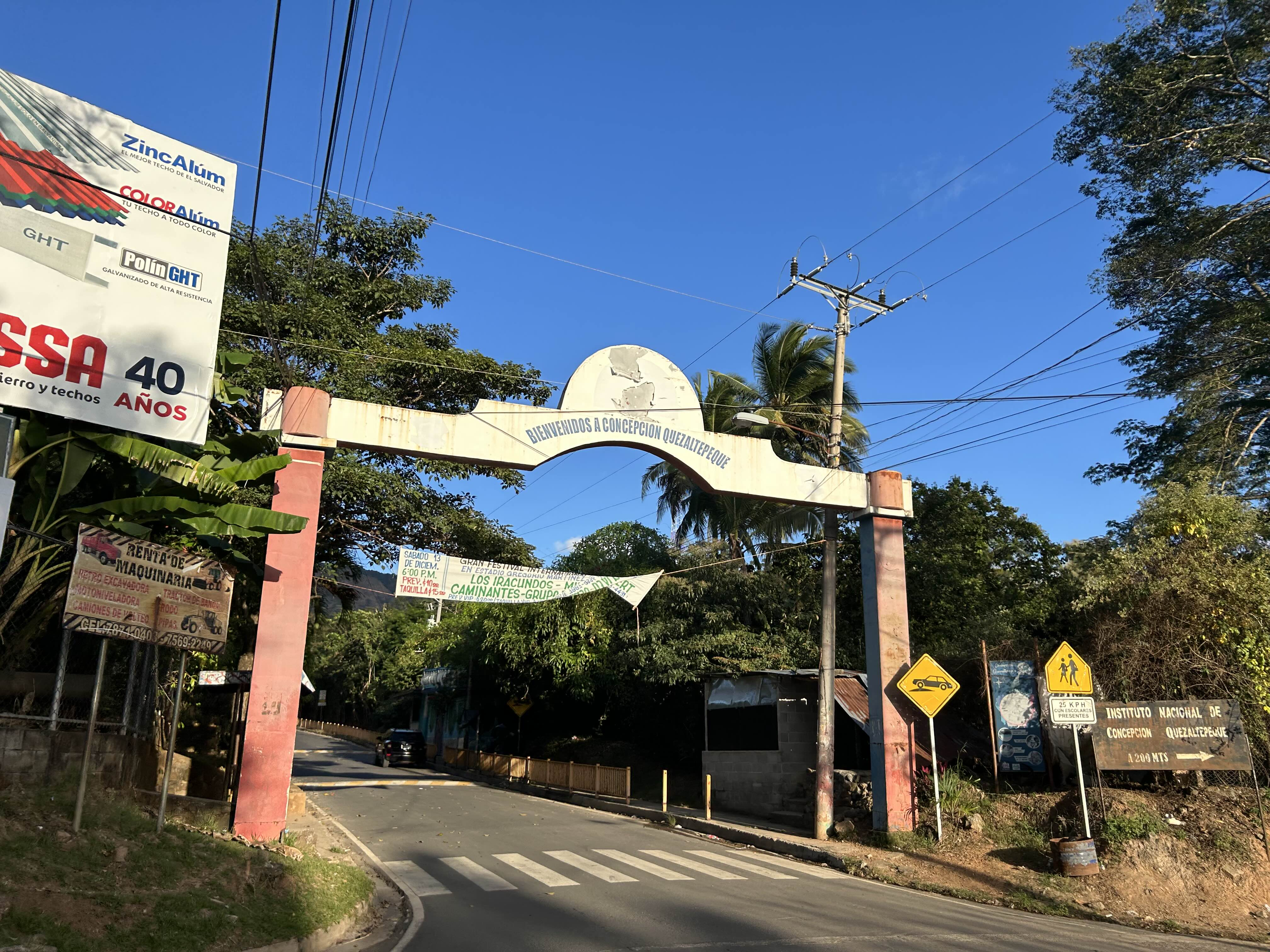

- Location in El Salvador
- Coordinates: 14°5′N 88°57′W
- Country: El Salvador
- Department: Chalatenango
- Municipality: Chalatenango Sur
- Elevation: 1,540 ft (470 m)

Population (2024)
  - District: 6,011
  - Rank: 185th in El Salvador
  - Rural: 6,011

Concepción Quezaltepeque is a district in the Chalatenango Department in the north of El Salvador. It is bordered to the north by Comalapa and La Laguna, to the east by Las Vueltas and Chalatenango, to the south by Chalatenango, and to the west by Santa Rita. The territorial extension of the municipality is 52.54 km^{2}. In 2005 the population was 6,734 inhabitants. The municipality's administration is divided into 6 cantons and 14 caserío.

== History ==
The civilization of El Salvador dates from the Pre-Columbian era, from around 1500 BC, according to experts (Embajada). On May 31, 1522, a Spanish troop, under the leadership of Captain Pedro de Alvarado, disembarked on the Isla Meanguera, located in the Golf of Fonseca (Embajada). In June 1524 Captain Alvarado began a war of conquest against the indigenous people of Cuzcatlán (land of precious things). After 17 days of bloody battles many people died but the Spanish were not defeated, so they continued their conquest (Embajada). During the following centuries the Spanish maintained their control, with European families controlling the land and the native and African slaves (Lonely Planet). Towards the end of 1810 the Priest José Matías Delgado, with the support of many people, began a rebellion (Embajada). After years of struggle, the Central American Independence Act was signed in Guatemala, on September 15, 1821 (Embajada).

By law, on February 18, 1841, Concepción Quezaltepeque and La Junta jointly formed one of the electoral cantons that divided El Salvador. This population belonged to the department of San Salvador from June 12, 1824, until May 22, 1835. From May 22, 1835, until February 14, 1855, it was part of Cuscatlán; and from then on it belonged to Chalatenango. During the administration of General Maximiliano Hernández Martínez, and by legislative decree on July 6, 1938, this village was given the title of "villa". (Fuente: Chalatenango Monografía del departamento y sus municipios. Instituto Geográfico Nacional Ingeniero Pablo Arnoldo Guzmán Centro Nacional de Registro. 1995.)

Due to the repressive practices of the landowners, in 1931 farmers and indigenous citizens began a rebellion. The army responded by killing 30,000 people, including the leader of the rebellion, Farabundo Martí, in a bloody act that was later referred to as La Matanza (The Massacre) (Lonely Planet) But the people remained unhappy with the government. This began a movement organized around leftist guerrillas to combat the repression violence (Stahler-Sholk, 1994:2). The government responded with violence, and the Death Squads were formed, which eventually tortured and killed thousands of people (Foley 2006). More political instability and the assassination of Archbishop Óscar Romero in 1980 sparked the beginning of the Civil War (Lonely Planet). This war, which lasted 12 years, resulted in the death of an estimated 75,000 people and the displacement of thousands more (Stahler-Sholk, 1994:3). The Peace Accords were signed on January 16, 1992 (Embajada).

The department of Chalatenango was heavily impacted by the Civil War. Many people of Concepción Quezaltepeque were forced to abandon their homes because of the violence. But beginning the early 1990s, and especially after the Peace Accords, the people have returned to repopulate the municipality.

== Cantones and their caseríos ==
- El Conacaste: El Conacaste, El Pepeton, Los Cerritos
- El Jocotillo: El Jocotillo, Cazalute
- Llano Grande: Llano Grande, El Cacao, Laja Ancha
- El Rosario: El Rosario
- Monte Redondo: Monte Redondo, La Joya
- Olosingo: Olosingo, La China, Guatezuca

Source: Chalatenango Monografía del departamento y sus municipios. Instituto Geográfico Nacional Ingeniero Pablo Arnoldo Guzmán Centro Nacional de Registro. 1995.

=== History and names of the cantons ===
Some of the inhabitants believe that the Virgin of Concepción can be found in cantón La China encontraron a la Virgin of Concepción, which is why before it was called Concepción. Other versions of the store say that in Pueblo Viejo, in cantón La China, the Virgin didn't want to be there and that every time she was put there she would flee to what is now the church, and when the people arrived they went to find her.

The people of Llano Grande say it is named because it is surrounded by hills (Llano Grande means "Big Plain")

== Politics ==
There are two main political parties in El Salvador, whose roots lie in the Civil War (Foley 2006, Stahler-Sholk 1994). The main right-wing party is La Alianza Republicana Nacionalista (Nationalist Republican Alliance—ARENA), founded on September 30, 1981, and was in power during the last few wars of the Civil War (ARENA 2007). The Frente Farabundo Martí para la Liberación Nacional (Farabundo Martí National Liberation Front—FMLN) the socialist party, is the direct descendant of the guerrilla troops that fought against the Salvadoran government, and was legally constituted as a political party on September 1, 1992 (Stahler-Sholk 1994:3). Since the Civil War the two have remained the country's principal political parties, still divided by the left-right binary. Today ARENA describes itself as a party in whose “forming principles express that a democratic and representational system, which guarantees the freedom of action and the consequences of individual peaceful goals, are the quickest and stablest path to achieve integral development of the nation” (ARENA 2007). The FMLN “has begun to take steps...to act as a consequence of the historically created challenges, in order to make the party an organization of ‘social fighters...’and ‘to unify more’ the struggle for power (Comisión Nacional de Educación Política 2002). Other political parties in El Salvador include the Christian Democratic Party, the United Democratic Center, and the Party of National Conciliation.

The mayor of Concepción Quezaltepeque is Miguel Ángel Funes Mena, of the ARENA party.

== Religion ==
Some 83% of the population of El Salvador identifies as Roman Catholic, and the other 17% identify as 'other' (CIA World Factbook). But in the last few years the population of Catholicism has been reduced (USBDHRL). There is a lot of Protestant activity in the country, and El Salvador has one of the highest rates of Protestantism in Latin America (Soltero y Saravia 2003:1). There is no doubt that religion plays an important role in the lives of many people. Patron-saint and other religious festivals are still very important and celebrated in almost all of the municipalities in the country, and almost all the cantones have their own patron-saint in whose honor the festival is celebrated.

=== Patron-saint and other traditional festivals ===
- Urban center: First week of November, Traditional 'festival of hammocks;' December 7–8, in honor of the Virgen de Concepción; January 19–20, in honor of San Sebastián
- Monte Redondo: June 13, in honor of San Antonio de Padua
- Llano Grande: February 27–28, n honor of Jesús del Rescate.
- Caserío El Pepeton: December 12–13, in honor of Santa Lucia.
- El Jocotillo: February 18, in honor of the Niño de Atoche
- El Conacaste: February 17–18, in honor of La Virgen de los Remedios
- Caserío La China: April 9, in honor of San Expedito.

== Music and dance ==
Formerly popular music included valse and ranchera. The municipality used to have an orchestra and a choir. Marimbas used to be a popular instrument. This music is now no longer heard.

People dancing and wearing masks of older people are part of a traditional dance.

== Agricultural production ==
The crops that are traditionally grown are corn, beans, potatoes, tomatoes, peppers, onions, loroco and rice. These serve for both family sustenance and as saleable items. There used to be a lot of production of indigo, and the production machinery can still be found in Llano Grande, el Pepeto, Monte Redondo and la Peña Cabrera.

Some people also raise animals. In El Conacaste y El Pepeton there are bee hives. Hunting is illegal.

== Citations ==
NOTE: Unless otherwise cited, all information extracted from Martínez Alas et al. "Diagnostico Cultural Municipio de Concepcion Quezaltepeque, 2005." Reprinted with express permission of the Unidad Tecnica Intermunicipal de La Mancomunidad la Montañona, who commissioned the report.

- ARENA. 2007. "Nuestra Historia". Retrieved December 6, 2007.
- CIA World Factbook. November 15, 2007. "El Salvador". Retrieved December 5, 2007.
- Comisión Nacional de Educación Política. 2002. "Historia del FMLN". Retrieved December 6, 2007.
- Embajada de El Salvador en EE. UU. (Embajada), De la Civilización a la Independencia. Retrieved December 4, 2007.
- Foley, Michael W. 2006. "Laying the Groundwork: The Struggle for Civil Society in El Salvador". Journal of Interamerican Studies and World Affairs, 38 (1): 67-104.
- Lonely Planet. "El Salvador Background Information". Retrieved December 3, 2007.
- Martínez Alas, José Salomón, Aguilardo Pérez Yancky, Ismael Ernesto Crespín Rivera, and Deysi Ester Cierra Anaya. 2005. "Diagnostico Cultural Municipio de Concepcion Quezaltepeque, 2005". El Instituo para Rescate Ancestral Indígena (RAIS): El Salvador.
- Stahler-Sholk, Richard. 1994. "El Salvador's Negotiated Transition: From Low-Intensity Conflict to Low-Intensity Democracy". Journal of Interamerican Studies and World Affairs, 36 (4): 1-59.
- US Bureau of Democracy, Human Rights, and Labor (USBHRL). November 8, 2005. "International Religious Freedom Report 2005".
