= Vuelta =

Vuelta, Spanish for "lap" or "roundtrip", is used in the name of a number of cycling races in Spanish speaking countries, as well as a few other contexts:

== Cycling races ==
- Vuelta a España is an annual cycle race in Spain, one of cycling's prestigious Grand Tours, part of the UCI World Tour
- La Vuelta Femenina, a women's edition of the Vuelta a España, part of the UCI Women's World Tour
- Vuelta a Andalucía
- Vuelta a Aragón, Spain
- Vuelta a Asturias, Spain
- Vuelta a Bolivia
- Vuelta a Burgos, Spain
- Vuelta a Cantabria, Spain
- Vuelta a Castilla y León, Spain
- Vuelta a Chihuahua, Mexico
- Vuelta a Colombia
- Vuelta a Colombia Femenina Oro y Paz
- Vuelta a Cuba
- Vuelta a El Salvador
- Vuelta a Extremadura, Spain
- Vuelta a Guatemala
- Vuelta a la Argentina
- Vuelta a La Rioja, Spain
- Vuelta a Mallorca
- Vuelta a Murcia, Spain
- Vuelta a Navarra, Spain
- Vuelta a Paraguay
- Vuelta a Perú
- Vuelta a San Juan, Argentina
- Vuelta a Tenerife, Canary Islands, Spain
- Vuelta a Venezuela
- Vuelta a la Comunitat Valenciana Feminas, Spain
- Vuelta a la Independencia Nacional, Dominican Republic
- Vuelta al Ecuador
- Vuelta al Táchira, Venezuela
- Vuelta Ciclista a Costa Rica
- Vuelta Ciclista a León, Spain
- Vuelta Ciclista Chiapas, Mexico
- Vuelta Ciclista de Chile
- Vuelta del Uruguay
- Vuelta Femenina a Guatemala
- Vuelta Internacional Femenina a Costa Rica
- Vuelta Mexico Telmex
- Vuelta por un Chile Líder, Chile

== Other uses ==
- Vuelta (magazine), literary magazine published in Mexico from 1976 to 1998
- Vuelta (album) (2004), by Richard Shindell
- Vuelta Abajo, a region of Cuba

== See also ==
- Battle of Vuelta de Obligado (1845)
- "Da la Vuelta", 1999 song released by Marc Anthony
- De Vuelta a Casa (1996), album by Eddie Santiago
- De vuelta al barrio (2017–), Peruvian television series
- De Vuelta en la Trampa (1992), album by Lalo Rodríguez
- De Vuelta y Vuelta (2001), album by Jarabe de Palo
- La Vuelta al nido (1938), Argentine film
- La Vuelta de Martín Fierro (1974), Argentine film
- La vuelta de Rocha (1937), Argentine film
- Olvídame y Pega la Vuelta (1982), song by Pimpinela
- Vueltas (disambiguation)
