= Tejutla =

Tejutla may refer to:

- Tejutla, El Salvador
- Tejutla, San Marcos, Guatemala
