= Vueltas =

Vueltas, or Las Vueltas, may refer to some places:

- Vueltas (officially San Antonio de las Vueltas), a village in Villa Clara Province, Cuba
- Las Vueltas, a municipality in Chalatenango Department, El Salvador
- Vueltas (hill), a hill in Parácuaro Municipality, Michoacán, Mexico

== See also ==
- Vuelta (disambiguation)
