= Dulce Nombre de María =

- District
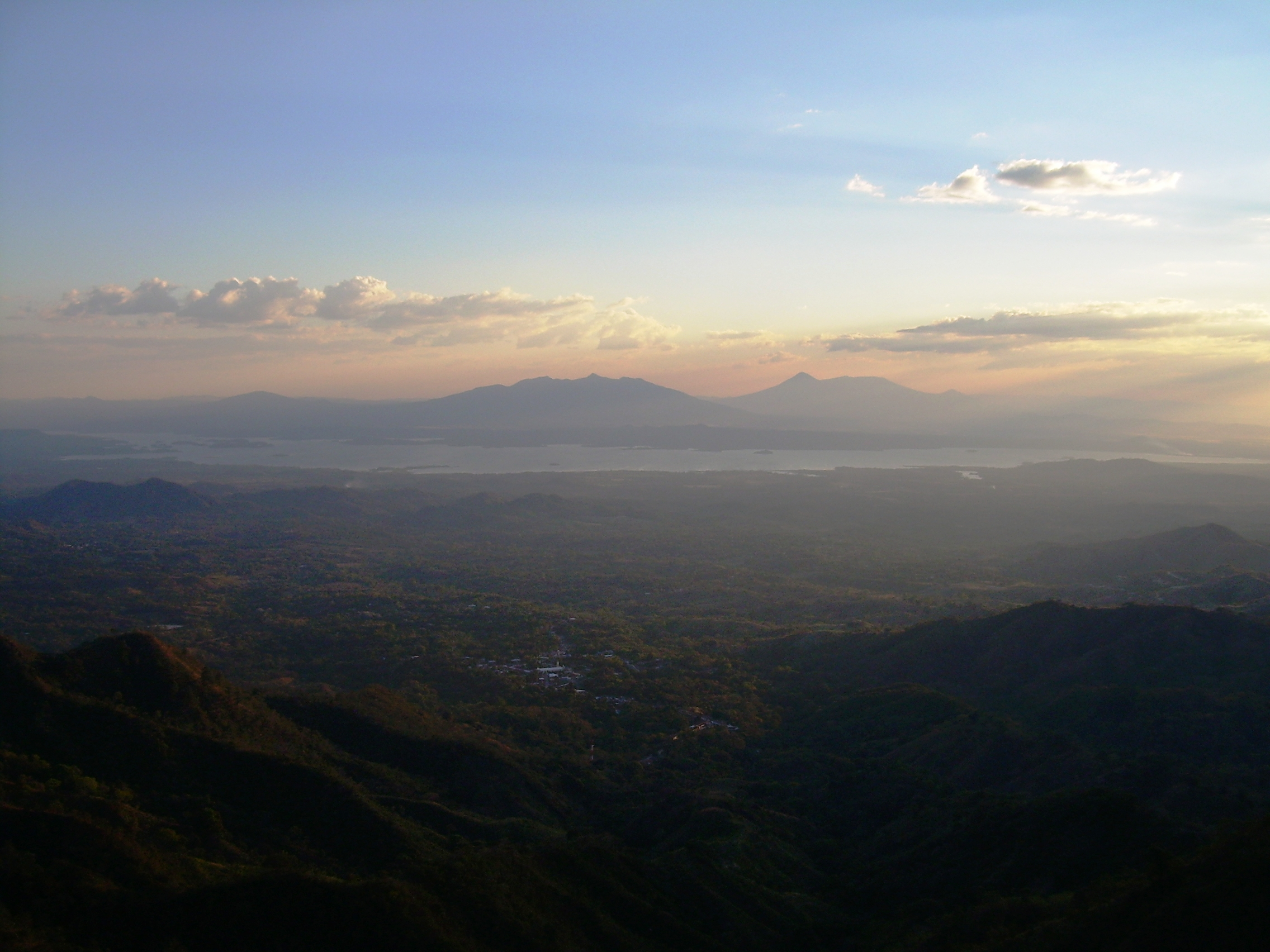

- Location in El Salvador
- Coordinates: 14°9′N 89°1′W
- Country: El Salvador
- Department: Chalatenango
- Municipality: Chalatenango Centro

Area
  - District: 21 sq mi (54 km^{2})
- Elevation: 1,266 ft (386 m)

Population (2024)
  - District: 4,708
  - Rank: 200th in El Salvador
  - Rural: 4,708

Dulce Nombre de María is a district in the Chalatenango Department of El Salvador. It is located 72 kilometers (45 mi) from San Salvador, the capital of El Salvador.

Dulce Nombre de María is bordered by San Fernando to the north, San Rafael and Santa Rita to the south, Comalapa to the east and San Francisco Morazán to the west.

== History ==
Dulce Nombre de María was established in 1790 by several Spanish families who were sent by Baron Carandelet, general captain of Guatemala's Kingdom. It received the title of village on April 21, 1910, and it became an official district of Chalatenango on July 15, 1919.

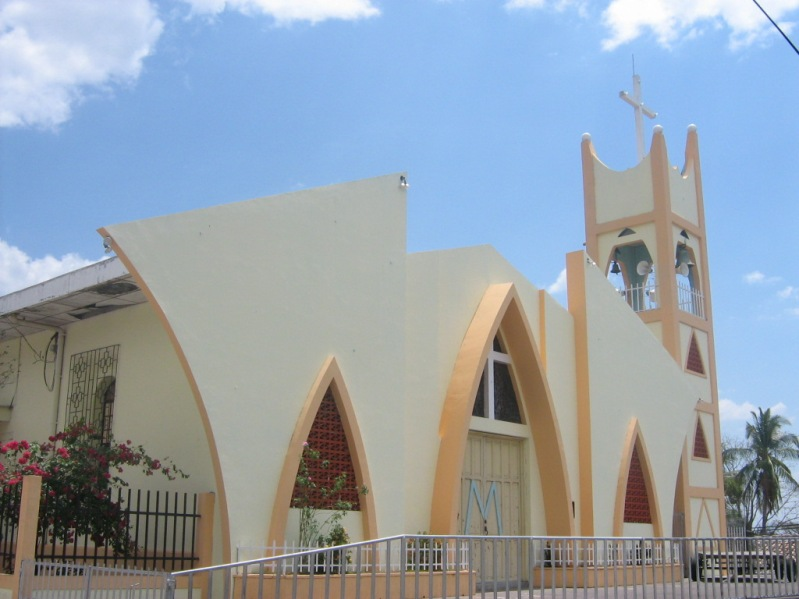
Church of Dulce Nombre de María

In 1980 according to mayor Sr. Antonio Yuloa, the original population was divided in two villages.

The town has a church known as the Iglesia de Dulce Nombre de María. On one bell of Church is written "White NS Dulce Nombre de María, 1827" dedicated to Dulce Nombre de María. It was written when Leon Ventura was priest.

Dulce Nombre de María had belonged to the San Salvador department since June 12, 1824 to May 22, 1835, and to the Cuscatlán department from May 22, 1835 to February 14, 1855, however since February 14, 1855, Dulce Nombre de María has belongs to the Chalatenango department

== Administrative Division ==
Dulce Nombre de María is divided into 10 cantones and 35 caserios including:

- Cuevitas
  - Cuevitas
  - Plan Grande
  - El Cerro Verde
- Chorro Blanco
  - Chorro Blanco
  - El Jocote
  - El Plan
  - El Zángano
  - El Camotal
- El Común
  - El Común
  - El Naranjo
  - Las Alas
- El Ocotal
  - Plan del Ojo de Agua
  - El Chupadero
  - El Plan Chino
  - El Quebracho
  - Cueva del Ermitaño
  - Los Pitos
  - El Manzano
- El Rosario
  - El Rosario
  - La Laguna
- Gutiérrez
  - Gutiérrez
  - La Quinta
  - Cerrito de Piedra
- Los Achiotes
  - Los Achiotes
  - La Cumbre
  - El Terrero
  - Los Gonzáles
- Los Encuentros
  - Los Encuentros
  - El Chupadero
  - El Calero
  - La Mantequilla
  - La Chacra
- Sitio Arriba
  - Sitio Arriba
- Sitio Abajo
  - Sitio Abajo

== Religion ==
In Dulce Nombre de María, there are several religions but the main ones are Catholics and Protestants. However, Catholicism is the most important religion which has more parishioners specially visible on Sundays.

== Division of the city ==
Dulce Nombre de María is divided in five barrios among them:

=== Barrio de la Concepción ===
Located to the south of city, la Concepción is named on behalf of the Virgin of the Immaculate Conception which is celebrated on December 8. Francisco Gavidia School is located here as well.

=== Barrio El Calvario ===
It is located to the west of city, this barrio is dedicated to our lady of Guadalupe, and also in this one is located some Protestant churches like "El Principe de Paz". Moreover this barrio celebrates its holiday on December 7 in each year.

=== Barrio El Carmen ===
It is located to the east of city, this barrio is dedicated to our lady of Carmen, and also in this one is located Instituto Nacional de Dulce Nombre de María. Moreover this barrio celebrates its holiday on December 9 in each year.

=== Barrio El Centro ===
This is located in city's heart, this barrio is dedicated to our lady of Dulce Nombre de María, in addition is dedicated whole city. and also in this one is located Catholic Church. Moreover this barrio celebrates its holiday on December 11 in each year.

=== Barrio San José ===
It is located to the North of city, this barrio is dedicated to San José, maybe this one is the largest of the city because keeps growing to north. Moreover, this barrio celebrates its holiday on December 10 in each year
