= La Laguna, El Salvador =

La Laguna
- District
- Location in El Salvador
- Coordinates: 14°4′N 88°52′W
- Country: El Salvador
- Department: Chalatenango
- Municipality: Chalatenango Sur

Area
  - District: 9.97 sq mi (25.82 km^{2})
- Elevation: 3,369 ft (1,027 m)

Population (2024)
  - District: 3,988
  - Rank: 212th in El Salvador
  - Density: 400.0/sq mi (154.5/km^{2})
  - Rural: 3,988

La Laguna is a district in the Chalatenango Department of El Salvador. The municipality has an area of 25.82 km^{2}.

== Administrative Organization ==
- La Laguna (Urban Center)
- La Cuchilla
- Pacayas
- Los Prados
- Plan Verde
- San José

The urban center is divided into districts:

- Barrio El Centro
- Barrio Las Victorias
- Barrio Los Guevara
- Barrio Las Delicias

== Population ==
The population of the municipality is 5240 inhabitants until 2006. The population density is 202.94 inhabitants per square kilometer.

== History ==
It tells the story that in 1807 the canton Loma Lisa or Santiago belonged to the party of Chalatenango. In 1816 it emerged as the village by the name of La Laguna. From 12 June 1824 to 22 May 1835, belonged to the department of San Salvador and then to the February 14, 1855 the department of Cuscatlán, being annexed after this date by the Chalatenango department since its inception.

On August 14, 1845, the town was burned by Honduran forces. In view of this disaster and the unhealthiness of the place, authorities and neighbors arranged to leave the primitive seat and moved to Old Village site. On July 15, 1919, was annexed to the District of Dulce Nombre de Maria, but only in administrative matters, as in the judiciary remained attached to the Court of First Instance of Tejutla and June 29, 1932, the district of Chalatenango.

During the Armed Conflict, La Laguna was a strategic town during the Salvadoran civil war in the 1980s Their houses, battered by bullets, witnessed and protective of its inhabitants, with its adobe walls 60 centimeters thick. The Montañona, was the aim to overcome the armed forces, as from its heights the whole sector and the movements of war camps was visible. View of houses and mountains, cobbled streets. On Montañona are the tatus where the guerrillas hid and that's where clandestine work Farabundo Martí Radio. With the signing of the peace accords the people reborn to be a tourist place and show its beauty.

A important figure of this town was Don Luciano Calles who was mayor in 1972, and then served as deputy in the Legislative Assembly in 1976. Under his administration the town saw the introduction of the network of sewers, as well as the construction of the Health Unit of the town with the help of FOCCO. Today, after almost two decades of armed conflict end in the country, La Laguna is becoming one of the centres for social and economic development of the northern part of the department. Mayor Baltazar Elias Galdamez has said that La Laguna is a model town at the national level by the various initiatives carried out in the town, focused on social inclusion, and environmental protection.

== Religion ==
83% of the population of El Salvador is identified as Catholic, the other 17% are identified with other religions (CIA World Factbook), but in recent years the popularity of Catholicism has gone down (USBDHRL). There are enough activities of Protestants, and La Laguna is no exception, taking prominence others derived religious currents of Christianity.

Churches present in the municipal:

- Iglesia Católica (Catholic Church)
- Tabernáculo Bíblico Bautista Amigos de Israel (Bible Baptist Tabernacle Friends of Israel)
- Asambleas de Dios (Assemblies of God)
- Iglesia Apostólica de la Fe en Cristo (Apostolic Church of Faith in Christ)
- Iglesia Pentecostal Unida (United Pentecostal Church)

== Agricultural production ==
Agricultural production has historically been the municipality is of beans, maize and sorghum, but due to the crisis in the agricultural sector, many people became livestock or emigrated to the United States. Therefore, the population and not strongly identify with an ancestral production. Usually what occurs is for family support and those marketed under the produced, they do through intermediaries or directly.

Today the town has revived important agricultural crops such as livestock, planting of fruit, vegetables and coffee production with the help of new technologies. Beekeeping and fish farming are also maintained.

== Food and beverages ==
The traditional food includes beans, tortillas, meat of domestic animals, soups, sweets, and seeds. Other traditional dishes include:

- Pisque's famous tamales. Acts masa is cooked with ash, is a yellow corn, tamales wrapped in leaves are cooked vegetable. The main ingredients are: salt, egg, beans whole new color to fire in the tamale.
- Tenquiques, these are edible fungi that usually pass through trees Guachipilin.
- The totopostes is also a food that is made on site, they are made with lard and salt mass. They can be cooked on the griddle like tortillas or furnaces with the advantage that they can last up to a month and not get ruined. They are also called travelers because they usually did when people traveled for some time out of their land, mainly to pick coffee or Honduras to do business.
- Chaparro (liquor). It is prepared with water, sweet brown sugar, pineapple, ginger, nances, cinnamon and other fruits that are put to ferment and then cooked by hand until a nice brandy strong smell and taste.
- Pork envinagrado. It is prepared with onion, pepper, salt, annatto, tomato, onion, Oreganito, three to four days left in vinegar and can be eaten cooked or fried.
- Pupusas peasant or Cupas. These become bent like empanadas.
- Chipilin pupusas, lorocos, white sheet (quilite).

Most of the ingredients used for traditional meals and drinks these are natural and can be found or produced in the area. Also part of biodiversity, which in some cases is threatened or endangered. However, this is being lost, now people eat more industrial products with many chemicals that affect the health of the population.

== Tourist sites ==
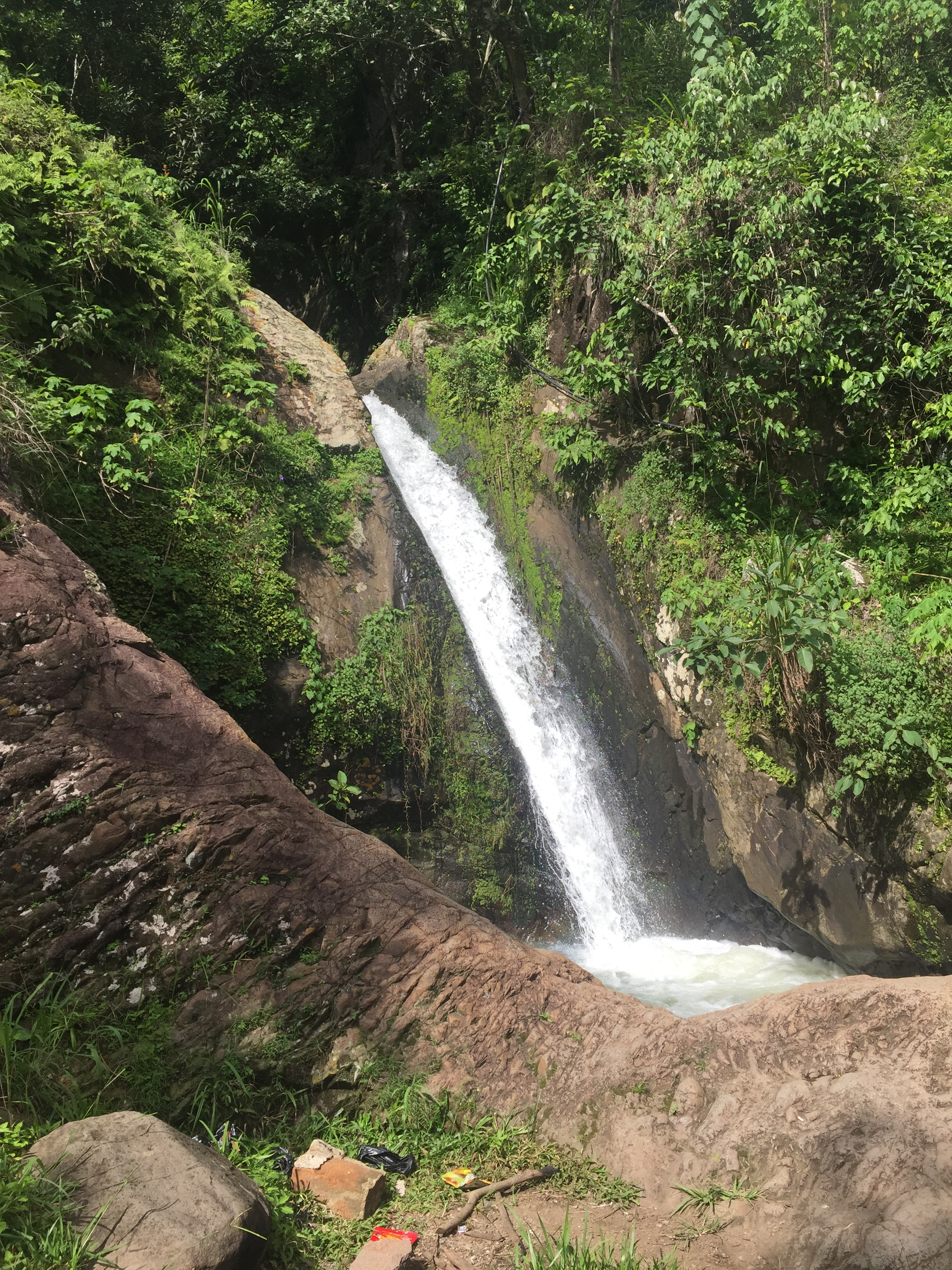
The waterfall of Las Pacayas.

Tourist sites are located in La Laguna and the neighboring villages of El Cerrito, La Montañona, and Las Pacayas.

Sites:

- La Montañona, a forested massif where oak and pine predominate, serves as a historic and national park.
- A stream and freshwater waterfall located in Las Pacayas.
- The Sumpul River north of La Laguna which serves as a Honduran–Salvadoran border.
- El Cerrito de la Virgen de Fatima.
- The Honda creek that has a famous pond called El Cajon or blade in Canton La Cuchilla.
- A resort in El Cerrito near the Cerrón Grande Reservoir.
- The Central Park of La Laguna.
- La Casona de La Montañona.
- Piedra del Cristo in La Cuchilla is a ravine about 150m deep where, according to local tradition and legend, El Cipitío appears. The remains of a plane downed in the Salvadoran Civil War is located at the site and one of its wings serves as a bridge over the ravine.

== Craft production ==
The municipality is characterized by the production of rigging, flowers and toys and whistles, tops coyotes (nose) and kites. It is noteworthy that these crafts are no longer seen in the town, however, still there are people who can develop them but having no value and demand, not compiled. There are also people who make coconut candy, sugar, dried fruit and guava.

Also in the months of January to March are popular grinding mills or where sugar cane is processed and obtained at the various stages of cooking products like cachaça, clear, table honey, marshmallows, smoothies and sweet brown sugar, lacking cooked in honey pumpkins.

== Other information ==
- IMM: 36.49
- Total households: 933
- Average schooling: 3.08
- Monthly household income ($): 174.65
- Households in extreme poverty (%): 47.13
- Total households with remittances: 295

== Municipal Services ==
=== Educational Sector ===
- Education until Bachelor of the Urban Center
- Two cantons education to 9th
- Two cantons education up to 6th
- One canton education to 3rd

=== Health Sector ===
- Health Unit in the Urban Center
- All cantons are attended by health promoters.
- Service waste collection, sorting and composting of organic waste is given.
- The wastewater is collected and through the treatment plant sewage disposal is performed.

=== Water Sector ===
- Almost fully stocked water. One canton and one hamlet lack of drinking water
- Water quality is poor. Introduction of drinking water in 2 cantons of the municipality.

=== Electricity Sector ===
- Almost fully electrified. One canton has no electricity
