= Illegal drug trade in El Salvador =

Illegal drug trade in El Salvador has included, according to some sources, trans-shipping of cocaine by the Nicaraguan Contras.

== CIA and Contras cocaine trafficking in the US ==
Former DEA agent Celerino Castillo alleged that during the 1980s Ilopango Airport in El Salvador was used by Nicaraguan Contras for drug smuggling flights with the knowledge and complicity of the CIA. These allegations were part of an investigation by the United States Department of Justice Office of the Inspector General. Castillo also testified before the House Permanent Select Committee on Intelligence. Between 1996 and 1998 the Central Intelligence Agency investigated and then published a report about its alleged involvement in cocaine sales in the US. This was prompted by the journalist Gary Webb's report in the San Jose Mercury News alleging that the CIA was behind the 1980s crack epidemic.

== Sex trafficking ==
El Salvador is one of the biggest sources for human trafficking. Most victims are females who are sold mainly for sex and children for forced labor. Trafficking offenders use fraudulent documentation to facilitate the movement of foreign victims. Salvadorans have been subjected to forced prostitution in Guatemala, Mexico, Belize, the United States, Spain, and Italy.

== See also ==
- Crime in El Salvador
- Texis Cartel
