= Eddie Santiago (album) =

Studio album by Eddie Santiago
- Released: February 21, 1995
- Genre: Salsa
- Length: 50:49
- Label: EMI/Capitol Records
- Producer: Tommy Villarini

Eddie Santiago chronology
Cada Vez, Otra Vez (1993)	Eddie Santiago (1995)	De Vuelta a Casa (1996)

Eddie Santiago is an album by Puerto Rican salsa singer Eddie Santiago, released on February 21, 1995. Eddie's comeback album, includes top hits Necesito and Te Amo; his last album under EMI/Capitol Records label.

== Track listing ==
This information adapted from CD Universe.

No.	Title	Length
1.	"Necesito"
2.	"Si Faltas Me Matas"
3.	"Te Amo"
4.	"Nena"
5.	"Que Puedo Hacer Yo"
6.	"Sin Ti"
7.	"Cuidado"
8.	"No Se Que Esta Pasando"
9.	"Voy a Desahogarme a Solas"
10.	"Parece Que Fue Ayer"

== Credits ==
=== Musicians ===
- Jimmy Morales - congas
- Ángel "Cachete" Maldonado - percussion
- José Luis Dávila
- Pedro Pérez - bass
- Celso Clemente - bongos
- Antonio "Tonito" Vázquez
- Chago Martínez - timbales
- Danny Fuentes - trombone
- Domingo García - piano
- Eddie Santiago - vocals
- Héctor "Pichi" Pérez - percussion, background vocals
- Jesús "Rafi" Torres
- José Luis Dávila - background vocals
- and also Nino Segarra

=== Production ===
- Audio Mixers: Papo Sánchez; Tommy Villarini.
- Arrangers: Domingo García; Ernesto Sánchez; Tommy Villarini
- Photographer: Rafi Claudio
- Engineers: Jesús "Papo" Sánchez, José Luis Estrada
- Recording Studio: Telesound Studio, San Juan, Puerto Rico
