= Ojos de Agua, El Salvador =

Ojos de Agua
- District
- Location in El Salvador
- Coordinates: 14°10′51″N 88°53′32″W
- Country: El Salvador
- Department: Chalatenango
- Municipality: Chalatenango Sur

Population (2024)
  - District: 3,023
  - Rank: 231st in El Salvador
  - Rural: 3,023

Ojos de Agua is a district in the Chalatenango Department of El Salvador. It is about 1700 feet (or about 1.1 kilometers) from the border of Honduras and El Salvador, which is formed by the Rio Sumpul.

The name "Ojos de Agua" translates from Spanish to "Water Eyes."
