= De Vuelta a Casa =

Studio album by Eddie Santiago
- Released: 1996
- Genre: Salsa
- Label: Rodven Records

Eddie Santiago chronology
Eddie Santiago (1995)	De Vuelta a Casa (1996)	Enamorado (1997)

Professional ratings
Review scores
Source	Rating
Allmusic	3/5 stars

De Vuelta a Casa (Back to home) is a studio album recorded by Puerto Rican singer Eddie Santiago, returning to Rodven label in 1996.

== Track listing ==
This information adapted from Allmusic.

No.	Title	Length
1.	"Y Ya No Aguanto Más"
2.	"Aquí Estoy"
3.	"Quiero Saber"
4.	"Me Vuelve Loco Tu Amor"
5.	"Noche No Te Vayas"
6.	"Un Si del Alma"
7.	"De Qué Sexo es el Amor"
8.	"Amor de Fantasía"
9.	"De Vuelta a Casa"

== Credits ==
=== Musicians ===
- Eddie Santiago (vocals)
- Nino Segarra (vocals background)
- Celso Clemente (bongos)
- Danny Fuentes; Gamalier González; Raffi Torres (trombone)
- Domingo Garcia (piano)
- Efraín Hernández (bass)
- Jimmy Morales (congas)
- Santiago "Chago" Martínez (timbals)
- Hector Perez (percussion, vocals)

=== Production ===
- Authors: Luis Angel; Pedro Azael;
- Composer: Sady Ramírez; Aida Rivera; Eddie Santiago
- Director: Tommy Villarini; Louis García; Ernesto Sanchez
- Engineers: Juan "Pericles" Covas; Vinny Urrutia
- Clothing/Wardrobe, Make-Up: Angel Medina
- Photographer: Jorge Velazquez
- Recording Studio:
