= Las Vueltas =

- District
- Location in El Salvador
- Coordinates: 14°05′37″N 88°53′22″W
- Country: El Salvador
- Department: Chalatenango
- Municipality: Chalatenango Sur
- Founded: 1765

Government
  - Mayor: Rosa Cándida Alas de Menjívar (FMLN)

Area
  - District: 14.22 sq mi (36.83 km^{2})

Population (2024)
  - District: 1,609
  - Rank: 254th in El Salvador
  - Rural: 1,609

Las Vueltas is a district in the Chalatenango Department in the north of El Salvador. The municipality is bordered to the north by Ojos de Agua, to the east by Las Flores, to the south by Chalatenango, and to the northeast by Concepción Quezaltepeque. The territory covers 36.83 km^{2} and the population was, as of 2005, of 2,101 inhabitants. For its administration, the municipality is divided into six cantones and 35 caseríos.

== History ==
According to the information preserved by tradition, Las Vueltas was founded in 1765 by emigrants from Chalatenango. By legislative decree on May 12, 1902, the then municipality of La Ceiba was abolished and changed into a cantón in the municipality of Las Vueltas.

A new law, that of April 23, 1906, reinstated El Zapotal as part of Las Vuelas and also moved the prosperous cantones of La Ceiba and La Laguna to Chalatenango. Another legislative decree, on April 8, 1943, moved these two cantones out of the jurisdiction of Chalatenango and also shifted the cantones of El Zapotal and El Coyolar to Ojos de Agua.

Due to the repression of the landowners, in 1931 farmers and indigenous citizens began a rebellion (Lonely Planet). The army responded by killing 30,000 people, including the leader of the rebellion, Farabundo Martí, in a bloody act that was later referred to as La Matanza (The Massacre) (Lonely Planet). But the people remained unhappy with the government. This began a movement organized around leftist guerrillas to combat the repression violence (Stahler-Sholk, 1994:2). The government responded with violence, and the Death Squads were formed, which eventually torturing and killed thousands of people (Foley 2006). More political instability and the assassination of Archbishop Oscar Romero in 1980 sparked the beginning of the Civil War (Lonely Planet). This war, which lasted 12 years, resulted in the death of an estimated 75,000 people and the displacement of thousands more (Stahler-Sholk, 1994:3). The Peace Accords were signed on January 16, 1992 (Embajada).

The department of Chalatenango was heavily impacted by the Civil War. Many people of Las Vueltas were forced to abandon their homes because of the violence. But beginning in the early 1990s, and especially after the Peace Accords, the people have returned to repopulate the municipality.

== Geography ==
=== Cantones and their caseríos ===
- Conacaste: Conacaste, El Arrozalito, La Hondurita, Chilguaste, El Zurron, Los Jobos
- El Sicahuite: El Sicahuite, El Cacao, El Potrero, Tierra Blanca, El Tablón
- La Ceiba: La Ceiba, El Caulote, Los Menjivar, El Limón
- La Laguna Seca: La Laguna, El Picacho, Vallecito, La Quebrada, El Chorizo, Sitio El Amate, Sitio El Copinol
- Los Naranjos: Los Naranjos, San Antonio, Plan del Barro, Los Amates
- San José: San José, El Cordoncillo, El Balcon, Tierra Blanca, San José El Amatillo, La Ceibita, El Descanso, El Portillo, El Roblar

== Culture ==
=== Religion ===
Patron-saint and other religious festivals are still very important and celebrated in Las Vueltas, as in almost all of the municipalities in the country. Almost all the cantons have their own patron-saint in whose honor the festival is celebrated. The fiestas patronales in the municipalities are the following:

- Urban center:
  - February 10–12, in honor of the Virgin de Concepción
  - October 10–13, anniversary of the repopulation of the municipality
- Canton of Conacaste:
  - December 18, in honor of the Virgin de los Remedios
- Canton of Los Naranjos:
  - July 15–16, in honor of Virgin del Carmen
- Canton of El Sicahuite:
  - June 20–21, in honor of San Luís Gonzaga
  - May 13, in honor of the Virgin de Lourdes
- Cantón San José:
  - March 19, in honor of San José de la Montaña (in the Caserío El Amatillo)
- Cantón La Ceiba:
  - June 13, in honor of San Antonio de Padua

=== Music ===
Before the popular music was ranchera and vals. Some of the popular instruments used to be guitars, violins, accordions, and marimbas. This music is now no longer heard.

== Main sights ==
=== Tourist sites ===
- Sumpul River, where it enters in Cantón El Conacaste
- El Volcán / El Conacaste and la Bola are known as "the boiler" because there is natural hot water.
- Above Tamulasco River there are various natural pools: La Sirena, etc.

=== Archaeological sites ===
- In Sicahuite there is stone art (petroglyphs) and archaeological material.
- In Plan de Barro there is stone art.
- In Las Vueltas and El Conacaste, there is stone art.
- In Los Naranjos there is stone art.

The petroglyphs run in some sort of "line", perhaps from north to south passing through El Zapotal, El Tablon and on up to San Juan Olosingo at the border of Honduras. They are largely Lenca drawings.

== Agricultural production ==
The people of Las Vueltas grow corn, beans, and sorghum. The majority, if it is a good crop, is for family sustenance; little is sold. The fields also produce melons, cucumbers, and squash.

=== Food and dinks ===
Traditional foods include beans, tortillas, metas, soups, sweets, and seeds. Other traditional foods and dishes include:

- A variety of pupusas (stuffed corn tortillas)
- Tamales
- Coffee of corn of sorghum
- Soups made with local vegetables
- Sweetened ayote, a local squash
- Atole of fruits
- Natural fruit juices of local fruits, such as nance

The majority of the ingredients used to make these foods and drinks are natural and are grown in the area. They also form part of the biodiversity that, in some cases, is threatened or in danger of extinction. Nevertheless, these habits are less common as more people eat commercially produced foods.

== Twin towns ==
- Windsor (Ontario, Canada)

== References and citations ==
=== Citations ===
- ARENA. 2007. "Nuestra Historia." [Online] https://web.archive.org/web/20040320053204/http://www.arena.com.sv/. Retrieved December 6, 2007.
- CIA World Factbook. November 15, 2007. "El Salvador." [Online]. . Retrieved December 5, 2007.
- Comisión Nacional de Educación Política. 2002. "Historia del FMLN." [Online] https://web.archive.org/web/20071207092942/http://fmln.org.sv/portal/index.php?module=htmlpages&func=display&pid=1. Retrieved December 6, 2007.
- Embajada de El Salvador en EE. UU. (Embajada), De la Civilización a la Independencia. [Online]. https://web.archive.org/web/20080120012009/http://www.elsalvador.org/home.nsf. Retrieved December 4, 2007.
- Foley, Michael W. 2006. Laying the Groundwork: The Struggle for Civil Society in El Salvador. Journal of Interamerican Studies and World Affairs. 38 (1): 67-104.
- Lonely Planet. "El Salvador Background Information." [Online]. https://web.archive.org/web/20071008200023/http://www.lonelyplanet.com/worldguide/destinations/central-america/el-salvador/essential?a=culture. Retrieved December 3, 2007.
- Martínez Alas, José Salomón, Aguilardo Pérez Yancky, Ismael Ernesto Crespín Rivera, and Deysi Ester Cierra Anaya. 2005. "Diagnostico Cultural Municipio de Las Vueltas, 2005." El Instituo para Rescate Ancestral Indígena (RAIS): El Salvador.
- Stahler-Sholk, Richard. 1994. El Salvador's Negotiated Transition: From Low-Intensity Conflict to Low-IntensityDemocracy. Journal of Interamerican Studies and World Affairs. 36 (4): 1-59.
- US Bureau of Democracy, Human Rights, and Labor (USBHRL). November 8, 2005. "International Religious Freedom Report 2005."
