= San Francisco Morazán =

- District
- Location in El Salvador
- Coordinates: 14°11′N 89°3′W
- Country: El Salvador
- Department: Chalatenango
- Municipality: Chalatenango Centro
- Elevation: 1,923 ft (586 m)

Population (2024)
  - District: 3,036
  - Rank: 230th in El Salvador
  - Rural: 3,036

San Francisco Morazán is a district in the Chalatenango Department of El Salvador.
