= Sumpul River massacre =

1980 massacre in El Salvador

- Part of the Salvadoran Civil War
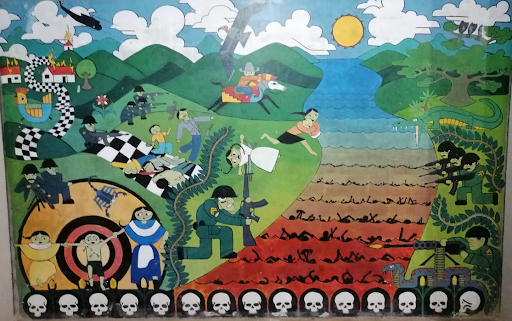
- Mural depicting the Sumpul River massacre
- Location: 14°07′30″N 88°50′24″W; Sumpul River near Las Aradas, Chalatenango, El Salvador
- Date: May 14, 1980
- Target: Salvadoran refugees
- Attack type: Shooting, mass murder
- Deaths: 300–600
- Perpetrators: El Salvador: Military Detachment No. 1; National Guard; ORDEN; Honduras: 12th Battalion

Between 300 and 600 Salvadoran refugees were massacred while trying to cross the Sumpul River in Chalatenango, El Salvador, on May 13, 1980 during the Salvadoran Civil War. Salvadoran Armed Forces and pro-government paramilitaries launched an offensive to disrupt the activities of the Farabundo Martí National Liberation Front (FMLN). The offensive created many refugees, who were attacked by the Salvadoran forces. The Honduran military prevented them from fleeing into Honduras. Both El Salvador and Honduras denied responsibility for the incident. In 1993, the United Nations Truth Commission described the incident as a serious violation of international law.

== Prelude ==
Following the 1969 Football War between El Salvador and Honduras, the Organization of American States (OAS) negotiated a ceasefire that established an OAS-monitored demilitarized zone (DMZ) three kilometers wide on each side of the border. When the Salvadoran Civil War began, many villages, including the hamlet Las Aradas, were abandoned and camps were formed within the DMZ on the Honduran side of the border to avoid harassment from the military, as well as the National Guard and paramilitary Organización Democrática Nacionalista (ORDEN), which did not cross the border.

The Honduran government became concerned with Salvadoran refugees residing in Honduras, one of the causes of the Football War. The Salvadoran government believed these camps were being used by FMLN guerrillas, partly based on the membership of many peasants within the DMZ in the Federación de Trabajadores del Campo, a political organization promoting agrarian reform and seen by the Salvadoran government as supporting the guerillas. In early 1980, FMLN guerrillas organized several small Salvadoran border villages and provided rudimentary military training. In early May, they began farming nearby fallow land.

In the last two weeks of March 1980, the Honduran government pressured refugees to return to El Salvador; a group returned to Las Aradas. Following their return, twice National Guard and ORDEN troops advanced on Las Aradas, and twice the refugees fled across the river. On May 5, Honduran and Salvadoran military leaders met on the border to discuss how to prevent Salvadoran guerillas from entering Honduras. A few days later, the Honduran government pressured refugees to return to Las Aradas, and some did.

On May 13, Salvadoran forces consisting of Military Detachment No. 1, the National Guard and ORDEN commenced an anti-guerilla operation. From several points, including the nearby village of Las Vueltas, they converged on Las Aradas, clashing with guerillas many times. Also on May 13, 150 Honduran soldiers belonging to the 12th Battalion, based in Santa Rosa de Copán, arrived in Santa Lucía, Honduras, and San José, Honduras, near the Sumpul River and prevented the refugees from crossing the border.

== Massacre ==
On May 14, 1980, Salvadoran soldiers ordered the refugees to return from Sumpul River. They threatened to throw children into the river. The refugees did not return. At 10:00 am, the soldiers fired "fistfuls" of bullets penetrating walls and killing many people and cattle. They gathered and killed many refugees, shooting them with machine guns, bludgeoning them with rifle butts or goring them with machetes and military knives. ORDEN members threw babies and young children into the air and cleaved or decapitated them with machetes.

The refugees attempted to cross the Sumpul river into Honduras, but Honduran soldiers prevented them, possibly by shooting. (Note: A Washington Post article shortly after the massacre stated that the nature of Honduran involvement was unclear and that they might have shot at refugees as they attempted to cross the river. A year later, the United Press International stated that Honduran soldiers shot refugees. The 1993 UN Truth Commission Report and most recent sources state only that Honduran soldiers had prevented refugees from crossing the river.) Salvadoran soldiers shot many refugees attempting to cross the river, while many others, especially children, drowned. Helicopters strafed the refugees hiding along stone fences.

The massacre lasted six to nine hours, leaving at least 300 dead. Many sources place the death toll at 600. (Note: One of the first publications to report a death toll for the massacre was The New York Times, which reported 600 deaths. The 1993 UN Truth Commission report states that the death toll was "at least 300". Most sources follow the lead of either The Times or the report; exceptions include Public Radio International, which has placed the death toll between 600 and 700.)

== Aftermath ==
Villages abandoned by the refugees during the attack remained deserted. The National Guard prevented refugees from returning; the Salvadoran and Honduran armies both departed the next day.

The massacre received widespread media attention in Honduras. On May 21, the Costa Rican morning news program Radio Noticias del Continente transmitted the first news report. Salvadoran priests and rescue workers attempting to visit the site of the massacre a few days later were turned away, but a Honduran priest reported that "there were so many vultures picking at the bodies in the water that it looked like a black carpet." Two foreign journalists visited the site from Honduras and conducted interviews of survivors, publishing their findings in a leaflet. A few days after the massacre, the newspaper Tiempo published an interview with Father Roberto Yalaga, a priest in the diocese of Santa Rosa de Copán, who confirmed that at least 325 Salvadorians had been killed and that a Honduran military detachment had cordoned off the bank of the Sumpul river.

Cases of typhoid in other villages along the river appeared within a week and were attributed to the large quantity of decomposing corpses in the river. The bodies were not buried, and piles of bones from the massacre could still be seen a year later.

On June 19, the diocese of Santa Rosa de Copán filed a formal complaint, signed by its 38 pastoral workers. The complaint accused the government and armed forces of Honduras of complicity in the massacre and in the subsequent cover-up. It also accused the OAS of complicity in the cover-up. The Archdiocese of San Salvador endorsed and associated itself with the complaint by the diocese of Santa Rosa de Copán in a communiqué published on June 29, and the Honduran Conference of Bishops, headed by the Archbishop of Tegucigalpa, Monsignor Héctor E. Santos, endorsed the accusations in a July 1 press release.

Salvadoran Defense Minister José Guillermo García denied the massacre, stating, "There have been dead in that area, but not in such 'industrial' quantities." The U.S. embassy in Tegucigalpa also denied the massacre. In an official statement, Honduras described the accusations as libelous and irresponsible. Honduran President Policarpo Paz denied the claims in a nationally broadcast radio speech. Honduran Minister of Government Cristóbal Díaz García told the press that no one doubted that a massacre had occurred, but claimed that the Honduran military had not been involved and that government would not set up a commission to investigate. Alfonso Rodríguez Rincón, Chief of the OAS observers, dismissed the accusation by the Honduran Church as the product of an overactive imagination, stating that the OAS knew nothing about the incident. He noted that there were numerous operations on the Salvadorian side and it was conceivable that many guerrillas had been killed, speculating that the incident was being confused with another one.

In October 1980, President José Napoleón Duarte, in an interview with United Church Observer, acknowledged that a military operation had taken place in the Sumpul river area and said that some 300 people, all of them "communist guerrillas", had died. The UN Truth Commission later determined OAS observers reported a major clash between Salvadoran forces and the FMLN took place May 14–16, resulting in 200 deaths that included civilians, but the report included no evidence of a massacre.

The U.S. embassy eventually said "something happened." A Salvadoran official visiting Washington, D.C., in April 1981 said 135 people had died but disputed most other details of the incident. A year after the massacre, García said a number of people had died in a clash on May 14, 1980, at the Sumpul river, but the number had been greatly exaggerated.

On October 26, 1992, survivors of the Sumpul river massacre filed a judicial complaint with the Chalatenango Court of First Instance, which was admitted under the title "on verifying the murder of 600 people".

On April 1, 1993, the United Nations published its "Report of the UN Truth Commission on El Salvador", finding that there was "substantial evidence" that Salvadoran forces "massacred no less than 300 unarmed civilians" and that "the massacre was made possible by the cooperation of the Honduran armed forces." It noted that "Salvadorian military authorities were guilty of a cover-up of the incident", and described the massacre as "a serious violation of international humanitarian law and international human rights law".

On May 14, 2012, the 32nd anniversary of the massacre, the Salvadoran Ministry of Culture declared Las Aradas "Protected Cultural Property".

In July 2016, when the Salvadoran Supreme Court struck down an amnesty law protecting participants in the civil war, enabling their prosecution, the case regarding the massacre remained open.
