= El Paraíso, El Salvador =

El Paraíso, Chalatenango
- District
- Nickname: Villa del paraiso
- Location in El Salvador
- Coordinates: 14°5′N 89°5′W
- Country: El Salvador
- Department: Chalatenango
- Municipality: Chalatenango Centro
- Established: 1786

Government

Area
  - Water: 12 km^{2} (4.6 sq mi)
  - Urban: 3 km^{2} (1.2 sq mi)
  - Metro: 1 km^{2} (0.39 sq mi)
- Elevation: 260 m (850 ft)

Population (2024)
  - District: 11,622
  - Rank: 119th in El Salvador
  - Urban: 6,214
  - Rural: 5,408
- Time zone: UTC-6 (CST)
  - Summer (DST): UTC-5 (CDT)
- Sv: 00989
- Area code: 78

El Paraíso is a district in the Chalatenango Department of El Salvador. Settlements of El Paraíso include Calle Nueva, Coyotera, El Arenal, El Desvío, El Tamarindo, La Angostura, and Santa Bárbara. El Paraíso has two rivers: El Río Grande, and El Río de la Arenal.
