= Sumpul River =

River in El Salvador

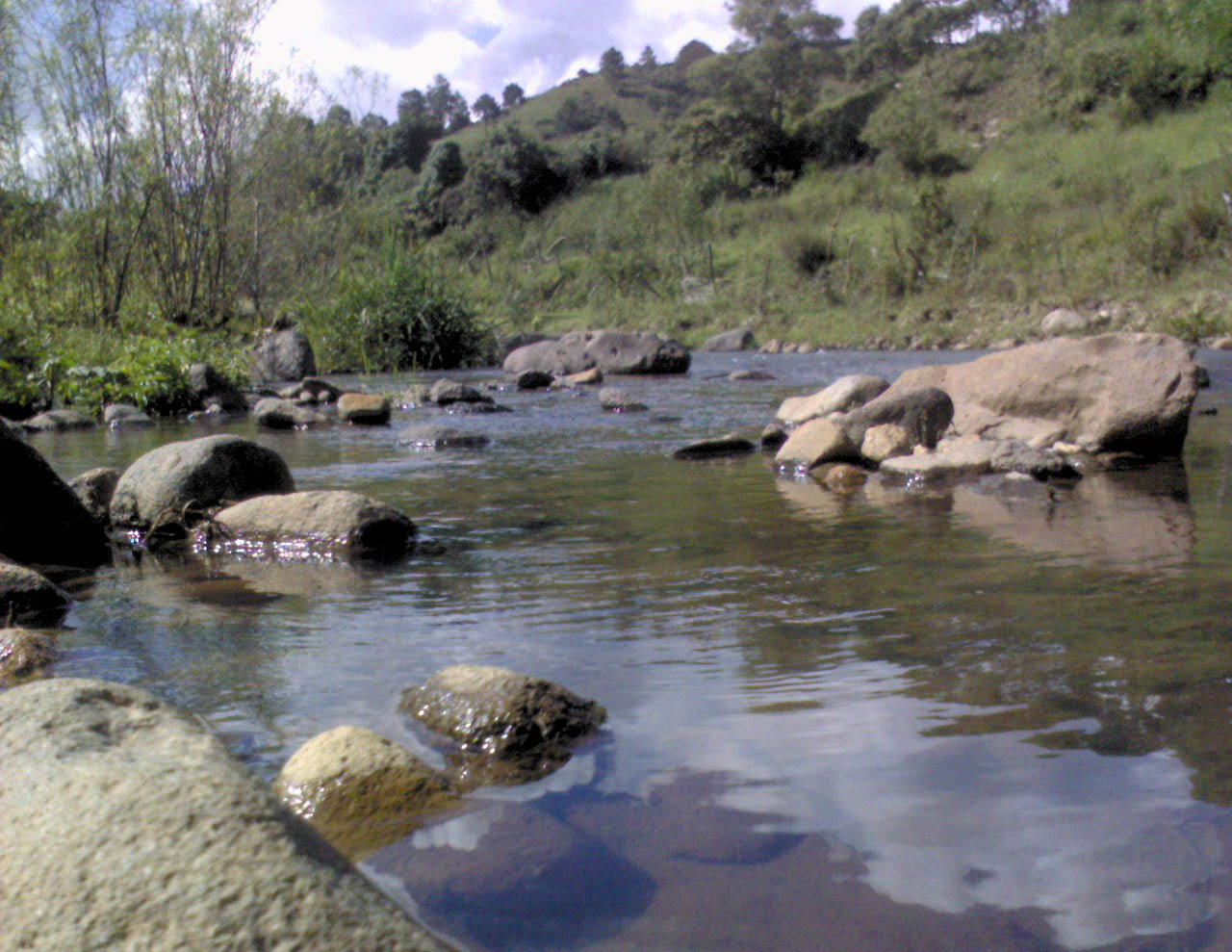
- Río Sumpul near Las Pilas, Chalatenango

- Location of mouth

Location
- Country: El Salvador, Honduras

Physical characteristics
- Mouth
  - coordinates: 13°59′28″N 88°46′10″W

The Sumpul River (Spanish: río Sumpul) is a river in north-western El Salvador on the border with Honduras. It flows through the Chalatenango Department.

On 14 May 1980, the river and the nearby village of Las Aradas were the site of a massacre by the Salvadoran Armed Forces that left between 300 and 600 people dead.
