= Comalapa, El Salvador =

Comalapa
- District
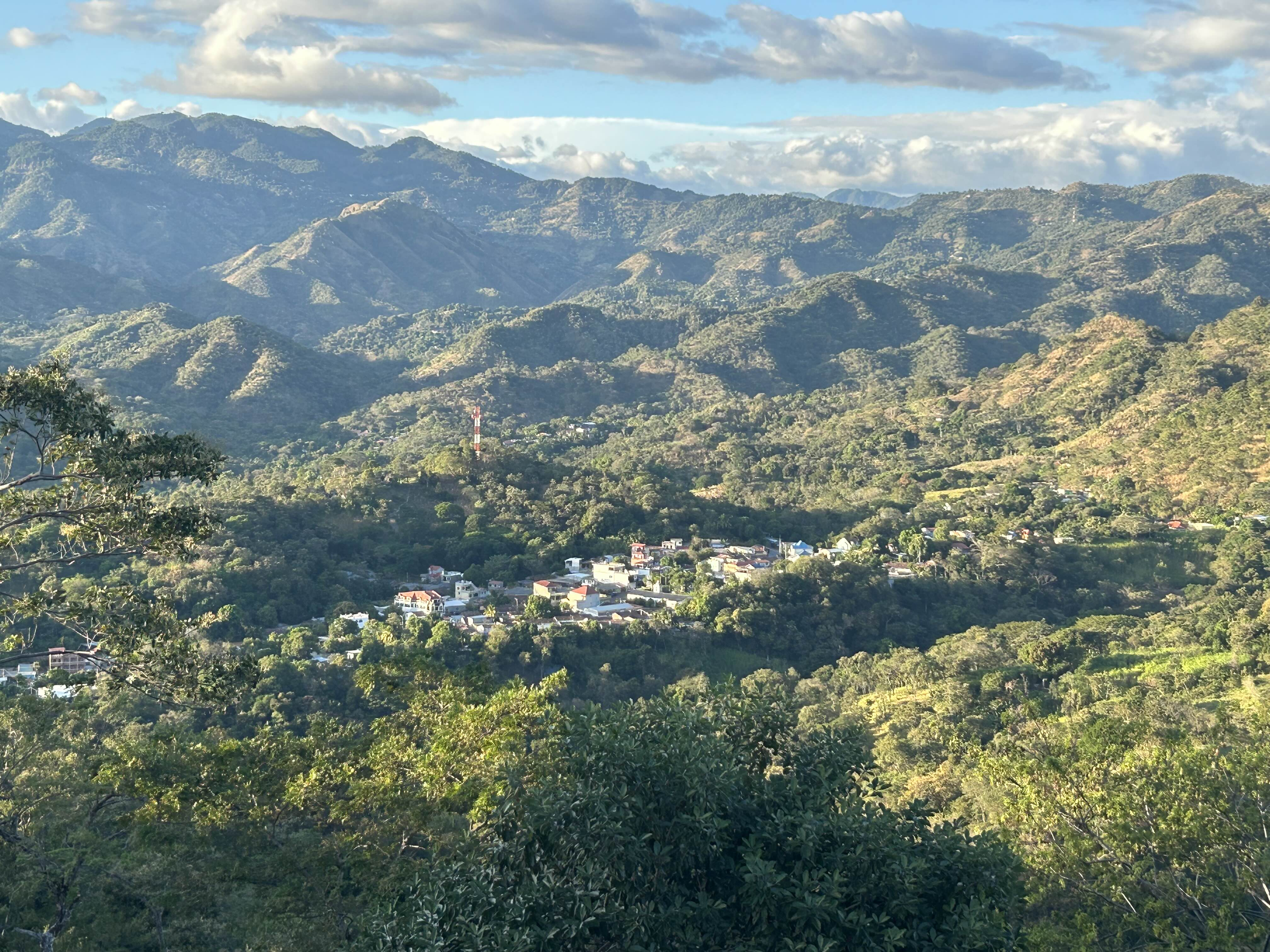

- Location in El Salvador
- Coordinates: 14°8′N 88°57′W
- Country: El Salvador
- Department: Chalatenango
- Municipality: Chalatenango Sur

Government

Area
  - District: 10.90 sq mi (28.22 km^{2})
- Elevation: 2,064 ft (629 m)

Population (2024)
  - District: 4,136
  - Rank: 210th in El Salvador
  - Rural: 4,136

Comalapa is a district in the Chalatenango Department of El Salvador.

== The municipality ==
Comalapa is bordered by the following municipalities: to the north, Dulce Nombre de María; to the east, La Laguna; to the south, Concepción Quezatepeque; to the West, Santa Rita and Dulce Nombre de María. The territorial extension of the municipality is 28.22 km.² In 2007 the population was 2,996 inhabitants. The municipality is divided into 4 cantons and 20 caseríos.

=== History of Comalapa ===
The civilization of El Salvador dates from the Pre-Columbian Era, from around 1500 BC. On May 31, 1522, the first of the Spanish, under the leadership of Captain Pedro de Alvarado, disembarked on the Isla Meanguera, located in the Gulf of Fonseca. In June 1524 Captain Alvarado began a war of conquest against the indigenous people of Cuzcatlán (land of precious things). After 17 days of bloody battles many people died but the Spanish were not defeated, so they continued their conquest. During the following centuries the Spanish maintained their control of the natives. Towards the end of 1810 the Priest José Matías Delgado, with the support of many people, began a rebellion. After years of struggle, the Central American Independence Act was signed in Guatemala, on September 15, 1821 (Embajada). Comalapa belonged to the department of San Salvador from June 12, 1824, until May 22, 1835.

1835 Marshall Bennett, main representative of Belize merchants and former slave holders, exploited the Tabanco mine.

From May 22, 1835, until February 14, 1855, it belonged to the department of Cuscatlán; and since this last date has belonged to Chalatenango. Since its foundation up until July 15, 1919, Comalapa belonged to the district of Chalatenango, and since then to the new district of Dulce Nombre de Maria. By law on March 12, 1947, this municipality lost the canton El Morro to Dulce Nombre de Maria.

Due to the repression of the landowners, in 1931 farmers and indigenous citizens began a rebellion (Lonely Planet). The army responded by killing 30,000 people, including the leader of the rebellion, Farabundo Martí, in a bloody act that was later referred to as La Matanza (The Massacre) (Lonely Planet). But the people remained unhappy with the government. This began a movement organized around leftist guerrillas to combat the repression violence (Stahler-Sholk, 1994:2). The government responded with violence, and the Death Squads were formed, which eventually tortured and killed thousands of people (Foley 2006). More political instability and the assassination of Archbishop Oscar Romero in 1980 sparked the beginning of the Civil War. This war, which lasted 12 years, resulted in the death of an estimated 75,000 people and the displacement of thousands more (Stahler-Sholk, 1994:3). The Peace Accords were signed on January 16, 1992 (Embajada).

The department of Chalatenango was heavily impacted by the Civil War. Many people of Comalapa were forced to abandon their homes because of the violence. But beginning the early 1990s, after the Peace Accords, the people have returned to repopulate the municipality.

== Politics ==
Período 2003 - 2006, the mayor of Comalapa was Francisco Emiliano Castro Guevara. The mayor of Comalapa is Moisés Antonio Marín Santamaría, of the ARENA.

== Cantones and caseríos ==
Candelaria:

- Candelaria
- La Cuchilla
- El Pilon

El Morro:

- El Morro
- La Pedrera
- Los Carvajal
- El Barrio
- El Tabanco
- El Roble
- Guevarita
- El Tablón

Guachipilin:

- Guachipilin
- El Pepeton
- Tierra Colorada
- Cuatro Pinos

La Junta:

- La Junta
- Chorosco
- Los Achotillos
- Los Barillas
- Los Irayoles

Source: Chalatenango Monografía del departamento y sus municipios. Instituto Geográfico Nacional Ingeniero Pablo Arnoldo Guzmán Centro Nacional de Registro. 1995.

=== Observation of the administrative political division ===
According to the inhabitants there is a caserío called Los Leones that is close to Candelaria, but does not appear in the above table. In addition the caseríos La Pedrera and el Barrio, of cantón El Morro, are considered to be the same caserío, called Barrio La Pedrera. The same is true of Los Carvajal and El Tabanco, which are actually the same caserío.

There is a caserío called La Triadera which belongs to cantón El Morro but does not appear in the table. The same is true of caserío Los Galdamez in the cantón Guachipilín. This thus does not reflect the evolution and changes of the definitions of the caseríos in recent times, nor does it reflect the feeling of belonging of the population.

=== Etymology of cantones and caseríos ===
Cantón Guachipilín was, according to the inhabitants, so named because of the abundant of guachipilín trees.

Cantón El Morro was, according to some of its inhabitants, named after a big round tree in the middle of the cantón.

Comalapa means “river of stones.”

La Coyotera was named after the many coyotes in the hills.

Cantón La Junta (together) was so named because that is where the rivers Azambio and Pacayas meet.

== Religion ==
Eighty-three percent of the population of El Salvador identifies as Roman Catholic, and the other 17% identify as “other”. But in the last few years the population of Catholicism has been reduced. There is a lot of Protestant activity in the country, and El Salvador has one of the highest rates of Protestantism in Latin America (Soltero y Saravia 2003:1). There is no doubt that religion plays an important role in the lives of many people. Patron-saint and other religious festivals are still very important and celebrated in almost all of the municipalities in the country, and almost all the cantones have their own patron-saint in whose honor the festival is celebrated.

=== Patron saint and other traditional festivals ===
- Urban center: The second week of January, A traditional festival for the business people; October 4, in honor of San Francisco of Asís; November 11–12, in honor of the Virgin of Asunción
- Candelaria: February 2, in honor of the Virgin of Candelaria
- El Morro: March 18–19, in honor San José del Morro
- Guachipilin: December 11–12, in honor of the Virgen de Guadalupe
- Caserío El Pepeton: January 18, in honor of St. Lucia
- La Junta: March 12–13, traditional festival; June 12–13, in honor of St. Anthony
- Caserío Los Varillas: December 12–13, in honor of the Virgen de Guadalupe

== Music and dances ==
Formerly the popular types of music were rancheras, boleros and valses. There were also instruments made out of leather, such as marimbas, which can still be found in Achotillo; carambas, which are big arcs that sound like violins and played with pieces of wire; and tambores, which were made out of a branch of an avocado tree and had a hole burned in the middle. Other popular instruments were guitars, dulzainas, and violins. This music is no longer popular.

Some formerly popular dances were La Raspa and El Arranca Polvo.

== Agricultural production ==
The agricultural production is something that has traditionally characterized the municipality. Among the crops are corn, beans, squash, sorghum (maicillo), and some vegetables. These crops serve mainly for family consumption, but in some cases are sold either directly or to middlemen.

It should be mentioned that now, in front of the crisis of agricultural production, the population has diminished their work and emigrated to the United States or tried to find other ways to survive.

Indigo used to be cultivated here, and one can still find parts of old manufacturing tools.

== Food and drink ==
Traditional foods include beans, tortillas, metas, soups, sweets, and seeds. Other traditional foods and dishes include:

- Las Cupas: a type of pupusa (corn tortilla stuffed with foods such as ground beans, cheese, and pork rinds) folded in half.
- Montuca: a travel Tamale made out of tender corn.
- Ticucas: made out of tortillas cooked in banana leaves, and in the middle is placed ground beans and egg or meat.
- For the patron-saint festivals the inhabitants usually make tamales out of chicken or pork, pasteles (a Salvadoran version of a wonton), and horchata (a drink of ground-up seeds).
- Ginger wine
- Torrejas: a dulce prepared during Easter week.
- Chaparro corriente o curado: used as a medicine for women after giving birth.

The majority of the ingredients used to make these foods and drinks are natural and are grown in the area. They also form part of the biodiversity that, in some cases, is threatened or in danger of extinction. Nevertheless, these habits are less common as more people eat commercially produced foods.

== Tourism sites ==
- La Coyotera Hill or Picacho Hill
- Vega River, El Morro
- La Aldea — Pacayas River: there are very beautiful waterfalls.
- The natural pool of Puente, on the path to Tablón.
- Guachipilín, in the Azambio River, has a round natural pool and waterfall.
- Turicentro la Vega del Mango

== Artisan products ==
Among the artisanal products created in the municipality of Comalapa are the following: nets, hammocks, belts, and purses. They have lost the practice of making a traditional thread (mezcal) from local plants, although there are still people who do it they are very few, and the material used to make it is located far away and they depend on intermediaries to bring the material. Different studies have been done about this production.

They also make important tools in order to be able to use the mezcal, such as tools to twist the thread and bamboo needles.

== Archaeological sites ==
- In Pueblo Viejo, that used to be Comalapa and is located half a kilometer above the road to La Laguna, there is an old clay water jug.
- At the La Cruz Hill there was a mudslide that was carried away a village, but there still remain parts of it.
- In Cerron Grande, in front of Guachipilín, there are pots, house foundations, and all types of pottery.
- Piedra del Tambor, in Tierra Colorada, close to Cuevitas, is located The Cave of the Hermit, which they also call Chupadero.
- In El Morro there is a farm which is called China Loma, and there are also house foundations on the path to La Lomita.

== Bibliography ==
- Foley, Michael W. 2006. Laying the Groundwork: The Struggle for Civil Society in El Salvador. Journal of Interamerican Studies and World Affairs. 38 (1): 67-104.
- Stahler-Sholk, Richard. 1994. El Salvador's Negotiated Transition: From Low-Intensity Conflict to Low-IntensityDemocracy. Journal of Interamerican Studies and World Affairs. 36 (4): 1-59.
