= San Fernando, Chalatenango =

San Fernando
- District
- Location in El Salvador
- Coordinates: 14°18′N 89°2′W
- Country: El Salvador
- Department: Chalatenango
- Municipality: Chalatenango Centro
- Elevation: 3,484 ft (1,062 m)

Population (2024)
  - District: 2,512
  - Rank: 242nd in El Salvador
  - Urban: 10
  - Rural: 2,502

San Fernando is a district in the Chalatenango Department of El Salvador.
