= Tejutla, El Salvador =

Tejutla
- District
- Location in El Salvador
- Coordinates: 14°10′N 89°6′W
- Country: El Salvador
- Department: Chalatenango
- Municipality: Chalatenango Centro
- Elevation: 1,243 ft (379 m)

Population (2024)
  - District: 13,556
  - Rank: 100th in El Salvador
  - Urban: 4,050
  - Rural: 9,506
- Time zone: UTC-6 (CST)
  - Summer (DST): UTC-5 (-EST)

Tejutla is a district in the Chalatenango Department of El Salvador.
