= Chalatenango Department =

Department of El Salvador

Chalatenango
- Department
- Flag

- Location within El Salvador
- Coordinates: 14°10′23″N 89°04′34″W
- Country: El Salvador
- Established: 14 February 1855
- Capital: Chalatenango

Government
  - Governor: Amílcar Iván Monge Monge (NI)

Area
  - Total: 778.61 sq mi (2,016.58 km^{2})
  - Rank: 5th
- Highest elevation: 8,960 ft (2,730 m)

Population (2024 census)
  - Total: 185,930
  - Rank: 10th
  - Density: 238.80/sq mi (92.201/km^{2})
- Time zone: UTC−5 (CST)
- ISO 3166 code: SV-CH
- Website: chalatenango.sv

Chalatenango (Spanish pronunciation: [tʃalateˈnaŋɡo]) is a department of El Salvador located in the northwest of the country. The department's capital city is the city of Chalatenango, which shares the same name as the department. Chalatenango covers a land area of 778.61 square miles (2,016.58 km^{2}) and contains over 185,930 inhabitants. Chalatenango's maximum elevation, located at Cerro El Pital (the country's highest point), is 8,960 feet (2,730 m).

Amílcar Iván Monge Monge of Nuevas Ideas has been the governor of Chalatenango since 2020.

== Etymology ==
The name Chalatenango derives from the Nawat words chal or shal meaning "sand", at meaning "water" or "river", and tenango meaning "valley". (Note: "Tenango" is also a Nahuatl suffix meaning "place of".) In its entirety, "Chalatenango" means "valley of sandy waters".

== History ==
The indigenous peoples of the Americas had lived in the region of the modern-day Chalatenango department for over one thousand five hundred years before the arrival of the Spanish in the 1500s. The indigenous people of the area lived in densely populated communities and cultivated maize. From 1524 to 1539, the Spanish conquered the territories of modern-day El Salvador, including Chalatenango.

In 1790, Francisco Luis Héctor de Carondelet, the colonial intendant of the Intendancy of San Salvador, recruited laborers from the Spanish regions of Asturias, Cantabria, and Galicia to work in the production of indigo in the modern-day region of the Chalatenango department. The laborers were recruited due to a decrease in the indigenous population in the area. As a result, Chalatenango saw a significant increase of a lighter-skinned populace compared to the rest of El Salvador.

On 14 February 1855, the Senate of El Salvador separated the Chalatenango and Tejutla districts from the department of Cuscatlán and established the Chalatenango Department with the city of Chalatenango as its capital.

During the 1700s and 1800s, Chalatenango was mostly dependent on indigo production, however, the fall of indigo prices in the 1860s led to the department falling into a state of impoverishment. Since then, Chalatenango was one of the country's poorest departments, as most impoverished peasant farmers in El Salvador lived in the department, especially during the 1960s and 1970s. In 1961, 56 percent of the urban population was literate, while only 27 percent of the rural population was literate. During the 1970s, Chalatenango only had one hospital, and only 57 percent of the population had access to any type of medical clinic; only one third of households had running water and only 16 percent had access to electricity. In 1971, the local minimum wage in Chalatenango was SVC₡1.00 to 2.50 per day, compared to the national minimum wage of SVC₡2.75 per day, and in 1975, Chalatenango had an unemployment rate of 40 percent, the highest of any department.

The Chalatenango department was a military stronghold for the Farabundo Martí Popular Liberation Forces (FPL) and the People's Revolutionary Bloc (BPR), two Marxist armed organizations, during the 1970s due to the department's mountainous terrain. The department continued to be a military stronghold for the Farabundo Martí National Liberation Front (FMLN), a left-wing guerrilla group which the FPL was a founding member of, during the Salvadoran Civil War (1979–1992). Due to its nature as a guerrilla stronghold, several military operations conducted by both sides of the civil war occurred in Chalatenango. During the civil war, many refugees fled south to the shore of Lake Suchitlán or left the department entirely for either Honduras or the United States. Many mayors in northern Chalatenango also fled their municipalities, leaving them to be effectively controlled by the FMLN; during and after the civil war, references were made by locals that there were "two Chalatenangos", one under government control and one under guerrilla control. By 1983, the FMLN held 15 of the department's 13 municipalities. Several civil war massacres occurred in Chalatenango, including the 1980 Sumpul River massacre and the 1982 Santa Rita massacre.

From 1992 to 1995, following the conclusion of the civil war, the Municipalities-in-Action (MEA) program listed 20 out of the department's 33 municipalities as "reconstruction municipalities" as they were severely damaged during the civil war, most of which were located in territories controlled by the FMLN. The MEA allocated SVC₡85 million (equivalent of US$9.75 million) to Chalatenango to help built schools, clinics, roads, and water systems, the highest amount given to any department.

== Geography ==
Chalatenango covers a land area of 778.61 square miles (2,016.58 km^{2}). As of 2005, 2.30 square miles (5.96 km^{2}) of Chalatenango's land was urban area and the remaining 1,979.78 square kilometres (764.40 sq mi) was rural.

== Demographics ==
Historical population
Year	Pop.	±%
1770	36,000	—
1892	54,000	+50.0%
1913	74,000	+37.0%
1916	80,722	+9.1%
1971	172,075	+113.2%
2007	192,788	+12.0%
2024	185,930	−3.6%

The population of Chalatenango increased by over 50 percent between 1770 and 1892, compared to national figure of 32 percent; the department's population in 1892 totaled around 54,000 people. In 1913, Chalatenango had 74,000 residents, and three years later, it had 80,722 residents. By 1971, the department's population had increased to 172,075, but by then, its population growth had fallen to 2.3 percent per year, the lowest of any department. During the 1970s, Chalatenango had the highest rate of internal migration at –16.1 percent. In 2007, Chalatenango had a population of 192,788, the fourth smallest department by population. In 2024, Chalatenango had a population of 185,930.

== Administrative divisions ==
=== Municipalities ===
On 13 June 2023, 67 of the 84 deputies of the Legislative Assembly of El Salvador voted in favor of a bill proposed by President Nayib Bukele to reduce the total number of the country's municipalities from 262 to 44. As a result, Chalatenango's 33 municipalities were consolidated into 3, known as Chalatenango Norte, Chalatenango Centro, and Chalatenango Sur; the 33 municipalities remained extant as districts, and the change went into effect on 1 May 2024.

The following are Chalatenango's three municipalities:

1. Chalatenango Centro
2. Chalatenango Norte
3. Chalatenango Sur

=== Districts ===
The Chalatenango department consists of 33 districts, the most of any department in El Salvador. The 33 districts are often grouped into three zones: north, central, and south. The department's 33 districts, listed in alphabetical order, are:

1. Agua Caliente
2. Arcatao
3. Azacualpa
4. Chalatenango (capital)
5. Citalá
6. Comalapa
7. Concepción Quezaltepeque
8. Dulce Nombre de María
9. El Carrizal
10. El Paraíso
11. La Laguna
12. La Palma
13. La Reina
14. Las Flores
15. Las Vueltas
16. Nombre de Jesús
17. Nueva Concepción
18. Nueva Trinidad
19. Ojos de Agua
20. Potonico
21. San Antonio de la Cruz
22. San Antonio Los Ranchos
23. San Fernando
24. San Francisco Lempa
25. San Francisco Morazán
26. San Ignacio
27. San Isidro Labrador
28. San José Cancasque
29. San Luis del Carmen
30. San Miguel de Mercedes
31. San Rafael
32. Santa Rita
33. Tejutla

== Agriculture ==
The department heavily relies on agriculture to sustain its population. Crops such as maize, beans, and vegetables are cultivated on around 3.5 percent of the department's land, meanwhile, cattle are raised on around 35 percent of its land.

== Infrastructure ==
Chalatenango has two main roads which travel through the department. The first, the Northern Trunk Highway (CA4), connects San Salvador, the country's capital city, in the south with the Honduran border in the north. The second, the Longitudinal Trunk Highway (CA3), connects the departments of Santa Ana in the west and Cabañas in the east. Other highways include the Arcatao Highway (CHA07) connecting the city of Chalatenango with Arcatao, the La Montañona Perimeter Ring (CHA07) connecting the Concepción Quezaltepeque with Ojos de Agua via the city of Chalatenango, and the Dulce Nombre de María–San Fernando Road (CHA13) which connects the two aforementioned municipalities.

== Crime ==
Chalatenango used to be under in influence of the Mara Salvatrucha (MS-13) criminal gang, specifically its Fulton Locos Salvatruchos cell, until May 2023 when the Salvadoran government began a blockade of Nueva Concepción (the gang's primary stronghold) to extract and arrest gang members as a part of the country's gang crackdown. The Texis Cartel also operated out of Chalatenango. Common crimes which were committed in Chalatenango included arms trafficking, drug trafficking (such as cocaine and marijuana), human trafficking, and extortion.

== Symbols ==
The flag of Chalatenango consists of a blue-white-green tricolor; blue represents the sky, white represents peace, and green represents the department's mountains. The white band contains the name "Chalatenango" in all-caps and the green band contains a depiction of a plow in the lower-left corner. Patrocinio Córdova Aguilar designed the flag in 1969.

== See also ==
- Departments of El Salvador
