= San Rafael, El Salvador =

San Rafael
- District
- Location in El Salvador
- Coordinates: 14°8′N 89°2′W
- Country: El Salvador
- Department: Chalatenango
- Municipality: Chalatenango Centro
- Elevation: 1,175 ft (358 m)

Population (2024)
  - District: 3,964
  - Rank: 213th in El Salvador
  - Rural: 3,964

San Rafael is a district in the Chalatenango Department of El Salvador.
