= ADFAS =

Salvadoran association football league

La Asociación Departamental de Fútbol Aficionado
- Country: El Salvador
- Confederation: CONCACAF
- Level on pyramid: 4
- Promotion to: Tercera División
- Relegation to: ADFAS Segunda
- Current champions: To be determined
- Broadcaster(s): TCS; Canal 10
- Current: 2025–26 ADFAS

The La Asociación Departamental de Fútbol Aficionado is the fourth tier of football in the Salvadoran football Federation.

It was announced March 9, 2026 FESUT announced that they will change from La Asociación Departamental de Fútbol Aficionado (ADFA) to Red Departamental de Desarrollo del Fútbol (RedDFUT).

== Teams promoted from ADFA to Tercera Division ==
Season	Winner (Occidental)	Winner (Central)	Winner (Oriental)
2015–16	TBD	TBD	TBD
2016–17	Turin FESA	None	Platense Morazán
2017–18	El Cerrón	TBD (Cangrejera Fc)	San Felipe FC (La Unión)
2018–19	TBD	Cangrejera Fc	TBD
2019–20	None (due to COVID)	None (due to COVID)	None (due to COVID)
2020–21	TBD	TBD	TBD
2021–22	C.D. INCA	C.D. Cruzeiro	C.D. Pipil
2022–23	F.C. Los Laureles	Club Atlético Verapaz; C.D. San Carlos	CD Platence
2023–24	Escuela de Futbol Izalco Mario Calvo	Santa Clara; Real Antiguo Cuscatlan	Club Deportivo San Marcos (Usulutan)
2024–25	Atletico Belén	A.D. Nacional Las Margaritas; Nonualco F.C.	Racing de Gualuca
2025–26	TBD	TBD; TBD	TBD
2026–27	TBD	TBD; TBD	TBD

== Teams relegated from Tercera Division to ADFA ==
- 2016–17: Alacran del Rosario de La Paz, Santiagueno, Fuerte San Isidro
- 2017–18: C.D. Salvadoreno and ADO Municipal
- 2018–19: TBD and TBD
- 2019–20: None (due to COVID)
- 2020–21: TBD and TBD
- 2021–22: TBD and TBD
- 2022–23: C.D. Platence, El Remolino, FC Soyapango Santa Ana, Promesas del fútbol de San Sebastián Salitrillo
- 2023–24: TBD and TBD
- 2024–25:
- 2025–26: AD SESSA; A.D. Nacional Las Margaritas

== Groups 2025–26 ==
=== Asociaciones Departamentales de Fútbol Aficionado (ADFA) - Sonsonate ===
==== Group 1 ====
Team name	Founded	Hometown	Coaches
Salvadoreño	1917	(El Salvador) Armenia, Sonsonate, Sonsonate	(El Salvador) TBD
FC Surf City	19	(El Salvador) Armenia, Sonsonate, Sonsonate	(El Salvador) TBD
Campana F.C.	19	(El Salvador) TBD	(El Salvador) TBD
Juventud Sunza	2019	(El Salvador) TBD	(El Salvador) TBD
Escuela de Futbol de Izalco	19	(El Salvador) TBD	(El Salvador) TBD
Juventud Vendaval	2019	(El Salvador) TBD	(El Salvador) TBD
Juventud Caluco	2019	(El Salvador) TBD	(El Salvador) TBD
Escuela de Futbol Armenia	19	(El Salvador) TBD, TBD	(El Salvador) TBD
Balsamar FC	19	(El Salvador) TBD, TBD	(El Salvador) TBD
C.D. Tibrones los Cob	19	(El Salvador) TBD	(El Salvador) TBD
EF Virtientes	19	(El Salvador) TBD	(El Salvador) TBD
CD Las Palmas	19	(El Salvador) TBD	(El Salvador) TBD
Renacimiento FC	19	(El Salvador) TBD	(El Salvador) TBD

=== Asociaciones Departamentales de Fútbol Aficionado (ADFA) - San Salvador ===
==== Group 1 ====
Team name	Founded	Hometown	Coaches
San Jeronimo F.C.	19	(El Salvador) TBD, TBD	(El Salvador) TBD
San Salvador Oeste	19	(El Salvador) TBD, TBD	(El Salvador) TBD
Cruzeiro FC	19	(El Salvador) TBD, TBD	(El Salvador) TBD
AD Mides	19	(El Salvador) TBD, TBD	(El Salvador) TBD
San Jeronimo Nejapa	19	(El Salvador) TBD	(El Salvador) TBD
San Jeronimo Bronco	19	(El Salvador) TBD	(El Salvador) TBD
Turin F.C.	19	(El Salvador) TBD, TBD	(El Salvador) TBD
La Fuente FC	19	(El Salvador) TBD, TBD	(El Salvador) TBD
CD Fuerte Aguilares (Reserves)	19	(El Salvador) TBD, TBD	(El Salvador) TBD

==== Group 2 ====
Team name	Founded	Hometown	Coaches
Amigos de Cristo	19	(El Salvador) TBD	(El Salvador) TBD
ADET	19	(El Salvador) TBD	(El Salvador) TBD
A.D. Mejicanos	19	(El Salvador) TBD	(El Salvador) TBD
A.D. Juventud Olimpica	19	(El Salvador) TBD, TBD	(El Salvador) TBD
Atletico Marte	19	(El Salvador) TBD, TBD	(El Salvador) Juarez
Santiagueno	19	(El Salvador) TBD	(El Salvador) TBD
Salesianos FC	19	(El Salvador) TBD	(El Salvador) TBD
Santa Alegria FC	19	(El Salvador) TBD	(El Salvador) Fabricio Trejo
San Marcos Municipal	19	(El Salvador) TBD	(El Salvador) Carlos "El Móica" Gómez Navas
Palmeiras	19	(El Salvador) TBD, TBD	(El Salvador) TBD
C.D. Balboa	19	(El Salvador) TBD, TBD	(El Salvador) TBD

==== Group 3 ====
Team name	Founded	Hometown	Coaches
Lomas Del Rio	19	(El Salvador) TBD, TBD	(El Salvador) TBD
F.C. Soyapango	19	(El Salvador) TBD	(El Salvador) TBD
F.C. Marte Soyapango	19	(El Salvador) TBD, TBD	(El Salvador) TBD
AD Nacional Las Margaritas	19	(El Salvador) TBD	(El Salvador) TBD
Escuela de Futbol Black Horse	19	(El Salvador) TBD, TBD	(El Salvador) TBD
Cuscatancingo	19	(El Salvador) TBD, TBD	(El Salvador) TBD
Club Deportivo San Jose	2023	(El Salvador) TBD, TBD	(El Salvador) TBD
Municipal Cuscatleco	19	(El Salvador) TBD, TBD	(El Salvador) TBD
F.C. Los Angeles	19	(El Salvador) TBD	(El Salvador) TBD
Atletico Alta Vista	2022	(El Salvador) TBD, TBD	(El Salvador) TBD
Talleres de Soyapango	19	(El Salvador) TBD	(El Salvador) TBD

=== Asociaciones Departamentales de Fútbol Aficionado (ADFA) - San Miguel ===
==== Group 1 ====
Team name	Founded	Hometown	Coaches
CD Sesor	19	(El Salvador) TBD	(El Salvador) TBD
Fuerte San Jose	19	(El Salvador) TBD	(El Salvador) TBD
Obrajuelo F.C.	19	(El Salvador) TBD, TBD	(El Salvador) TBD
Flor de Cafe	19	(El Salvador) TBD, TBD	(El Salvador) TBD
Agave	19	(El Salvador) TBD, TBD	(El Salvador) TBD
Atlético Chaparratique	1943	(El Salvador) Moncagua,	(El Salvador) TBD
CD Once Lobos	19	(El Salvador) TBD, TBD	(El Salvador) TBDv
C.D. Fuerte San Antonio ]	19	(El Salvador) TBD	(El Salvador) TBD
C.D. Fuerte San Martin ]	19	(El Salvador) TBD	(El Salvador) TBD
C.D. Racing	19	(El Salvador) TBD, TBD	(El Salvador) TBD
C.D. Espana	19	(El Salvador) TBD, TBD	(El Salvador) TBD
Atletico Juvenil	19	(El Salvador) TBD, TBD	(El Salvador) TBD

==== Group 2 ====
Team name	Founded	Hometown	Coaches
C.D. Finca Miramar	19	(El Salvador) TBD, TBD	(El Salvador) TBD
C.D. Internacional	1966	(El Salvador) Canton El Nino, TBD	(El Salvador) TBD
FC Nuevo Cocolondia	19	(El Salvador) TBD	(El Salvador) TBD
San Isidro FC	19	(El Salvador) TBD	(El Salvador) TBD
C.D. Quelepenses	19	(El Salvador) TBD	(El Salvador) TBD
Fuerte Guadalupano	19	(El Salvador) Canton El Amate	(El Salvador) TBD
C.D. Guadalupano	19	(El Salvador) Nueva Guadalupano, San Miguel	(El Salvador) TBD
C.D. Espana Santa Lucia	19	(El Salvador) Canton Las Lomitas, San Miguel	(El Salvador) TBD
CD Central Olimpico	19	(El Salvador) TBD	(El Salvador) TBD
Vendaval FC	19	(El Salvador) TBD	(El Salvador) TBD
CD Carolinese	19	(El Salvador) TBD	(El Salvador) TBD

==== Group 3 ====
Team name	Founded	Hometown	Coaches
C.D. Colo Colo	19	(El Salvador) TBD, TBD	(El Salvador) TBD
C.D. Azul Y Blanco	1937	(El Salvador) TBD	(El Salvador) TBD
C.D. Charlaix	19	(El Salvador) La Fuerta, San Miguel	(El Salvador) TBD
C.D. Cuscatlan	1940	(El Salvador) Las Lomitas, TBD	(El Salvador) TBD
Liverpool FC	19	(El Salvador) TBD	(El Salvador) TBD
C.D. Once Rojos	19	(El Salvador) TBD, TBD	(El Salvador) TBDv
C.D. Atletico Santaines	19	(El Salvador) Canton El Nino, San Miguel	(El Salvador) TBD
C.D. UTAM	19	(El Salvador) TBD, TBD	(El Salvador) TBD
C.D. Atletico San Sebastian	19	(El Salvador) Canton El Nino, San Miguel	(El Salvador) TBD
C.D. Spanta Luisa	19	(El Salvador) TBD, TBD	(El Salvador) TBD
Valencia FC	2017	(El Salvador) TBD	(El Salvador) TBD
Canteras F.C.	19	(El Salvador) Canton El Nino, TBD	(El Salvador) TBD

==== Group 4 ====
Team name	Founded	Hometown	Coaches
Perlas F.C.	19	(El Salvador) TBD, TBD	(El Salvador) TBD
Mega Clutch F.C.	2017	(El Salvador) TBD	(El Salvador) TBD
San Alejo F.C.	19	(El Salvador) TBD, TBD	(El Salvador) TBD
C.D. Real Espana	19	(El Salvador) TBD	(El Salvador) TBD
C.D. Peces Voladores	19	(El Salvador) TBD, TBD	(El Salvador) TBD
Yayantique F.C.	19	(El Salvador) TBD, TBD	(El Salvador) TBD
San Alejo F.C.	2023	(El Salvador) TBD, TBD	(El Salvador) TBD
C.D. Atletico San Francisco	19	(El Salvador) TBD, TBD	(El Salvador) TBD
CD Zafir	2023	(El Salvador) TBD, TBD	(El Salvador) TBD
C.D. Nuevo Juventud	19	(El Salvador) TBD, TBD	(El Salvador) TBD
C.D. Belen Santa Emilia	19	(El Salvador) TBD, TBD	(El Salvador) TBD
C.D. Buenos Aires	19	(El Salvador) TBD, TBD	(El Salvador) TBD

==== Group 5 ====
Team name	Founded	Hometown	Coaches
Bangu FC	1964	(El Salvador) Canton El Brazo, San Miguel	(El Salvador) TBD
C.D. Yamaha	19	(El Salvador) Puerto Viejo, San Miguel	(El Salvador) TBD
C.D. 11 Aguilas del Sur	1972	(El Salvador) Crio Cantora, San Miguel	(El Salvador) TBD
C.D. Aguila Lagunence	19	(El Salvador) Puerto Viejo, San Miguel	(El Salvador) TBD
C.D. Supremo	1958	(El Salvador) San Pedro, Chirilagua	(El Salvador) TBD
C.D. Herediano F.C.	1985	(El Salvador) Canton El Brazo, San Miguel	(El Salvador) TBD
C.D. Santa Fidelia	19	(El Salvador) TBD, TBD	(El Salvador) TBD
Racing FC	2023	(El Salvador) Gualuca, San Miguel	(El Salvador) TBD
C.D. Galaxi	19	(El Salvador) TBD, TBD	(El Salvador) TBD
C.D. El Cuco	2023	(El Salvador) TBD, TBD	(El Salvador) TBD
CD Santa Maria	19	(El Salvador) TBD, TBD	(El Salvador) TBD
Chilanguera	19	(El Salvador) TBD, TBD	(El Salvador) TBD

=== Asociaciones Departamentales de Fútbol Aficionado (ADFA) - Morazan ===
==== Group 1 ====
Team name	Founded	Hometown	Coaches
San Diego F.C.	2015	(El Salvador) TBD, TBD	(El Salvador) TBD
Milan F.C.	2013	(El Salvador) TBD	(El Salvador) TBD
C.D. Boillat	1979	(El Salvador) TBD, TBD	(El Salvador) TBD
Real San Antonio	19	(El Salvador) TBD	(El Salvador) TBD
El Rosario FC	19	(El Salvador) TBD	(El Salvador) TBD
C.D. Armbala	19	(El Salvador) TBD, TBD	(El Salvador) TBD
Real San Francisco	19	(El Salvador) TBD	(El Salvador) TBD
C.D. Alacranes Joateca	1984	(El Salvador) TBD	(El Salvador) TBD
C.D. Real Perquin	19	(El Salvador) TBD, TBD	(El Salvador) TBD
Gualococti	19	(El Salvador) TBD, TBD	(El Salvador) TBD
Atletico Juvenil	19	(El Salvador) TBD	(El Salvador) TBD

==== Group 2 ====
Team name	Founded	Hometown	Coaches
Yoloaiquin	19	(El Salvador) TBD, TBD	(El Salvador) TBD
C.D. Huracan	19	(El Salvador) TBD	(El Salvador) TBD
C.D. Platence	2013	(El Salvador) TBD, TBD	(El Salvador) TBD
Flor de Cafe	19	(El Salvador) TBD, TBD	(El Salvador) TBD
Guatajiagua	2001	(El Salvador) TBD	(El Salvador) TBD
Fuerte San Isidro	19	(El Salvador) TBD, TBD	(El Salvador) TBD
Atletico San Jose	19	(El Salvador) TBD	(El Salvador) TBD
Osirala F.C.	2023	(El Salvador) TBD, TBD	(El Salvador) TBD
C.D. La Joya	19	(El Salvador) TBD, TBD	(El Salvador) TBD
C.D. Independiente	19	(El Salvador) TBD	(El Salvador) TBD
C.D. Borussia	19	(El Salvador) TBD	(El Salvador) TBD
C.D. Magdalena	19	(El Salvador) TBD, TBD	(El Salvador) TBD

==== Group 3 ====
Team name	Founded	Hometown	Coaches
Cruzeiro Juventud	19	(El Salvador) TBD	(El Salvador) TBD
AD Corinto	19	(El Salvador) TBD, TBD	(El Salvador) TBD
Gotera F.C.	2021	(El Salvador) TBD, TBD	(El Salvador) TBD
Coroban F.C.	1970	(El Salvador) TBD, TBD	(El Salvador) TBD
Silver Stars	19	(El Salvador) TBD, TBD	(El Salvador) TBD
Cacaopera F.C.	19	(El Salvador) TBD	(El Salvador) TBD
Atletico Juvenil Colotio	1984	(El Salvador) TBD	(El Salvador) TBD
Real Sociedad	19	(El Salvador) TBD, TBD	(El Salvador) TBD
Real Morazan	19	(El Salvador) TBD	(El Salvador) TBD
C.D. Santa Clara	19	(El Salvador) TBD, TBD	(El Salvador) TBD
COL. San Jose	19	(El Salvador) TBD	(El Salvador) TBD

=== Asociaciones Departamentales de Fútbol Aficionado (ADFA) - Usulutan ===
==== Group 1 ====
Team name	Founded	Hometown	Coaches
C.D. Aguila Roja	19	(El Salvador) El Almendro, Jucuarán	(El Salvador) TBD
C.D. Montefresco	19	(El Salvador) TBD, Concepción Batres	(El Salvador) TBD
C.D. Mejicapa	19	(El Salvador) Mejicapa, Santa Maria	(El Salvador) TBD
C.D. Huracan Batres	1930	(El Salvador) TBD, Concepción Batres	(El Salvador) TBD
Atletico Guerrero	19	(El Salvador) TBD, Concepción Batres	(El Salvador) TBD
C.D. Palo Galan	19	(El Salvador) TBD, Usulután	(El Salvador) TBD
Concepcion Cabanas	19	(El Salvador) TBD	(El Salvador) TBD
C.D. Sport Herediano	19	(El Salvador) TBD, Santa Elena	(El Salvador) TBD
Vendaval F.C.	19	(El Salvador) TBD, Santa Elena	(El Salvador) TBD
C.D. America	19	(El Salvador) TBD	(El Salvador) TBD
C.D. Atlantico	19	(El Salvador) TBD, Ereguayquín	(El Salvador) TBD
C.D. Peñarol	19	(El Salvador) TBD, Ereguayquín	(El Salvador) TBD
El Remolino	1910	(El Salvador) Santa Elena, Usulutan	(El Salvador) TBD

==== Group 2 ====
Team name	Founded	Hometown	Coaches
CD FAS Oriental	19	(El Salvador) TBD, TBD	(El Salvador) TBD
C.D. San Dionisio	19	(El Salvador) TBD, TBD	(El Salvador) TBD
Atletico Alcancia	19	(El Salvador) TBD, TBD	(El Salvador) TBD
11 Tiburones	19	(El Salvador) TBD, TBD	(El Salvador) TBD
C.D. Caterpillas	19	(El Salvador) TBD, TBD	(El Salvador) TBD
C.D. Aceituno Handal	19	(El Salvador) TBD	(El Salvador) TBD
Atletico Bilbao	19	(El Salvador) TBD	(El Salvador) TBD
Orion FC	19	(El Salvador) TBD, TBD	(El Salvador) TBD
C.D. Cerro Porteno	19	(El Salvador) TBD, TBD	(El Salvador) TBD
C.D. Usuluteco	19	(El Salvador) TBD, TBD	(El Salvador) TBD
Nuevo Renacimiento	19	(El Salvador) TBD, TBD	(El Salvador) TBD
C.D. Renacimiento	19	(El Salvador) TBD, TBD	(El Salvador) TBD

==== Group 3 ====
Team name	Founded	Hometown	Coaches
C.D. La Carrera	19	(El Salvador) TBD, TBD	(El Salvador) TBD
C.D. Vista Hermosa Jiquilisco	19	(El Salvador) TBD, TBD	(El Salvador) TBD
C.D. Tres Puntos del Oro	19	(El Salvador) TBD, TBD	(El Salvador) TBD
C.D. Adrian Cerrano	19	(El Salvador) TBD, Usulután	(El Salvador) TBD
Central F.C.	19	(El Salvador) TBD, TBD	(El Salvador) TBD
A.D. Tercio	19	(El Salvador) TBD, TBD	(El Salvador) TBD
C.D. Los Toros	19	(El Salvador) TBD, Usulután	(El Salvador) TBD
C.D. El Milagro	19	(El Salvador) TBD, TBD	(El Salvador) TBD
C.D. 11 Estrellas Planes	19	(El Salvador) TBD, TBD	(El Salvador) TBD
C.D. Titan Juvenil	19	(El Salvador) TBD, TBD	(El Salvador) TBD
Azul Y Blanco	19	(El Salvador) TBD	(El Salvador) TBD
Atletico La Merced	19	(El Salvador) TBD, Usulután	(El Salvador) TBD

==== Group 4 ====
Team name	Founded	Hometown	Coaches
C.D. Once Estrellas	19	(El Salvador) TBD, TBD	(El Salvador) TBD
Teco Luna F.C.	19	(El Salvador) TBD	(El Salvador) TBD
Jiquilisco F.C.	19	(El Salvador) TBD, TBD	(El Salvador) TBD
C.D. Villa Espana	2019	(El Salvador) San Agustín, Usulután	(El Salvador) TBD
C.D. San Agustin	19	(El Salvador) TBD	(El Salvador) TBD
C.D. Mar Y Plata	19	(El Salvador) TBD	(El Salvador) TBD
C.D. FAL	19	(El Salvador) TBD, TBD	(El Salvador) TBD
Espíritu Santo	1961	(El Salvador) Isla el Jobal, Usulután	(El Salvador) TBD
C.D. Rivoli	19	(El Salvador) TBD	(El Salvador) TBD
A.D. El Tablon	19	(El Salvador) TBD	(El Salvador) TBD
C.D. San Antonio	19	(El Salvador) TBD	(El Salvador) TBD
C.D. Las Moras	19	(El Salvador) TBD, TBD	(El Salvador) TBD

==== Group 5 ====
Team name	Founded	Hometown	Coaches
Aurora FC Jiquuilisco	19	(El Salvador) TBD, TBD	(El Salvador) TBD
C.D. Imperial Jiquilisco	19	(El Salvador) TBD, TBD	(El Salvador) TBD
America Juvenil	19	(El Salvador) TBD, TBD	(El Salvador) TBD
C.D. Estrella Roja San Agustin	19	(El Salvador) TBD	(El Salvador) TBD
Atletico Juvenil	19	(El Salvador) TBD, TBD	(El Salvador) TBD
A.D. La Fortaleza	19	(El Salvador) TBD, TBD	(El Salvador) TBD
C.D. Joisme	19	(El Salvador) TBD	(El Salvador) TBD
La Papalota	19	(El Salvador) TBD, TBD	(El Salvador) TBD
C.D. Mata de Pina	19	(El Salvador) TBD, TBD	(El Salvador) TBD
Bethel Del Pacifico	19	(El Salvador) TBD, TBD	(El Salvador) TBD
Nueva Esperanza	19	(El Salvador) TBD, TBD	(El Salvador) TBD
Brisas Marina	19	(El Salvador) TBD, TBD	(El Salvador) TBD

==== Group 6 ====
Team name	Founded	Hometown	Coaches
C.D. Brigido Rigoberto Almendares	19	(El Salvador) TBD	(El Salvador) TBD
C.D. Tigre Santiago de Maria	19	(El Salvador) TBD, TBD	(El Salvador) TBD
C.D. Real Mercedeno	19	(El Salvador) TBD, TBD	(El Salvador) TBD
C.D. Fenix Mercedes Umana	19	(El Salvador) TBD, TBD	(El Salvador) TBD
Atletico Masferrer	19	(El Salvador) TBD	(El Salvador) TBD
Brigido F.C.	19	(El Salvador) TBD, TBD	(El Salvador) TBD
Los Carballeros	19	(El Salvador) TBD	(El Salvador) TBD
C.D. Santa Anita	19	(El Salvador) TBD, TBD	(El Salvador) TBD
C.D. Triunfeno	19	(El Salvador) TBD, TBD	(El Salvador) TBD
Brisas del Tigre	19	(El Salvador) TBD, TBD	(El Salvador) TBD
Atletico Concepcion	19	(El Salvador) TBD, TBD	(El Salvador) TBD
C.D. El Delirio	19	(El Salvador) TBD, TBD	(El Salvador) TBD

=== Asociaciones Departamentales de Fútbol Aficionado (ADFA) - La Libertad ===
(Jayaque, ADET Jr, Juventud Independiente, Fuerte San Isidro, Santa Rosa FC, CD La Cruz, CD Atlético San Felipe, CD Venus)

==== Group 1 ====
Team name	Founded	Hometown	Coaches
Tinteral	19	(El Salvador) TBD, TBD	(El Salvador) TBD
UDC	19	(El Salvador) TBD	(El Salvador) TBD
FAS	19	(El Salvador) TBD, TBD	(El Salvador) TBD
San Andres	19	(El Salvador) TBD	(El Salvador) TBD
San Nicolas	19	(El Salvador) TBD, TBD	(El Salvador) TBD
C.D. Independiente	19	(El Salvador) TBD, TBD	(El Salvador) TBD
INCA	19	(El Salvador) TBD	(El Salvador) TBD
Santos	19	(El Salvador) TBD, TBD	(El Salvador) TBD
Arcense	19	(El Salvador) TBD	(El Salvador) TBD
Renacimimiento	19	(El Salvador) TBD, TBD	(El Salvador) TBD
Atletico Zapotitan	19	(El Salvador) TBD	(El Salvador) TBD
Venus	19	(El Salvador) TBD, TBD	(El Salvador) TBD

==== Group 2 ====
Team name	Founded	Hometown	Coaches
Atapasco	19	(El Salvador) TBD, TBD	(El Salvador) TBD
C.D. Libertad	19	(El Salvador) TBD	(El Salvador) TBD
Santa Rosa	19	(El Salvador) TBD, TBD	(El Salvador) TBD
Quezaltepeque	19	(El Salvador) TBD	(El Salvador) TBD
Combinado	19	(El Salvador) TBD, TBD	(El Salvador) TBD
La Cruz	19	(El Salvador) TBD, TBD	(El Salvador) TBD
Falcon	19	(El Salvador) TBD	(El Salvador) TBD
Tehuicho	19	(El Salvador) TBD, TBD	(El Salvador) TBD
F.C. Zapotitan	19	(El Salvador) TBD	(El Salvador) TBD
Toros Rojas	19	(El Salvador) TBD, TBD	(El Salvador) TBD
Las Victorias	19	(El Salvador) TBD	(El Salvador) TBD
Juventud Independiente	19	(El Salvador) TBD, TBD	(El Salvador) TBD

==== Group 3 ====
Team name	Founded	Hometown	Coaches
Granadillas	19	(El Salvador) TBD, TBD	(El Salvador) TBD
Atlas	19	(El Salvador) TBD	(El Salvador) TBD
Atletico Belen	19	(El Salvador) TBD, TBD	(El Salvador) TBD
Belen Jr.	19	(El Salvador) TBD	(El Salvador) TBD
Primavera	19	(El Salvador) TBD, TBD	(El Salvador) TBD
C.D. Cadiz	19	(El Salvador) TBD, TBD	(El Salvador) TBD
X9	19	(El Salvador) TBD	(El Salvador) TBD
X9 Jr	19	(El Salvador) TBD, TBD	(El Salvador) TBD
Nuevositio	19	(El Salvador) TBD	(El Salvador) TBD
Union	19	(El Salvador) TBD, TBD	(El Salvador) TBD
Saprisa	19	(El Salvador) TBD	(El Salvador) TBD
Racing	19	(El Salvador) TBD, TBD	(El Salvador) TBD

==== Group 4 ====
Team name	Founded	Hometown	Coaches
Aruba F.C.	19	(El Salvador) Curazao, Jayaque, La Libertad	(El Salvador) Alexis Urbina
Cadiz F.C.	19	(El Salvador) TBD	(El Salvador) TBD
Curazo	19	(El Salvador) TBD, TBD	(El Salvador) TBD
Inter	19	(El Salvador) Colonia Dos de Mayo, Jayaque	(El Salvador) TBD
11 Robles	19	(El Salvador) TBD, TBD	(El Salvador) TBD
El Palmarato	19	(El Salvador) TBD, TBD	(El Salvador) TBD
Atletico Libertad	19	(El Salvador) TBD	(El Salvador) TBD
San Luis	19	(El Salvador) TBD, TBD	(El Salvador) TBD
Fuerte Lourdense	19	(El Salvador) TBD	(El Salvador) TBD
Capitanas	19	(El Salvador) TBD, TBD	(El Salvador) TBD
Jardines	19	(El Salvador) TBD, TBD	(El Salvador) TBD

=== Asociaciones Departamentales de Fútbol Aficionado (ADFA) - San Vicente ===
==== Group 1 ====
Team name	Founded	Hometown	Coaches
C.D. Vendaval	1967	(El Salvador) San Juan de Merino, San Vicente Department	(El Salvador) TBD
San Francisco	19	(El Salvador) TBD, TBD	(El Salvador) TBD
Inter Santo Domingo	19	(El Salvador) TBD, TBD	(El Salvador) TBD
Atletico Jiboa	19	(El Salvador) TBD, TBD	(El Salvador) TBD
Juventud Bataneca	2009	(El Salvador) San Sebastian, San Vicente Department	(El Salvador) TBD
C.D. Candelaria Arriba	19	(El Salvador) TBD, TBD	(El Salvador) TBD
Tehuacan	1928	(El Salvador) Tecoluca, San Vicente Department	(El Salvador) TBD
A.D. Santa Clara	19	(El Salvador) TBD, TBD	(El Salvador) TBD
Real San Esteban	19	(El Salvador) TBD, TBD	(El Salvador) TBD
Escuela de Futbol Agua Caliente	19	(El Salvador) TBD, TBD	(El Salvador) TBD
Antepet	19	(El Salvador) TBD, TBD	(El Salvador) TBD

=== Asociaciones Departamentales de Fútbol Aficionado (ADFA) - Santa Ana ===
C.D El Cerron, CD Guiaja, CD Santiagueňo, Guadalupano, CD San Martin, Sporting Club, Genius Soccer Academia

==== Group 1 ====
Team name	Founded	Hometown	Coaches
Santiagueno F.C.	19	(El Salvador) TBD	(El Salvador) TBD
C.D. San Jose Jr	1972	(El Salvador) TBD, TBD	(El Salvador) TBD
Congolese F.C.	19	(El Salvador) TBD, TBD	(El Salvador) TBD
C.D. Atletico San Antonio	19	(El Salvador) TBD, TBD	(El Salvador) TBD
ADEFMO Academia de Fútbol	2008	(El Salvador) TBD, TBD	(El Salvador) TBD
Atletico Bolanos	2020	(El Salvador) TBD, TBD	(El Salvador) TBD
AF Salguero	19	(El Salvador) TBD, TBD	(El Salvador) TBD
Linaje Real	19	(El Salvador) TBD, TBD	(El Salvador) TBD
Fuerte San Sebastian	19	(El Salvador) TBD, TBD	(El Salvador) TBD
Malacoff	19	(El Salvador) TBD, TBD	(El Salvador) TBD

=== Asociaciones Departamentales de Fútbol Aficionado (ADFA) - La Paz ===
==== Group 1 ====
Team name	Founded	Hometown	Coaches
Orion	19	(El Salvador) TBD, TBD	(El Salvador) TBD
Tehuacan	19	(El Salvador) TBD, TBD	(El Salvador) TBD
Hacienda Vieja	19	(El Salvador) TBD	(El Salvador) TBD
Fuerte Veracruz	19	(El Salvador) TBD, TBD	(El Salvador) TBD
La Bonaza	19	(El Salvador) TBD	(El Salvador) TBD
Vaquerano	19	(El Salvador) TBD, TBD	(El Salvador) TBD
Venados del Playos	19	(El Salvador) TBD	(El Salvador) TBD
San Cristobal	19	(El Salvador) TBD, TBD	(El Salvador) TBD
Vencedor Jr	19	(El Salvador) TBD	(El Salvador) TBD
San Marcos	19	(El Salvador) TBD, TBD	(El Salvador) TBD
Juventud la Pedrera	19	(El Salvador) TBD	(El Salvador) TBD

==== Group 2 ====
Team name	Founded	Hometown	Coaches
Monterrey	19	(El Salvador) TBD, TBD	(El Salvador) TBD
S/ Carlos La Magdalena	19	(El Salvador) TBD	(El Salvador) TBD
Atletico Vencedor	19	(El Salvador) TBD, TBD	(El Salvador) TBD
Atlantico	19	(El Salvador) TBD	(El Salvador) TBD
FC Rio Blanco	19	(El Salvador) TBD, TBD	(El Salvador) TBD
Torino Jr	19	(El Salvador) TBD, TBD	(El Salvador) TBD
Relempago	19	(El Salvador) TBD	(El Salvador) TBD
Real Valldolid	19	(El Salvador) TBD, TBD	(El Salvador) TBD
Nuevo Renacimiento	19	(El Salvador) TBD	(El Salvador) TBD
Ajax	19	(El Salvador) TBD	(El Salvador) TBD

==== Group 3 ====
Team name	Founded	Hometown	Coaches
La Palma	19	(El Salvador) TBD	(El Salvador) TBD
San Josecita	19	(El Salvador) TBD	(El Salvador) TBD
Nuevo Renac el Cocal	19	(El Salvador) TBD, TBD	(El Salvador) TBD
Vencedor SPM	19	(El Salvador) TBD, TBD	(El Salvador) TBD
A.D. Las Garzas	19	(El Salvador) TBD	(El Salvador) TBD
Anabella	19	(El Salvador) TBD, TBD	(El Salvador) TBD
Teleton F.C.	19	(El Salvador) TBD, TBD	(El Salvador) TBD
Pacifico O Pal Blanco	19	(El Salvador) TBD	(El Salvador) TBD
Nuevo Escntlo FC	19	(El Salvador) TBD, TBD	(El Salvador) TBD
Maracana San Rafael	1998	(El Salvador) San Rafael Obrajuelo, La Paz	(El Salvador) TBDv

==== Group 4 ====
Team name	Founded	Hometown	Coaches
Fuerte San Jose	19	(El Salvador) TBD, TBD	(El Salvador) TBD
Golden F.C.	19	(El Salvador) TBD	(El Salvador) TBD
Monterrey Jr	19	(El Salvador) TBD, TBD	(El Salvador) TBD
Everest	19	(El Salvador) TBD, TBD	(El Salvador) TBD
Huracan Jr	19	(El Salvador) TBD	(El Salvador) TBD
Deportivo San Teresa	19	(El Salvador) TBD, TBD	(El Salvador) TBD
Rosarence F.C.	19	(El Salvador) TBD, TBD	(El Salvador) TBD
Nonualco F.C.	19	(El Salvador) TBD, TBD	(El Salvador) TBD
Alacran	19	(El Salvador) TBD	(El Salvador) TBD
El Progreso	19	(El Salvador) TBD	(El Salvador) TBD
Nahualapa F.C.	19	(El Salvador) TBD, TBD	(El Salvador) TBD

==== Group 5 ====
Team name	Founded	Hometown	Coaches
Sampdoria	19	(El Salvador) TBD, TBD	(El Salvador) TBD
JLH	19	(El Salvador) TBD, TBD	(El Salvador) TBD
Earthquakes City	19	(El Salvador) TBD	(El Salvador) TBD
San Josecl Pedregal	19	(El Salvador) TBD, TBD	(El Salvador) TBD
Nuevo Renacar	19	(El Salvador) TBD, TBD	(El Salvador) TBD
Santa Cruz Rip	19	(El Salvador) TBD	(El Salvador) TBD
Santa Rita	19	(El Salvador) TBD, TBD	(El Salvador) TBD
Cauca	19	(El Salvador) TBD, TBD	(El Salvador) TBD
Aspirantes	19	(El Salvador) TBD, TBD	(El Salvador) TBD
F.C. Abias	19	(El Salvador) TBD	(El Salvador) TBD

==== Group 6 ====
Team name	Founded	Hometown	Coaches
El Cocal F.C.	19	(El Salvador) TBD, TBD	(El Salvador) TBD
San Marcelino F.C.	19	(El Salvador) TBD, TBD	(El Salvador) TBD
Azul Y Blanco	19	(El Salvador) TBD	(El Salvador) TBD
Bucaneros	19	(El Salvador) TBD, TBD	(El Salvador) TBD
Santa Emilia F.C.	19	(El Salvador) TBD, TBD	(El Salvador) TBD
Veracruz	19	(El Salvador) TBD	(El Salvador) TBD
Aguilas Marinas	19	(El Salvador) TBD, TBD	(El Salvador) TBD
Juventud Isleteno	19	(El Salvador) TBD	(El Salvador) TBD
A.D. La Herradura	19	(El Salvador) TBD, TBD	(El Salvador) TBD
Aguila Marinas	19	(El Salvador) TBD	(El Salvador) TBD
Guadalupano	19	(El Salvador) TBD	(El Salvador) TBD
Palmeira	19	(El Salvador) TBD, TBD	(El Salvador) TBD

==== Group 7 ====
Team name	Founded	Hometown	Coaches
A.D. Valle Nuevo	19	(El Salvador) TBD, TBD	(El Salvador) TBD
Melara F.C.	19	(El Salvador) TBD, TBD	(El Salvador) TBD
Atlas Jr	19	(El Salvador) TBD, TBD	(El Salvador) TBD
Fuerte Juvenil	19	(El Salvador) TBD	(El Salvador) TBD
Atletico Santo Tomas	19	(El Salvador) TBD, TBD	(El Salvador) TBD
Cruzeiro	19	(El Salvador) TBD	(El Salvador) TBD
Los Angeles	19	(El Salvador) TBD	(El Salvador) TBD
Juventud San Jose	19	(El Salvador) TBD	(El Salvador) TBD
Pumas del Jiboa	19	(El Salvador) TBD, TBD	(El Salvador) TBD
Heroes Azules F.C.	19	(El Salvador) TBD	(El Salvador) TBD
Halcones el Aciotel	19	(El Salvador) TBD, TBD	(El Salvador) TBD

=== Asociaciones Departamentales de Fútbol Aficionado (ADFA) - La Unión ===
(CD Pumas, Simon bolívar)

==== Group 1 ====
Team name	Founded	Hometown	Coaches
C.D. Maraton	19	(El Salvador) TBD, TBD	(El Salvador) TBD
Sport Gym	19	(El Salvador) TBD	(El Salvador) TBD
Perla Juvenil F.C.	19	(El Salvador) TBD, TBD	(El Salvador) TBD
C.D. Estaquero	1980	(El Salvador) Santa rosa de lima, Col. Turcios TBD	(El Salvador) TBD
America Corrales	19	(El Salvador) TBD, TBD	(El Salvador) TBD
Monterrey F.C.	19	(El Salvador) TBD, TBD	(El Salvador) TBD
Atletico Holandes F.C.	19	(El Salvador) TBD	(El Salvador) TBD
C.D. San Juday	19	(El Salvador) TBD, TBD	(El Salvador) TBD
CD Estrellas	19	(El Salvador) TBD	(El Salvador) TBD

==== Group 2 ====
Team name	Founded	Hometown	Coaches
CD Aguila Federal	19	(El Salvador) TBD, TBD	(El Salvador) TBD
C.D. Pumas	19	(El Salvador) TBD	(El Salvador) TBD
C.D. Esterella Roja	19	(El Salvador) TBD, TBD	(El Salvador) TBD
C.D. Huracan Bohemio	19	(El Salvador) Canton Hato Nuevo, La Unión	(El Salvador) TBD
CD Piedras Blancas	19	(El Salvador) TBD, TBD	(El Salvador) TBD
C.D. El Rey	19	(El Salvador) TBD, TBD	(El Salvador) TBD
C.D. Santa Clarita	19	(El Salvador) TBD	(El Salvador) TBD
Barrio Fino F.C.	19	(El Salvador) TBD, TBD	(El Salvador) TBD
C.D. Simon Bolivar	19	(El Salvador) TBD	(El Salvador) TBD
C.D. La Paz	19	(El Salvador) TBD, TBD	(El Salvador) TBD

==== Group 3 ====
Team name	Founded	Hometown	Coaches
C.D. Ancla de Oro	1963	(El Salvador) TBD, TBD	(El Salvador) TBD
C.D. Huisquill	19	(El Salvador) TBD	(El Salvador) TBD
C.D. Wilber Alexis	1980	(El Salvador) TBD, TBD	(El Salvador) TBD
Sal Y Mar F.C.	19	(El Salvador) TBD	(El Salvador) TBD
Amatitlan F.C.	19	(El Salvador) TBD, TBD	(El Salvador) TBD
Atletico Conchagua	19	(El Salvador) TBD, TBD	(El Salvador) TBD
Gerardo Barrios	19	(El Salvador) TBD	(El Salvador) TBD
Brisaside Mar F.C.	19	(El Salvador) TBD, TBD	(El Salvador) TBD
C.D. Atletico Guzman	19	(El Salvador) TBD	(El Salvador) TBD
Fuerte San Francisco	19	(El Salvador) TBD, TBD	(El Salvador) TBD

=== Asociaciones Departamentales de Fútbol Aficionado (ADFA) - Ahuachapán ===
==== Group 1 ====
Team name	Founded	Hometown	Coaches
F.C. Victoria	19	(El Salvador) TBD, TBD	(El Salvador) TBD
San Jose F.C.	19	(El Salvador) TBD, TBD	(El Salvador) TBD
EF Apaneca	19	(El Salvador) TBD, TBD	(El Salvador) TBD
AD Apaneca	19	(El Salvador) TBD, TBD	(El Salvador) TBD
Alianza La Labor	19	(El Salvador) TBD, TBD	(El Salvador) TBD
Santa Rita F.C.	19	(El Salvador) TBD	(El Salvador) TBD
Desert F.C.	19	(El Salvador) TBD, TBD	(El Salvador) TBD
C.D. Vencedor	19	(El Salvador) TBD	(El Salvador) TBD
RL Soccer Academy	19	(El Salvador) TBD, TBD	(El Salvador) TBD

==== Group 2 ====
Team name	Founded	Hometown	Coaches
Huracan	19	(El Salvador) TBD	(El Salvador) TBD
C.D. America	19	(El Salvador) TBD	(El Salvador) TBD
Juventud Palo Pique	19	(El Salvador) TBD	(El Salvador) TBD
Juventud F.C.	19	(El Salvador) TBD	(El Salvador) TBD
CD La Coruna	19	(El Salvador) TBD, TBD	(El Salvador) TBD
Promesas F.C.	19	(El Salvador) TBD, TBD	(El Salvador) TBD
EF San Rafael	19	(El Salvador) TBD	(El Salvador) TBD
El Vendabal	19	(El Salvador) TBD, TBD	(El Salvador) TBD

=== Asociaciones Departamentales de Fútbol Aficionado (ADFA) - Cabañas ===
==== Group 1 ====
Team name	Founded	Hometown	Coaches
C.D. San Nicolas	19	(El Salvador) TBD, TBD	(El Salvador) TBD
El Roble de Ilobasco (Reserves)	19	(El Salvador) TBD	(El Salvador) TBD
C.D. Empalme	19	(El Salvador) TBD, TBD	(El Salvador) TBD
Tejutepeque F.C.	19	(El Salvador) TBD	(El Salvador) TBD
C.D. Puebla	19	(El Salvador) TBD, TBD	(El Salvador) TBD
C.D. El Playon	19	(El Salvador) TBD, TBD	(El Salvador) TBD
INS F.C.	19	(El Salvador) TBD	(El Salvador) TBD
Sensunte Cabanas F.C. (Reserves)	19	(El Salvador) TBD, TBD	(El Salvador) TBD
C.D. San Isidro	19	(El Salvador) TBD	(El Salvador) TBD
C.D. Perla	19	(El Salvador) TBD, TBD	(El Salvador) TBD

=== Asociaciones Departamentales de Fútbol Aficionado (ADFA) - Chalatenango ===
==== Group 1 ====
Team name	Founded	Hometown	Coaches
C.D. Zeus	1976	(El Salvador) La Reina, Chalatenango	(El Salvador) TBD
C.D. El Gramal	19	(El Salvador) TBD, TBD	(El Salvador) TBD
C.D. El Transito	19	(El Salvador) TBD	(El Salvador) David Rivera
C.D. Las Pilas	19	(El Salvador) TBD	(El Salvador) TBD
C.D. La Palma	19	(El Salvador) TBD, TBD	(El Salvador) TBD
A.D. Salitre	19	(El Salvador) TBD, TBD	(El Salvador) TBD
C.D. Concepion	19	(El Salvador) TBD, TBD	(El Salvador) TBD
C.D. El Tigre	19	(El Salvador) TBD, TBD	(El Salvador) TBD
C.D. Montecristo	1940	(El Salvador) Citalá, Chalatenango	(El Salvador) TBD
EMF La Reina	19	(El Salvador) TBD	(El Salvador) TBD
C.D. San Ignacio	19	(El Salvador) San Ignacio, Chalatenango	(El Salvador) TBD

==== Group 2 ====
Team name	Founded	Hometown	Coaches
C.D. Saprissa	19	(El Salvador) TBD, TBD	(El Salvador) TBD
C.D. Santa Rita	19	(El Salvador) TBD	(El Salvador) TBD
Fuerte Agua Caliente	19	(El Salvador) TBD, TBD	(El Salvador) TBD
C.D. La Angostura	19	(El Salvador) TBD, TBD	(El Salvador) TBD
Fuertes San Isidro	19	(El Salvador) TBD	(El Salvador) TBD
C.D. Morazan	19	(El Salvador) TBD	(El Salvador) TBD
San Juan Colima	19	(El Salvador) TBD, TBD	(El Salvador) TBD
C.D. Aldeita	19	(El Salvador) TBD, TBD	(El Salvador) TBD
C.D. Calle Nueva	19	(El Salvador) TBD	(El Salvador) TBD
FC El Paraiso	19	(El Salvador) TBD, TBD	(El Salvador) TBD
Fuerte San Antonio	19	(El Salvador) TBD, TBD	(El Salvador) TBD

==== Group 3 ====
Team name	Founded	Hometown	Coaches
C.D. Juventus	19	(El Salvador) TBD, TBD	(El Salvador) TBD
C.D. Leones	19	(El Salvador) TBD	(El Salvador) TBD
Once Halcones	19	(El Salvador) TBD, TBD	(El Salvador) TBD
C.D. Candelaria	19	(El Salvador) TBD, TBD	(El Salvador) TBD
EF Los Ranchos	19	(El Salvador) TBD	(El Salvador) TBD
Nueva Juventud El Paraiso	2016	(El Salvador) TBD, TBD	(El Salvador) TBD
CD Leones El Morro	19	(El Salvador) TBD, TBD	(El Salvador) TBD
Atletico Dulce Nombre	2016	(El Salvador) TBD	(El Salvador) TBD
CD Ignacio Ellacuria	19	(El Salvador) TBD, TBD	(El Salvador) TBD
Nueva Concepion	19	(El Salvador) TBD	(El Salvador) TBD
C.D. Quezalteco	19	(El Salvador) TBD, TBD	(El Salvador) TBD

=== Asociaciones Departamentales de Fútbol Aficionado (ADFA) - Cuscatlán ===
==== Group 1 ====
Team name	Founded	Hometown	Coaches
Escuela de Futbol San Jose Guayabal	19	(El Salvador) TBD, TBD	(El Salvador) TBD
ADFA Cuscatlan	19	(El Salvador) TBD	(El Salvador) TBD
Brasilia F.C.	19	(El Salvador) TBD	(El Salvador) TBD
Academia de Talentos Tenancingo	19	(El Salvador) TBD	(El Salvador) TBD
Academia Integral de Futbol Simon Vasquez Cojute-LA	19	(El Salvador) TBD	(El Salvador) TBD

== Current ADFA Champions 2025-2026 ==
Club	Department	Current Division
F.C. Juventud Palo Pique (*)	Ahuachapan	Centro Occidente
Club Deportivo Congoles (*)	Santa Ana	Centro Occidente
F.C. Surf City (*)	Sonsonate	Centro Occidente
CD Curazao (*)	La Libertad	Centro Occidente
Academia de Talentos Tenancingo (*)	Cuscatlan	Centro Central
FC San Francisco (*)	San Vincente	Centro Central
C.D. El Tránsito (*)	Chalatenango	Centro Central
CD Talleres Soyapango (*)	San Salvador	Centro Central
A.D Academia Integral de Futbol El Pino (*)	La Paz	Centro Central
No Champion	Cabanas	Centro Central
Orion FC (*)	Usulutan	Centro Oriente
Bangu FC (*)	San Miguel	Centro Oriente
C.D. Atletico Juvenil Lolotiquillo (*)	Morazon	Centro Oriente
C.D. Halcón Isla Conchaguita (*)	La Union	Centro Oriente

== Former teams ==
List of any teams that previously played in ADFAS but currently not playing or registered in ADFAS or any other division in El Salvador football tier.

List as of April 2026

Team name	Founded	Hometown	Last year competed in ADFA
Atletico Juvenil	19	(El Salvador) TBD, TBD	(El Salvador) ADFA Morazan
Atletico San Simon	19	(El Salvador) TBD, TBD	(El Salvador) ADFA Morazan
Corinto	19	(El Salvador) TBD, TBD	(El Salvador) ADFA Morazan
Delicias F.C.	19	(El Salvador) TBD, TBD	(El Salvador) ADFA Morazan
C.D Villa San Carlos	19	(El Salvador) TBD, TBD	(El Salvador) ADFA Morazan
Real Sociedad	19	(El Salvador) TBD, TBD	(El Salvador) ADFA Morazan
Pipil	19	(El Salvador) TBD, TBD	(El Salvador) ADFA Morazan
San Francisco Coroban	19	(El Salvador) TBD, TBD	(El Salvador) ADFA Morazan
EMF Villa El Rosario	19	(El Salvador) TBD, TBD	(El Salvador) ADFA Morazan 2023
Quebrachos F.C.	19	(El Salvador) TBD, TBD	(El Salvador) ADFA Morazan 2023
San Fernando F.C.	19	(El Salvador) TBD, TBD	(El Salvador) ADFA Morazan 2023
C.D. Atletico Perquin	19	(El Salvador) TBD, TBD	(El Salvador) ADFA Morazan 2023
Delicias F.C.	19	(El Salvador) TBD, TBD	(El Salvador) ADFA Morazan 2023
Real Independiente	19	(El Salvador) TBD, TBD	(El Salvador) ADFA Morazan 2023
Las Flores F.C.	19	(El Salvador) TBD, TBD	(El Salvador) ADFA Morazan 2023
Turin F.C.	19	(El Salvador) TBD, TBD	(El Salvador) ADFA Ahuachapan 2023
Escuela de Futbol F.C. San Lazaro	19	(El Salvador) TBD, TBD	(El Salvador) ADFA Ahuachapan 2023
Esfumjubas	19	(El Salvador) TBD, TBD	(El Salvador) ADFA Ahuachapan 2023
Guayapa F.C.	19	(El Salvador) TBD, TBD	(El Salvador) ADFA Ahuachapan 2023
FC San Miguelito	19	(El Salvador) TBD, TBD	(El Salvador) ADFA Ahuachapan 2023
El Quebracho	19	(El Salvador) TBD, TBD	(El Salvador) ADFA Ahuachapan 2023
Academia NB	19	(El Salvador) TBD, TBD	(El Salvador) ADFA Ahuachapan 2023
Destroyer FC Arcatao	19	(El Salvador) TBD, TBD	(El Salvador) ADFA Ahuachapan
Nueva Trinidad	19	(El Salvador) TBD, TBD	(El Salvador) ADFA Ahuachapan
CD Porteño	19	(El Salvador) TBD, TBD	(El Salvador) ADFA Ahuachapan
C.D. Simon Bolivar	2016	(El Salvador) La Union Bolivar	(El Salvador) ADFA La Union 2019
C.D . Boston Aguila Obrajuelo	19	(El Salvador) Obrajuelo, San Miguel	(El Salvador) ADFA San Miguel 2021
América Central	19	(El Salvador) TBD, TBD	(El Salvador) ADFA San Miguel
C.D Belén Santa Emilia	19	(El Salvador) TBD, TBD	(El Salvador) ADFA San Miguel
C.D La Paz	19	(El Salvador) TBD, TBD	(El Salvador) ADFA San Miguel
C.D Olímpico	19	(El Salvador) TBD, TBD	(El Salvador) ADFA San Miguel
C.D San Jose	19	(El Salvador) TBD, TBD	(El Salvador) ADFA San Miguel
[Real Mayorca	19	(El Salvador) TBD, TBD	(El Salvador) ADFA San Miguel
C.D 11 Lobos	19	(El Salvador) TBD, TBD	(El Salvador) ADFA San Miguel
Zapriva Jr	19	(El Salvador) TBD, TBD	(El Salvador) ADFA San Miguel
Placita Juvenil	19	(El Salvador) TBD, TBD	(El Salvador) ADFA San Miguel
C.D Alianza Juvenil	19	(El Salvador) TBD, TBD	(El Salvador) ADFA San Miguel
Zaprivas F.C.	19	(El Salvador) TBD, TBD	(El Salvador) ADFA San Miguel 2023
Atletico Espina	19	(El Salvador) TBD, TBD	(El Salvador) ADFA San Miguel 2023
C.D. Marlene	19	(El Salvador) TBD, TBD	(El Salvador) ADFA San Miguel 2023
C.D. Aguila Juvenil de Cofradia	19	(El Salvador) TBD, TBD	(El Salvador) ADFA San Miguel 2023
C.D. Juventud Olimpica	19	(El Salvador) TBD, TBD	(El Salvador) ADFA San Miguel 2023
C.D. Once Juvenil	19	(El Salvador) TBD, TBD	(El Salvador) ADFA San Miguel 2023
C.D. Once Oriental	19	(El Salvador) TBD, TBD	(El Salvador) ADFA San Miguel 2023
Escuela de Futbol C.D. Uluazapense	19	(El Salvador) TBD, TBD	(El Salvador) ADFA San Miguel 2023
Junior San Pablo F.C.	19	(El Salvador) TBD, TBD	(El Salvador) ADFA San Miguel 2023
C.D. Atletico Juvenil	19	(El Salvador) TBD, TBD	(El Salvador) ADFA San Miguel 2023
C.D. Sporting El Nino	19	(El Salvador) TBD, TBD	(El Salvador) ADFA San Miguel 2023
C.D. Fuerte San Antonio	19	(El Salvador) TBD, TBD	(El Salvador) ADFA San Miguel 2023
Club Deportivo Atletico Moralense	19	(El Salvador) TBD, TBD	(El Salvador) ADFA San Miguel 2023
Brasil FC	19	(El Salvador) TBD, TBD	(El Salvador) ADFA San Miguel 2023
Cruzeiro	19	(El Salvador) TBD, TBD	(El Salvador) ADFA San Miguel 2023
Real Tierra Blanca	19	(El Salvador) TBD, TBD	(El Salvador) ADFA San Miguel 2023
C.D. Rica Mar El Cuco	19	(El Salvador) TBD, TBD	(El Salvador) ADFA San Miguel 2023
Kubala F.C.	19	(El Salvador) TBD, TBD	(El Salvador) ADFA Usulutan 2021
Once Berlines	1921	(El Salvador) Berlín, Usulután	(El Salvador) ADFA Usulutan 2022
España F.C. (Usulután)	1957	(El Salvador) San Buenaventura, Usulután	(El Salvador) ADFA Usulutan 2019
C.D. Halcon Negro	19	(El Salvador) TBD, TBD	(El Salvador) ADFA Usulutan 2023
C.D. La Flores	19	(El Salvador) TBD, TBD	(El Salvador) ADFA Usulutan 2023
C.D. Huracan Marino	19	(El Salvador) TBD, TBD	(El Salvador) ADFA Usulutan 2023
C.D. Pumas	19	(El Salvador) TBD, TBD	(El Salvador) ADFA Usulutan 2023
C.D. Federal	19	(El Salvador) TBD, TBD	(El Salvador) ADFA Usulutan 2023
C.D. Balboa	19	(El Salvador) TBD, TBD	(El Salvador) ADFA Usulutan 2023
C.D. Tigre	19	(El Salvador) TBD, TBD	(El Salvador) ADFA Usulutan 2023
C.D. Coscafe	19	(El Salvador) TBD, TBD	(El Salvador) ADFA Usulutan 2023
ADET	19	(El Salvador) TBD, TBD	(El Salvador) ADFA Usulutan 2023
C.D. Carrizal	19	(El Salvador) TBD, TBD	(El Salvador) ADFA Usulutan 2023
C.D. Diablos Rojos	19	(El Salvador) TBD, TBD	(El Salvador) ADFA Usulutan 2023
C.D. Colibri	19	(El Salvador) TBD, TBD	(El Salvador) ADFA Usulutan 2023
C.D. Bilbao	19	(El Salvador) TBD, TBD	(El Salvador) ADFA Usulutan 2023
C.D. 11 Estrellas Hornos	19	(El Salvador) TBD, TBD	(El Salvador) ADFA Usulutan 2023
Puerto El Triunfo	19	(El Salvador) TBD, TBD	(El Salvador) ADFA Usulutan 2023
A.C. Milan San Francisco J	19	(El Salvador) TBD, TBD	(El Salvador) ADFA Usulutan 2023
Baye de San Juan	19	(El Salvador) TBD, TBD	(El Salvador) ADFA Usulutan 2023
C.D. Cadiz Jiquilisco	19	(El Salvador) TBD, TBD	(El Salvador) ADFA Usulutan 2023
Relampago Marino	19	(El Salvador) TBD, TBD	(El Salvador) ADFA Usulutan 2023
C.D. San Hilario	19	(El Salvador) TBD, TBD	(El Salvador) ADFA Usulutan 2023
C.D. La Costa	19	(El Salvador) TBD, TBD	(El Salvador) ADFA Usulutan 2023
C.D. Ciudad Romero	19	(El Salvador) TBD, TBD	(El Salvador) ADFA Usulutan 2023
Milan F.C.	19	(El Salvador) TBD, TBD	(El Salvador) ADFA Usulutan 2023
San Marcos Lempa	19	(El Salvador) TBD, TBD	(El Salvador) ADFA Usulutan 2023
C.D. Estanzuelence	19	(El Salvador) TBD, TBD	(El Salvador) ADFA Usulutan 2023
C.D. El Palmital	19	(El Salvador) TBD, TBD	(El Salvador) ADFA Usulutan 2023
C.D. San Jorge Ozatlan	19	(El Salvador) TBD, TBD	(El Salvador) ADFA Usulutan 2023
C.D. FAS Oriental Canton La Pena	19	(El Salvador) TBD, TBD	(El Salvador) ADFA Usulutan 2023
C.D Peñarol	19	(El Salvador) TBD, TBD	(El Salvador) ADFA Usulutan
C.D Nuevo Imperial	19	(El Salvador) TBD, TBD	(El Salvador) ADFA Usulutan
CD San Josecito	19	(El Salvador) TBD, TBD	(El Salvador) ADFA La Paz 2020
Cangrejera FC	19	(El Salvador) TBD, TBD	(El Salvador) ADFA La Paz
Atletico San Juan	19	(El Salvador) TBD, TBD	(El Salvador) ADFA La Paz
Valencia FC	19	(El Salvador) TBD, TBD	(El Salvador) ADFA La Paz
FC Estrella Roja	19	(El Salvador) TBD, TBD	(El Salvador) ADFA La Paz
Atlético Nahualapa	19	(El Salvador) TBD, TBD	(El Salvador) ADFA La Paz
Vencedor (Santa Rita)	19	(El Salvador) TBD, TBD	(El Salvador) ADFA La Paz
San Luis	19	(El Salvador) TBD, TBD	(El Salvador) ADFA La Paz
Neo Pipil	19	(El Salvador) TBD, TBD	(El Salvador) ADFA La Paz
Zacatecoluca FC	19	(El Salvador) TBD, TBD	(El Salvador) ADFA La Paz
A.D. El Espino	19	(El Salvador) TBD, TBD	(El Salvador) ADFA La Paz
Atlas F.C.	19	(El Salvador) TBD, TBD	(El Salvador) ADFA La Paz
La Palma	19	(El Salvador) TBD, TBD	(El Salvador) ADFA La Paz
UDEM	19	(El Salvador) TBD, TBD	(El Salvador) ADFA La Paz
Monterrey JR	19	(El Salvador) TBD, TBD	(El Salvador) ADFA La Paz
CD Lombardia	19	(El Salvador) TBD, TBD	(El Salvador) ADFA La Paz
CD San Marcos	19	(El Salvador) TBD, TBD	(El Salvador) ADFA La Paz
Juventud Escuintla	19	(El Salvador) TBD, TBD	(El Salvador) ADFA La Paz
Combardia	19	(El Salvador) TBD, TBD	(El Salvador) ADFA La Paz 2023
San Cristobal Jr	19	(El Salvador) TBD, TBD	(El Salvador) ADFA La Paz 2023
Sporting La Galaxi	19	(El Salvador) TBD, TBD	(El Salvador) ADFA La Paz 2023
San Antonio las Tablas	19	(El Salvador) TBD, TBD	(El Salvador) ADFA La Paz 2023
Atletico San Josecito	19	(El Salvador) TBD, TBD	(El Salvador) ADFA La Paz 2023
Bilbao	19	(El Salvador) TBD, TBD	(El Salvador) ADFA La Paz 2023
Estrella Roja	19	(El Salvador) TBD, TBD	(El Salvador) ADFA La Paz 2023
Juvenil Universal	19	(El Salvador) TBD, TBD	(El Salvador) ADFA La Paz 2023
11 Agricultares	19	(El Salvador) TBD, TBD	(El Salvador) ADFA La Paz 2023
Nuevo San Juan	19	(El Salvador) TBD, TBD	(El Salvador) ADFA La Paz 2023
Riveras del Mar	19	(El Salvador) TBD, TBD	(El Salvador) ADFA La Paz 2023
Imber	19	(El Salvador) TBD, TBD	(El Salvador) ADFA La Paz 2023
Talpa F.C.	19	(El Salvador) TBD, TBD	(El Salvador) ADFA La Paz 2023
El Piro	19	(El Salvador) TBD, TBD	(El Salvador) ADFA La Paz 2023
D A K	19	(El Salvador) TBD, TBD	(El Salvador) ADFA San Salvador 2023
C.D. La Cabana	19	(El Salvador) TBD, TBD	(El Salvador) ADFA San Salvador 2023
C.D. Huracan	19	(El Salvador) TBD, TBD	(El Salvador) ADFA San Salvador 2023
El Llano	19	(El Salvador) TBD, TBD	(El Salvador) ADFA San Salvador 2023
Atletico San Nicolas	19	(El Salvador) TBD, TBD	(El Salvador) ADFA San Salvador 2023
Vendaval Apopa Reserva	19	(El Salvador) TBD, TBD	(El Salvador) ADFA San Salvador 2023
El Llano	19	(El Salvador) TBD, TBD	(El Salvador) ADFA San Salvador 2023
San Critobal F.C.	19	(El Salvador) TBD, TBD	(El Salvador) ADFA San Salvador 2023
Tutultepeque	19	(El Salvador) TBD, TBD	(El Salvador) ADFA San Salvador 2023
La Academia BP	19	(El Salvador) TBD, TBD	(El Salvador) ADFA San Salvador 2023
F.C. Lourdes	19	(El Salvador) TBD, TBD	(El Salvador) ADFA San Salvador 2023
F.C. Las Aguilas de Sur	19	(El Salvador) TBD, TBD	(El Salvador) ADFA San Salvador 2023
El Tigre Y Sus Amigos	19	(El Salvador) TBD, TBD	(El Salvador) ADFA San Salvador 2023
Canonazos	19	(El Salvador) TBD, TBD	(El Salvador) ADFA San Salvador 2023
Sierra Morena	19	(El Salvador) TBD, TBD	(El Salvador) ADFA San Salvador
Escuela de futbol El Angel	19	(El Salvador) TBD, TBD	(El Salvador) ADFA San Salvador
Genios Del Balon FC	19	(El Salvador) TBD, TBD	(El Salvador) ADFA San Salvador
FC Victoria	19	(El Salvador) TBD, TBD	(El Salvador) ADFA Chalatenango
Talleres Jr	19	(El Salvador) TBD, TBD	(El Salvador) ADFA Chalatenango
Sta Barbara H.	19	(El Salvador) TBD, TBD	(El Salvador) ADFA Chalatenango
Ases de Monte Rey	19	(El Salvador) TBD, TBD	(El Salvador) ADFA Chalatenango
Escuela Municipal Santa Rita	19	(El Salvador) TBD, TBD	(El Salvador) ADFA Chalatenango
Leones FC	19	(El Salvador) TBD, TBD	(El Salvador) ADFA Chalatenango
Los Ranchos	19	(El Salvador) TBD, TBD	(El Salvador) ADFA Chalatenango
C.D. Titanes	19	(El Salvador) TBD, TBD	(El Salvador) ADFA Chalatenango
Nueva Concepcion	19	(El Salvador) TBD, TBD	(El Salvador) ADFA Chalatenango
Futbol Santa Rosa	19	(El Salvador) TBD, TBD	(El Salvador) ADFA Chalatenango
Atletico Jr	19	(El Salvador) TBD, TBD	(El Salvador) ADFA Chalatenango 2023
Santo Tomas	19	(El Salvador) TBD, TBD	(El Salvador) ADFA Chalatenango 2023
C.D. San Antonio	19	(El Salvador) TBD, TBD	(El Salvador) ADFA Chalatenango 2023
Titanes Jr	19	(El Salvador) TBD, TBD	(El Salvador) ADFA Chalatenango 2023
Fuerte Santa Rosa	19	(El Salvador) TBD, TBD	(El Salvador) ADFA Chalatenango 2023
TBD	19	(El Salvador) TBD, TBD	(El Salvador) TBD
TBD	19	(El Salvador) TBD, TBD	(El Salvador) TBD
TBD	19	(El Salvador) TBD, TBD	(El Salvador) TBD
TBD	19	(El Salvador) TBD, TBD	(El Salvador) TBD
TBD	19	(El Salvador) TBD, TBD	(El Salvador) TBD
TBD	19	(El Salvador) TBD, TBD	(El Salvador) TBD
TBD	19	(El Salvador) TBD, TBD	(El Salvador) TBD
TBD	19	(El Salvador) TBD, TBD	(El Salvador) TBD
TBD	19	(El Salvador) TBD, TBD	(El Salvador) TBD
TBD	19	(El Salvador) TBD, TBD	(El Salvador) TBD
TBD	19	(El Salvador) TBD, TBD	(El Salvador) TBD
TBD	19	(El Salvador) TBD, TBD	(El Salvador) TBD
Antepec	19	(El Salvador) TBD, TBD	(El Salvador) ADFA San Vicente
Huracan	19	(El Salvador) TBD, TBD	(El Salvador) ADFA San Vicente
San Antonio Izcanales	19	(El Salvador) TBD, TBD	(El Salvador) ADFA San Vicente 2023
A.D. SESA	19	(El Salvador) TBD, TBD	(El Salvador) ADFA San Vicente 2023
C.D. San Emigdio	19	(El Salvador) TBD, TBD	(El Salvador) ADFA San Vicente 2023
A.D. Libertad	19	(El Salvador) TBD, TBD	(El Salvador) ADFA San Vicente 2023
A.D. Jiboa	19	(El Salvador) TBD, TBD	(El Salvador) ADFA San Vicente 2023
Atletico de la Cruz	19	(El Salvador) TBD, TBD	(El Salvador) ADFA San Vicente 2023
San Ildefonso	19	(El Salvador) TBD, TBD	(El Salvador) ADFA San Vicente 2023
AD Sonsonate	19	(El Salvador) TBD, TBD	(El Salvador) ADFA Sonsonate 2024-2025
San Jose Metalio	19	(El Salvador) TBD, TBD	(El Salvador) ADFA Sonsonate 2024-2025
C.D. Juventud Armeniense	19	(El Salvador) TBD, TBD	(El Salvador) ADFA Sonsonate
Juventud Metalio	19	(El Salvador) TBD, TBD	(El Salvador) ADFA Sonsonate
Renacimiento F.C.	19	(El Salvador) TBD, TBD	(El Salvador) ADFA Sonsonate
A.D. Acaxual	19	(El Salvador) TBD, TBD	(El Salvador) ADFA Sonsonate
C.D. América	19	(El Salvador) TBD, TBD	(El Salvador) ADFA Sonsonate
C.D. El Sunza	19	(El Salvador) TBD, TBD	(El Salvador) ADFA Sonsonate
C.D Santos Domingo	19	(El Salvador) TBD, TBD	(El Salvador) ADFA Sonsonate
CD Acajutla	19	(El Salvador) TBD, TBD	(El Salvador) ADFA Sonsonate
EF UTSO	19	(El Salvador) TBD, TBD	(El Salvador) ADFA Sonsonate
Santos FC	19	(El Salvador) TBD, TBD	(El Salvador) ADFA Sonsonate
Nuevo General	19	(El Salvador) TBD, TBD	(El Salvador) ADFA Sonsonate
Fenix FC	19	(El Salvador) TBD, TBD	(El Salvador) ADFA Sonsonate 2023
C.D. Sonzacate	19	(El Salvador) TBD, TBD	(El Salvador) ADFA Sonsonate 2023
CD Las Palmas	19	(El Salvador) TBD, TBD	(El Salvador) ADFA Sonsonate 2023
Inter City	19	(El Salvador) TBD, TBD	(El Salvador) ADFA Sonsonate 2023
AFM San Isidro	19	(El Salvador) TBD, TBD	(El Salvador) ADFA Sonsonate 2023
FC Los Laureles B	19	(El Salvador) TBD, TBD	(El Salvador) ADFA Sonsonate 2023
FC Renacimiento	19	(El Salvador) TBD, TBD	(El Salvador) ADFA Sonsonate 2023
EF Virtientes	19	(El Salvador) TBD, TBD	(El Salvador) ADFA Sonsonate 2023
CD Nanulingo	19	(El Salvador) TBD, TBD	(El Salvador) ADFA Sonsonate 2023
Buenos Aires F.C.	19	(El Salvador) TBD, TBD	(El Salvador) ADFA Sonsonate 2023
AD Metalio	19	(El Salvador) TBD, TBD	(El Salvador) ADFA Sonsonate 2023
Escuela no a las Drogas	19	(El Salvador) TBD, TBD	(El Salvador) ADFA Santa Ana 2024-2025
C.D. Atletico Sandoval	19	(El Salvador) TBD, TBD	(El Salvador) ADFA Santa Ana 2024-2025
Escuela la Rene Leiva	19	(El Salvador) TBD, TBD	(El Salvador) ADFA Santa Ana 2024-2025
C.D. Danubio Jr	19	(El Salvador) TBD, TBD	(El Salvador) ADFA Santa Ana 2024-2025
ESF Texis	19	(El Salvador) TBD, TBD	(El Salvador) ADFA Santa Ana 2024-2025
EF Esperanza	19	(El Salvador) TBD, TBD	(El Salvador) ADFA Santa Ana 2024-2025
Escuela ADFA	19	(El Salvador) TBD, TBD	(El Salvador) ADFA Santa Ana 2024-2025
Suchitoto Municipal FC	19	(El Salvador) TBD, TBD	(El Salvador) ADFA 2024-2025
Rosario F.C.	19	(El Salvador) TBD, TBD	(El Salvador) ADFA Cuscatlan 2024-2025
C.D. El Espino	19	(El Salvador) TBD, TBD	(El Salvador) ADFA Cuscatlan 2024-2025
A.D. Tenancingo	19	(El Salvador) TBD, TBD	(El Salvador) ADFA Cuscatlan 2024-2025
CD Juvenil Santa Cruz	19	(El Salvador) TBD, TBD	(El Salvador) ADFA Cuscatlan 2024-2025
Divisiones Menores de CD FAS	19	(El Salvador) TBD, TBD	(El Salvador) ADFA Cuscatlan 2024-2025

== See also ==
- Football in El Salvador – overview of football sport
