= La Palma, El Salvador =

La Palma
- District
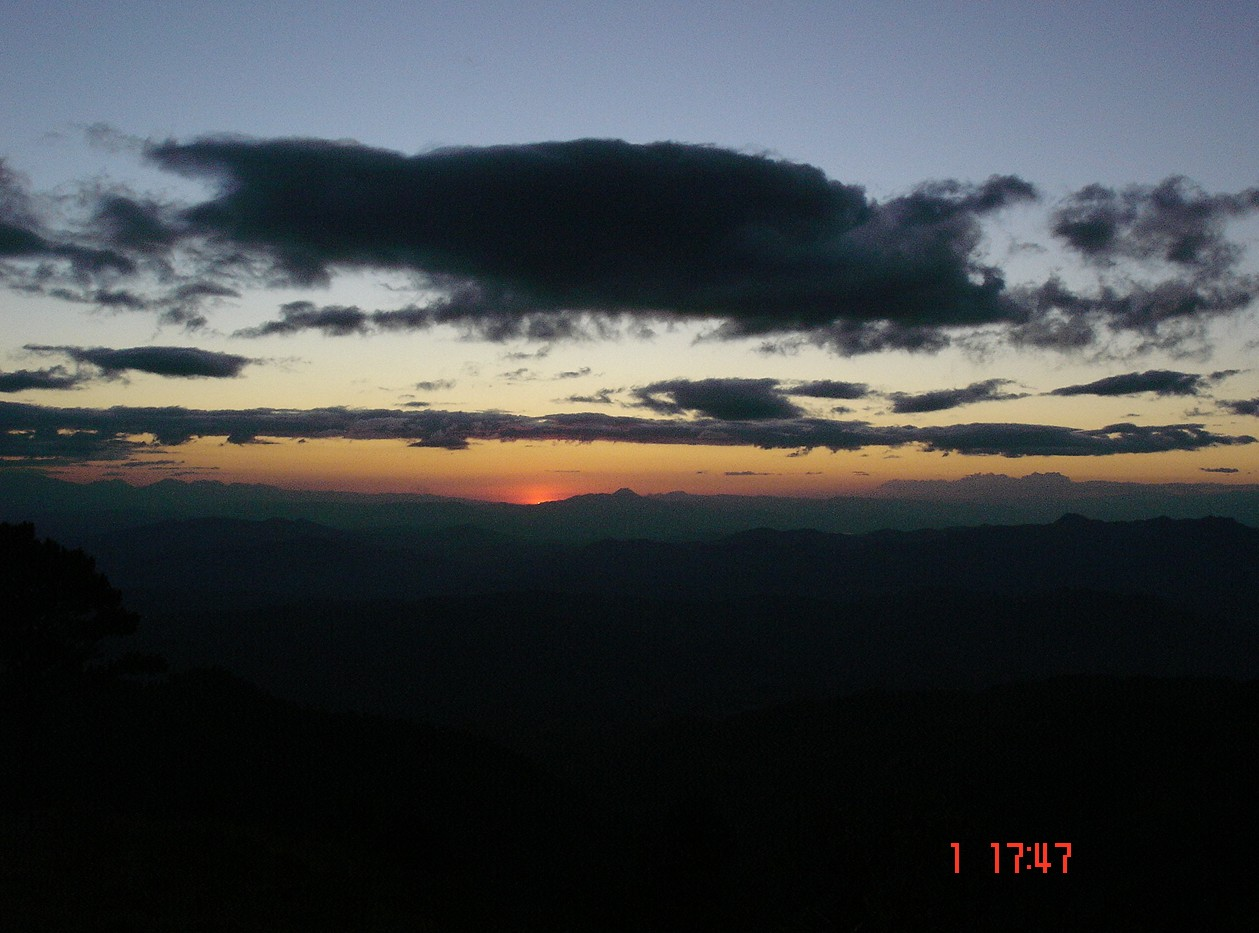
- Panorama of the municipality of La Palma from the mountains

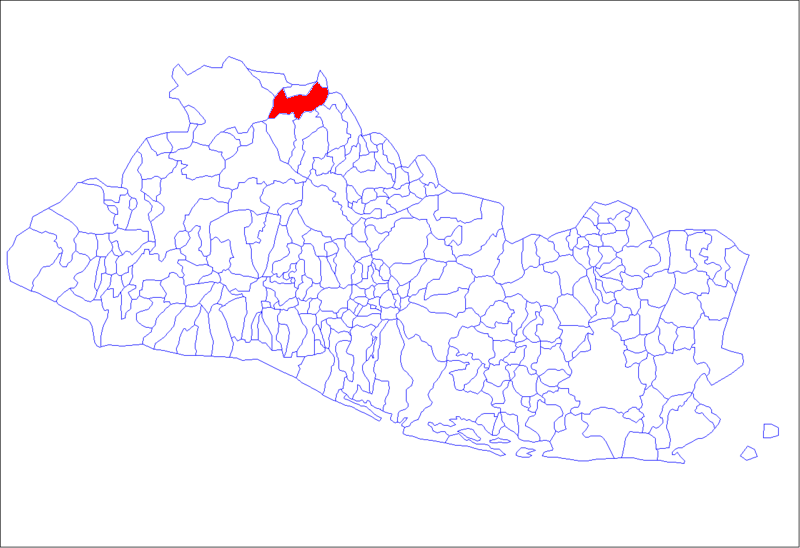
- Location of the municipality of La Palma in El Salvador

- Location in El Salvador
- Coordinates: 14°19′N 89°10′W
- Country: El Salvador
- Department: Chalatenango
- Municipality: Chalatenango Norte

Government

Area
  - District: 135.60 km^{2} (52.36 sq mi)
- Elevation: 1,059 m (3,474 ft)

Population (2024)
  - District: 13,066
  - Rank: 101st in El Salvador
  - Urban: 3,185
  - Rural: 9,881
- Website: lapalma.com.sv

La Palma is a district in the Chalatenango Department of El Salvador. The municipality, located in a mountainous area of the country, covers an area of 135.60 km^{2} and as of 2006 had an approximate population of 24,000.

It has historical importance since it played a fundamental role as a site for negotiations and battles between guerrillas and the government during Civil War of El Salvador.

Much of the municipality is mountainous and has a thriving artisan community. It is one of the most notable centres of craft in the country and the revenue generated from crafts through tourism and exports are crucial to the economy.

== History ==
Arising from the colonial period, the name derives from a place formerly called the Palmita, a small village in the area located near Nonuapa River. After a flood of that river in 1882, their settlers moved to the present place and founded La Palma. In 1959 by Legislative Decree, it became a town and municipality, consisting of the cantons of Los Horcones, Los Planes, Las Granadillas, El Gramal, San José Sacaré, El Túnel, El Aguacatal and San Josecalera.

The area has great relevance in the History of El Salvador since it played a prominent role in the solution of civil war. From 1980, the municipality was a platform of the ideological work of the guerrillas and later, it served as a battleground for combat between the insurgents and the army. On October 15, 1984, the president Jose Napoleón Duarte and the leaders of the Frente Farabundo Martí para la Liberación Nacional (FMLN) had their first encounter, initiating the treaty that would culminate with Peace Accords of Chapultepec.

== Geography ==
The municipality covers an area of approximately 131,89 km^{2}. Its jurisdictional borders are: to the north with San Ignacio, to the south with Agua Caliente, the east with Honduras and the municipalities of San Fernando, San Francisco Morazán and La Reina, and to the west with Metapán and Citalá, borders by the Lempa River.

La Palma is part of the mountainous zone of El Salvador, enjoying a cool climate. Administratively, the municipality is divided in 8 cantons and 87 small villages (caserios) in the rural area and 6 districts in the urban area. On July 1 of 1956, it was estimated that the population of La Palma was 5,337, 2,780 male and 2,957 female. In 2006, however it was calculated that municipality of La Palma had a total population of 24,000 inhabitants in the urban and rural areas.

=== Climate ===
Climate data for La Palma, El Salvador (1991–2020)
Month	Jan	Feb	Mar	Apr	May	Jun	Jul	Aug	Sep	Oct	Nov	Dec	Year
Mean daily maximum °C (°F)	26.7 (80.1)	28.6 (83.5)	30.1 (86.2)	30.5 (86.9)	28.9 (84.0)	27.5 (81.5)	28.0 (82.4)	27.9 (82.2)	27.1 (80.8)	26.5 (79.7)	26.0 (78.8)	26.2 (79.2)	27.8 (82.0)
Daily mean °C (°F)	19.7 (67.5)	20.8 (69.4)	22.0 (71.6)	23.1 (73.6)	22.7 (72.9)	22.0 (71.6)	21.9 (71.4)	21.8 (71.2)	21.5 (70.7)	21.2 (70.2)	20.3 (68.5)	19.8 (67.6)	21.4 (70.5)
Mean daily minimum °C (°F)	14.8 (58.6)	15.0 (59.0)	15.8 (60.4)	17.2 (63.0)	18.0 (64.4)	17.9 (64.2)	17.6 (63.7)	17.7 (63.9)	17.7 (63.9)	17.5 (63.5)	16.4 (61.5)	15.4 (59.7)	16.8 (62.2)
Average precipitation mm (inches)	1.7 (0.07)	15.1 (0.59)	19.4 (0.76)	81.4 (3.20)	278.7 (10.97)	446.6 (17.58)	317.3 (12.49)	397.8 (15.66)	475.8 (18.73)	289.0 (11.38)	50.6 (1.99)	5.7 (0.22)	2,379 (93.66)
Average relative humidity (%)	78	76	74	76	83	88	86	87	90	87	82	80	82.3
Source: Ministerio de Medio Ambiente y Recursos Naturales

== Economy ==
The economy of La Palma is based principally on the arts and crafts. 75% of the population lives off this trade and the revenue from tourism. The other 25% is involved in agriculture, the primary crops being vegetables, corn, beans and coffee.

=== Arts ===
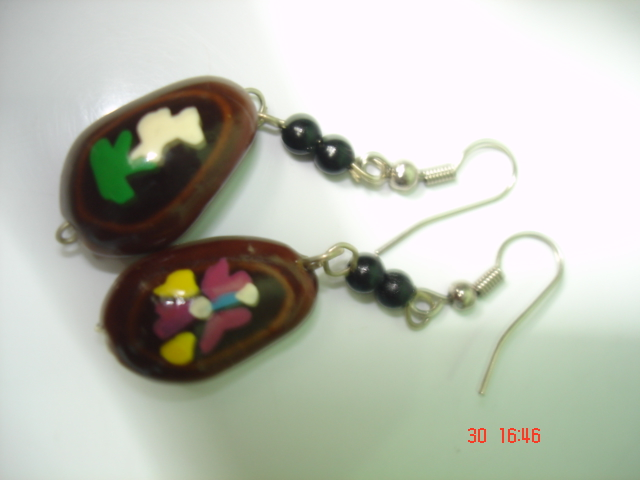
Locally made earrings

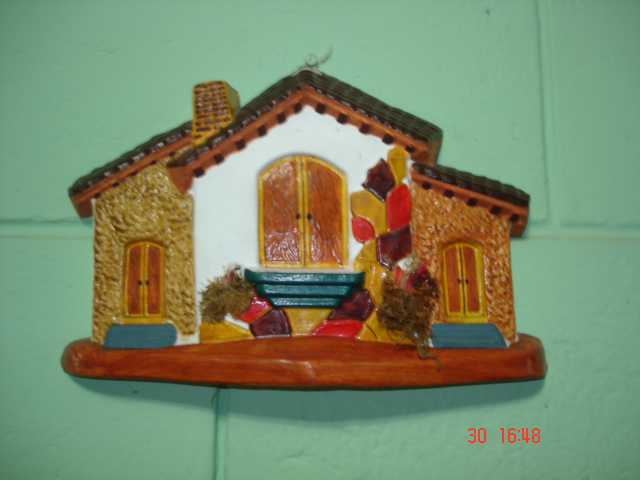
Partly made with mud

In the 1970s, Fernando Llort developed the arts in the municipality, developing an artisan industry that is the main employer in La Palma. There are around 100 crafts factories in the locality, half of which are dedicated to export. The growth of the artisan export in the municipality does not correspond to the national trend.

=== Agriculture ===
Coffee production is, according to the municipal economic report of 2006, the second most important industry in La Palma, although it has been decreasing due to the strong competition of foreign producers. In 1988, coffee production accounted for over half of El Salvador's revenue from exports, whereas for 2004 it has fallen dramatically to just 7%.

=== Tourist attractions ===
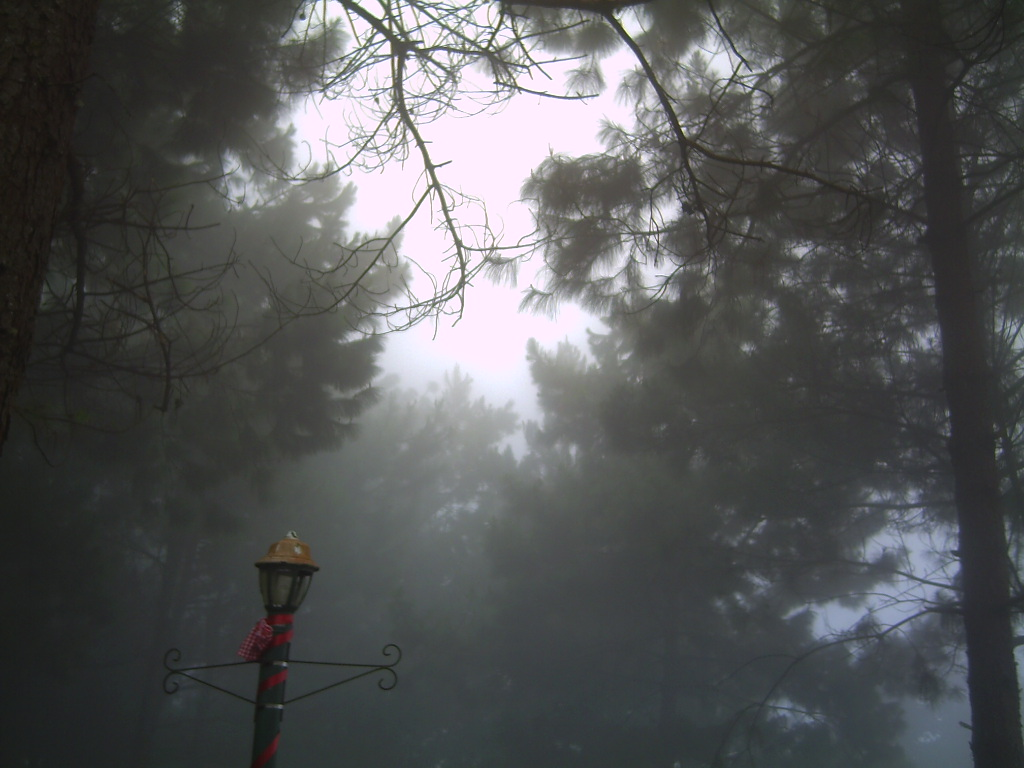
The Miramundo Forest

- 13 kilometers outside La Palma town is Miramundo. It is located in the hill forest at an altitude of 2400 metres and is noted for its cool climate. The average temperature average of Miramundo is just 12 °C.
- 3 kilometers away is San Ignacio, a small town at 1010 metres. There are hotels and several organized tourist activities in the area. Citalá and the Lempa River are just a few minutes north of San Ignacio.
- Las Pilas is located in mountain forest of La Palma, with a very cold climate, even more so than Miramundo. The main agricultural products there are blackberries, strawberries, peaches, lettuce and cabbages.

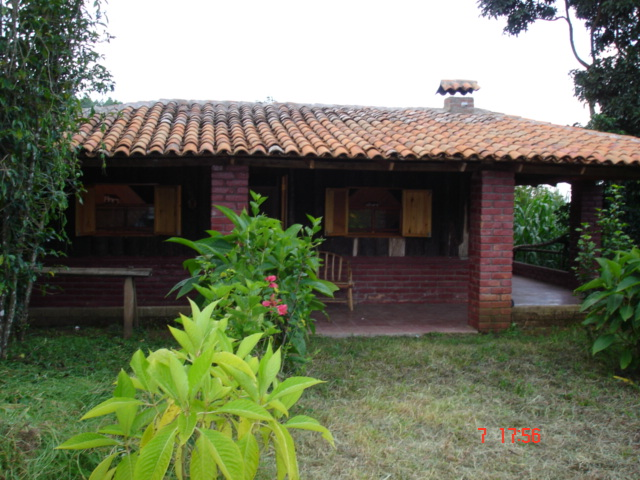
Casa de Campo in the Canton of Los Planes.

- The Cayahuanca Stone (Piedra Cayahuanca) is to 4 kilometers to the north of San Ignacio between Honduras and El Salvador, approximately 1550 metres above sea level. The rock marks the territorial border, giving a panoramic view of both countries. During Easter, the local inhabitants and visitors meet at the point of Cayahuanca the Stone and camp overnight.
- El Pital is 12 kilometers from the town of La Palma. At a height of 2730 metres it is the highest point of the Salvadoran territory. It is a mountain in the middle of a cloudy forest that has an average annual temperature of 10 °C. On April 13, 2004, the temperature hit record lows and much of the hill was covered by a frost and ice that caused commotion between the settlers, attributing the phenomenon to a supposed " nevada"

== See also ==
- Concepcion de Ataco
- Apaneca
- El Pital
- Antiguo Cuscatlan
