= Nahutec =

Salvadoran folk-pop band

- Origin: San Salvador, El Salvador
- Genres: Folk-pop; pop
- Years active: 1982–present
- Labels: DICESA Records
- Members: Sonia Evelyn Guzmán; Margarita Veliz; Gilberto A. Vassilio; Roberto Marroquín; Andrés Eduardo Ayala; Oliverio Rivas; César Edgardo Melara Cruz

Nahutec was a Salvadoran band and formed in 1982. Originally it was composed by Sonia Evelyn Guzmán, Margarita Veliz, Gilberto A. Vassilio, Roberto Marroquín, Andrés Eduardo Ayala, Oliverio Rivas and César Edgardo Melara Cruz; as a result of a cultural project carried out by the Technological University of El Salvador.

Nahutec was widely recognized for the success of their songs "La Máquina de Hacer Pájaros" and "Bajo el Asfalto".

== History ==
In the early 1980s, El Salvador was in civil war.

The Culture Unit of the Technological University of El Salvador summoned its students to carry out an Ibero-American music laboratory in early 1983. Of all the students, only 7 persisted, which ended up creating the group with the name Nahutec.

"Nahutec" is a combination of the words "nahuatl", referring to the country's indigenous roots, and "UTEC", which are the initials of the university (Universidad Tecnológica de El Salvador).

The first song they recorded was "Bajo el Asfalto" through DICESA, which became an instant hit in El Salvador, debuting in La Femenina radio. Then, they released their second single "La Máquina de Hacer Pájaros", which was originally written by Daniel Rucks. It became a huge success, becoming along with "Bajo el Asfalto" their most recognized songs.

== Members ==
- Sonia Evelyn Guzmán – vocals
- Margarita Veliz
- Gilberto A. Vassilio
- Roberto Marroquín
- Andrés Eduardo Ayala
- Oliverio Rivas
- César Edgardo Melara Cruz

== Discography ==
Singles

- 1983: "Bajo el Asfalto" / "Ni Una Palabra" (Roque Narvaja)
- 1984: "La Máquina de Hacer Pájaros" (Daniel Rucks) / "Así Soy Yo"
- 1985: "Los Tontos No Olvidamos Jamás" / "Barrilete" (Claudia Lars, Fernando Llort)
- 1987: "Tobías Y El Aeroplano" (Daniel Rucks) / "Naturaleza" (Daniel Rucks)
