= Agave F.C. =

- Full name: Agave Futból Clube
- Nickname(s): Los Henequeros
- Founded: 1974
- Ground: Grupo Escolar; Cantón El Platanar, San Miguel, El Salvador
- League: ADFA San Miguel

Agave Futból Clube, commonly known just as Agave FC, is a professional soccer club located in Cantón El Platanar, Moncagua, San Miguel, El Salvador. ADFA San Miguel

== Honours ==
Agave's first trophy was the Liga Ascensio, which they won in 1982. They won 1 Segunda División title in 1982.

Agave's honours include the following:

=== Domestic honours ===
==== Leagues ====
- Primera División de Fútbol de El Salvador
  - Runners up (1): N/A
- Segunda División de Fútbol Salvadoreño and predecessors
  - Champions: (1): 1982

== Stadium ==
- TBD, San Miguel, El Salvador, El Salvador (TBD–Present)
  - TBD, San Miguel, El Salvador, El Salvador (TBD–Present)

Agave plays its home games at TBD located in Canton El Platanar, Moncagua, San Miguel, El Salvador. The stadium has a capacity of 3,000 people

== Notable players ==
=== Domestic and foreign players ===
Players with senior international caps:

- (El Salvador) Manfredi Chicas
- (El Salvador) TBD
- (Honduras) TBD

=== Team captains ===
Name	Years
(El Salvador) TBD	TBD
(El Salvador) TBD	TBD
(El Salvador) TBD	TBD
(El Salvador) TBD	TBD

== Head coaches ==
- (El Salvador) Ovidio Hernández

== Records ==
=== Club records ===
- First Match (prior to creation of a league): vs. TBD (a club from TBD), Year
- First Match (official): vs. TBD, year
- Most points in La Primera: 00 points (00 win, 00 draws, 0 losses) Year/Year
- Least points in La Primera: 00 points (0 win, 0 draws, 00 losses) Year/year

=== Individual records ===
- Most capped player for El Salvador: 73 (28 whilst at Agave), TBD
- Most international caps for El Salvador while an Agave player: 28 (73 caps overall), TBD
- Most goals in a season, all competitions: unknown player, O (Year/year) (00 in League, 00 in Cup competitions)
- Most goals in a season, La Primera: TBD, 7

== League season performance ==
(1982)

Season	League	Position	GP	W	D	L	GF	GA	PTS	Playoffs	Pl.	W	D	L	GS	GA	PTS
1982	Primera División	8th	30	4	15	11	30	43	23	Did not qualify	-	-	-	-	-	-	-
