= Rucks Parker =

Salvadorean pop rock music duo

- Origin: San Salvador; El Salvador
- Genres: Pop rock; soft rock; rock
- Years active: 1992-1997
- Label: Parker Producciones
- Members: Daniel Rucks; Gerardo Parker

Rucks Parker was a Salvadoran pop rock duo originally from San Salvador, which was formed in 1992. The duo was made up of Gerardo Parker as composer and vocalist, and Daniel Rucks, as writer and vocalist.

Rucks Parker duo is recognized for songs like "Como Quisiera Que No Existieras", "Suena Como Mozart", "3/4 de Nada", "Mi Bestia Interior" and "Por Dónde Sale el Sol".

== History ==
Rucks Parker was formed in February 1992, when Gerardo Parker once invited Daniel Rucks to his newly opened studio to test its quality. Rucks and Parker already knew each other at the time, having previously worked together recording jingles for products Parker represented. Although Daniel Rucks, who only composed songs, insisted to Parker that only he will sing; finally both put their voices. They recorded around 4 hours, obtaining, as a result, their first song: "Mermelada de Tristeza". Later, they inserted this song on the country's radio stations, quickly becoming their first song recognized nationally.

Consequently, that same year they began the recording of what would be their first album, Bienvenidos a Mi Circo. This album would catapult them to success, releasing songs like "3/4 de nada", "Telarañas en la Mente", "Mermelada de Tristeza", "Me Llega Más Tu Mamá" y "Mi Bestia Interior". The song "Yo creo en El Salvador" is considered patriotic for the content of its lyrics, and gained radio rotation after January 2001 earthquakes.

In 1993, they released their second album Clorofila, which has recognized songs as "Suena Como Mozart".

In 1994, they released Una Madrugada del Siglo XX, considered the duo's most complex and best-produced album. "Como Quisiera Que No Existieras" is one of the most recognized songs of the duo.

In 1996, they released their fourth and last studio album, which is titled Crónicas de Nomeacuerdo, which contains "Por Dónde Sale El Sol" and "La Máquina de Hacer Pájaros".

In 1997, the duo announced their indefinite separation, although they continued to hold occasional concerts in subsequent years. In 2006 they announced the publication of non-released material: "Si En Verdad Me Quieres, Préstame Un Dólar", "Asesiné a Mi Novia", "Mi Segunda Oportunidad" and "Aún peor si pienso". In 2009 they released their first compilation album, Jazz Tubo, which compiles their greatest hits and material released in 2006.

== Discography ==
- 1992: Bienvenidos a mi Circo
- 1993: Clorofila
- 1994: Una Madrugada del Siglo XX
- 1996: Crónicas de Nomeacuerdo
- 2009: Jazz tubo

== Music videos ==
- "Mermelada de Tristeza"
- "3/4 de Nada"
- "Telarañas en La Mente"
- "Mi Bestia Interior"
- "Suena Como Mozart"
- "Vivir Para Siempre"
- "Ráfagas de Luz"
- "Quererme"
- "Como Quisiera Que No Existieras"
- "Todo x Ti"
- "Por Dónde Sale El Sol"
- "Cuando Dices Que Te Vas"
- “Si En Verdad Me Quieres, Préstame Un Dólar”
