= José Inocencio Alas =

Salvadorian activist

José Inocencio "Chencho" Alas (born 1934 in Chalatenango, El Salvador), one of ten children. He was a Catholic priest for many years, a friend to Archbishop Óscar Romero, and an advocate of peasant rights. Alas founded the Foundation for Self Sufficiency in Central America , and is currently the director of the Foundation for Sustainability and Peacemaking in Mesoamerica. He lives in the U.S. state of Texas with his wife. His brother is Monseñor Higinio Alas, a well known bishop in Costa Rica.

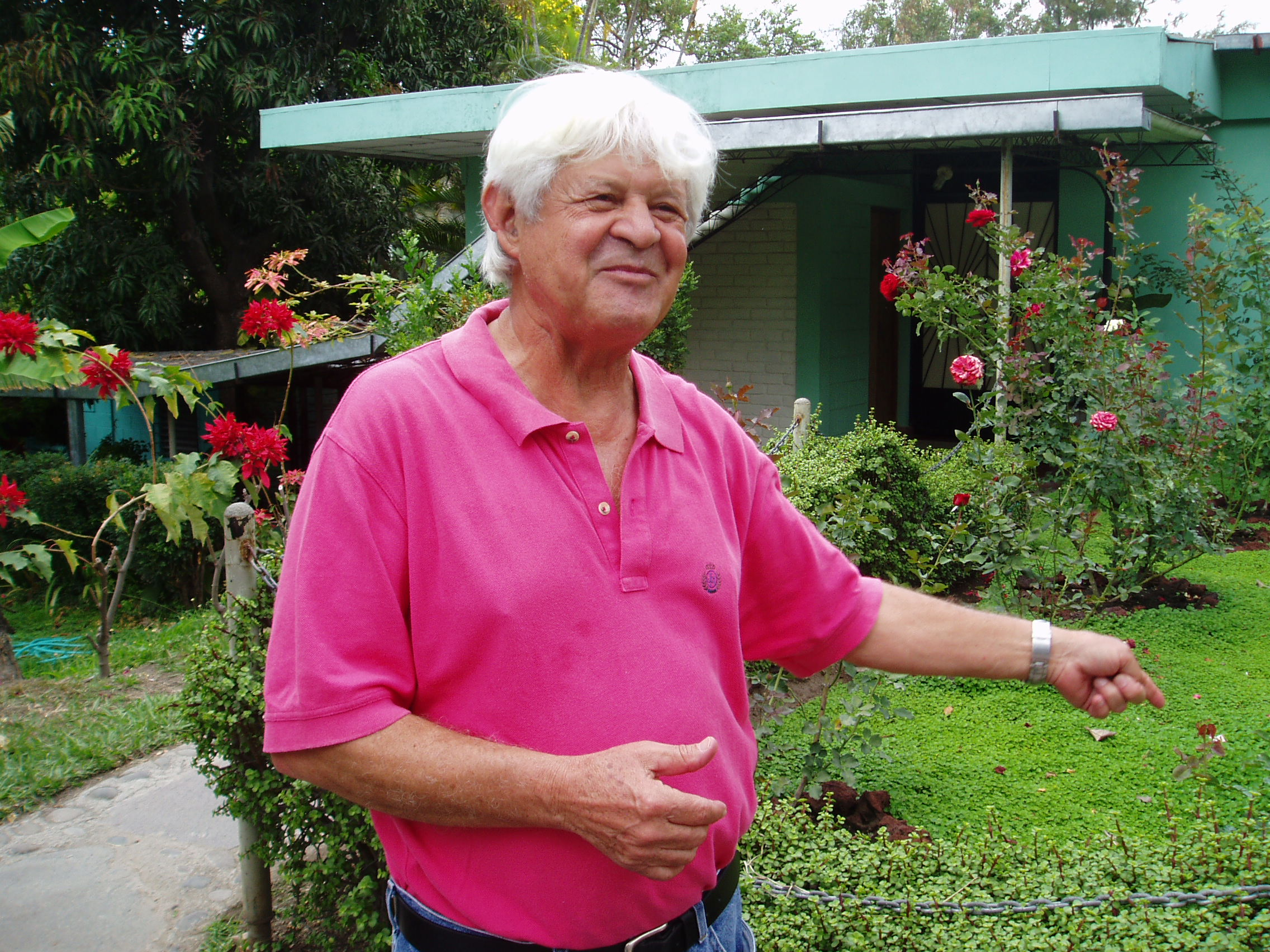
Chencho at the Rose Garden at the UCA in 2005 with a group of students

== Biography ==
Following study of theology and philosophy in El Salvador, Canada, Rome, Belgium, and Ecuador he began working as a priest in his native country in 1961. While working in the Mejicanos slum of San Salvador, he founded the Cursillos de Cristiandad movement in El Salvador.

In 1968, he became parish priest of Suchitoto, and founded the first Christian base communities, rooted in Liberation Theology and the reforms of the Second Vatican Council of 1965 in Medellín Conference of Latin American Bishops of 1968.

During the 1980s, Chencho continued working on behalf of the poor of Central America through a variety of different institutions, including the Inter American Development Bank and Capp Street Foundation.

The signing of the Peace Accords in 1992 brought an end to El Salvador's civil war. Chencho returned to El Salvador to help found ITAMA, the Institute of Technology, Environment, and Self-Sufficiency. As that organization's international representative, he relocated to the United States to facilitate fundraising in this country. In 1996, in order to better work for social justice and economic development, he helped to found the Foundation for Self-Sufficiency in Central America as an independent US-based non-profit. In 2000, he started the Mesoamerica Peace Movement, and in 2010 the Foundation for Sustainability and Peacemaking in Mesoamerica, a 501 (c) (3).

In 1990, Alas received the Peace Abbey Courage of Conscience Award for bringing the social gospel to base communities in El Salvador and Nicaragua. In 2000, the Tanenbaum Center for Interreligious Understanding awarded Alas its Peace Activist Award "in recognition of his dedication to human rights, and notably for his efforts to preserve peace in El Salvador during the violent aftermath of its civil war."

Alas was awarded the Don Antonio Amaya Award from the Foundation for Self-Sufficiency in Central America as well as Catholic Digest's Twelve Catholic Heroes for America and the World (October 2007).

== Writings ==
- Iglesia, Tierra, y Lucha Campesina: Suchitoto, El Salvador 1968-1977.
- Land, Liberation, and Death Squads, a Priest's Story. Suchitoto, El Salvador, 1968-1977. Jan 2017.
