= Cayahuanca Stone =

The Cayahuanca Stone (Piedra Cayahuanca ) is a stone located some 4 kilometers to the north of San Ignacio, Chalatenango on the border between Honduras and El Salvador, approximately 1550 metres above sea level. The rock serves as a mark of the border, giving a panoramic view of both countries.

During Easter, the local inhabitants and visitors meet at the point of Cayahuanca the Stone and camp overnight.
