= Fernando Llort =

Salvadoran artist (1949–2018)

Fernando Llort Choussy (7 April 1949 – 10 August 2018) was a Salvadoran artist, often dubbed "El Salvador's National Artist" by the Foundation for Self Sufficiency in Central America (now called EcoViva).

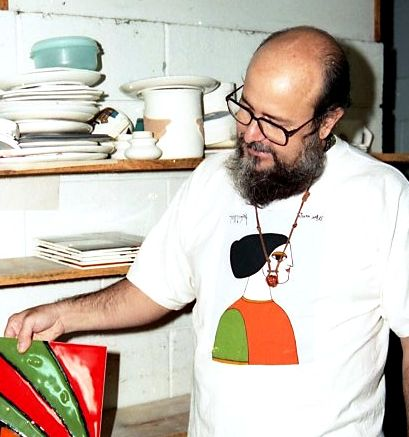
Fernando Llort

Fernando Llort was a man of passion, spirituality, religion, and community. He was also an idealist. In his younger years, Llort traveled abroad, originally, with the intention to become a priest. Llort visited two seminaries, one in La Ceja a small town in Medellin, Colombia, another Toulouse, France, but eventually decided against priesthood, as his calling and passion for art was much stronger.

He is known for teaching the citizens of the small town of La Palma, Chalatenango, how to make a living through art. His style is colorful and often childlike; it can be compared to that of Joan Miró and in some instances to that of Pablo Picasso.

== Biography ==
=== Personal life ===
Fernando Llort was born in San Salvador, El Salvador, on 7 April 1949 to Baltasar Llort and Victoria Choussy.

Llort was always creating from a young age, whether it was ceramics with his master César Sermeño, or using musicality as a means of expression, Llort was not shy of exploring many artistic practices.

In 1973 Fernando Llort married Estela Chacón in La Palma, Chalatenango where they would live and raise their family from 1973 to 1979, until they moved to San Salvador, the capital of El Salvador during the beginning of the Civil War (1979–1992).

Llort and Cachón had three children: Juan Pablo, a chemical engineer; Angel Fernando, a musician; and Maria Jose who manages much of Fernando Llort's business.

Fernando Llort died on 10 August 2018.

=== Education ===
Fernando Llort started his post secondary education at the University of El Salvador in the early 1960s where he studied architecture, but he dropped out for unknown reasons. He continued to explore his interests of spirituality in 1966 when Llort traveled to Medellin, Colombia where he studied religion at the seminary in La Ceja. This religious bent can be seen in the symbols present throughout his work—one can almost always see a church, a dove or an all-seeing eye. Afterwards, Llort spent the next three years studying in France at the University of Toulouse, graduating with a Bachelors of Philosophy, and then at the Université catholique de Louvain in Belgium, where he'd eventually earn his degree in theology. During his time in Europe, Llort painted in his free time, which led to his first exhibition of works in France.

Llort spent many years away from his home country in his pursuit of education. During Llort's time abroad, he felt a disconnect from his culture and would rekindle it in his exhibition in France, where inspiration of Mayan culture influenced Llort's work to connect themes of identity to relate to his Latin American heritage.

Finishing his time in Europe, Llort traveled to study in the United States at the Louisiana State University in Baton Rouge, Louisiana, where he would start taking formal art courses, along with modern architecture and English classes. Llort was not satisfied with the rigidity of North American education, as it restricted his creativity. Experiencing discrimination, materialism and other values of American society that Llort was not fond of, he left America in 1971, and returned to El Salvador.

=== Post-education ===
Fernando Llort and a few other of his friends began to explore music inspired by the American Hippie movement of the 1960s upon his return to El Salvador. They would go on to form a band called La Banda del Sol (The Sun Band). During their time together, they would create and compose songs heavily influenced by religion and spirituality. These themes would eventually translate in the estilo Palmeño (Palmeño style), a style Llort created himself.

To escape instability, in 1971 he and other young artists moved to the town of La Palma in the northern region of El Salvador, close to the border with Honduras. La Palma was a small, low-income town with high crime rates, and low employment at the time of Llort's arrival. The simple life he lived in the mountains was a refuge from what was happening throughout the rest of the country. Llort's assimilation into the village life and lush natural environment greatly influenced his art. Once, while touring the canals, Llort noticed a child rubbing a copinol tree seed against the ground to reveal a white surface, framed by the brown sides of the outer casing of the seed. This would become a staple in La Palma's and Llort's history, as it incorporated the main essence of estilo Palmeño; the natural surface provided by the land, and folk art style created by Llort.

=== Artistic practice ===
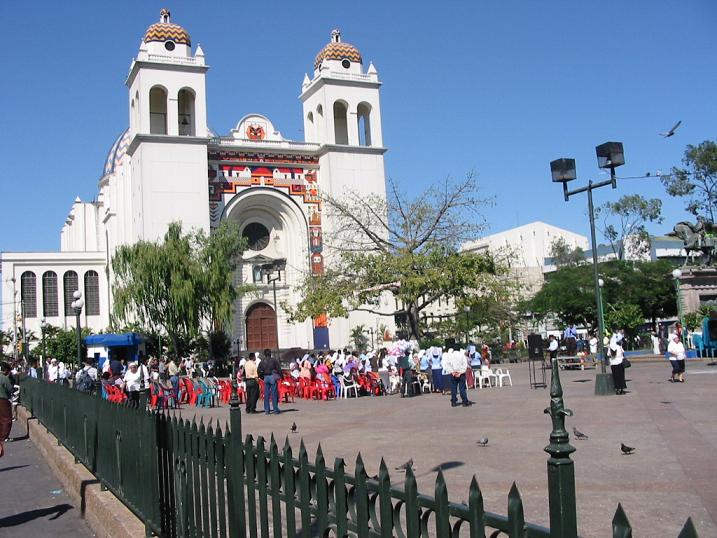
View of the mural on the facade of the Metropolitan Cathedral of San Salvador prior to its removal

Fernando Llort's artistic practice was formed off themes of identity that often coincided with idealist, spiritual beliefs.

During his time in La Palma, Chalatenango he would spend a decade (1972–1979) cultivating and building the local art community by offering workshops of woodworking and painting to the local campesino. Llort founded his first cooperative workshop in La Palma where he taught the local townspeople artisanal craftsmanship, like painting and woodworking. Llort named the workshop La Semillia de Dios (The Seed of God) in relation to where it all started.

Near the end of the 1970s, La Palma was known as the center of folk art in El Salvador. In 1981, Llort travelled back to San Salvador, El Salvador to open the Fernando Llort Gallery of Art and Handicrafts named El Arbol De Dios.

In contemporary terms, most would categorize Estilo Palmeño, the term coined by Fernando Llort for his art, as Naif/Naive art as it did not take much technical skill to execute, but was focused more on the content and narrative of the image produced. Fernando Llort's reason for art making was not a critique on the political climate or the social oppression of the war El Salvador was facing, but to strengthen the Salvadorean identity using landscapes, indigenous symbols and capturing the daily life of the people.

Fernando Llort's use of identity was a homage to the natural landscapes of El Salvador. He would use groupings of houses or hills as symbolism for community. Working with simple shapes, fully saturated colours, and dark outlines, Estilo Palmeño is a mix of abstract, geometric and linear shapes. The reoccurring religious symbols of doves, suns, and a mosaic like structure to each craft was intentional to contrast the difficult times the civil war caused. Llort's goal was "to reconnect my roots as a Latin American, and help define our people in their human and spiritual dimensions" Today, La Palma is renowned for its native artists and handicraft artisans. Fernando Llort and the other artists from San Salvador are recognized as founders of the town's artisanal movement, which provides an opportunity for campesinos to learn about art, and helps them find sources of income other than field work. Llort himself launched the project to establish the Center for Comprehensive Development (Spanish: Centro de Desarrollo Integral) and taught art classes. Once the civil war began, however, he left La Palma in 1980 and moved back to San Salvador, but still maintained his connections with the mountain people.

His work could also formerly be seen in the tiled ceramic mural he created for the facade of San Salvador's Metropolitan Cathedral in 1997. In late December 2011, Archbishop José Luis Escobar Alas ordered its removal without consulting the national government or the artist, and workers chipped off and destroyed all the 2,700 tiles of the mural.
