= A.D. Dulce Nombre de María =

Salvadoran football club

C.D. Atlético Dulce Nombre de María
- Full name: Clube Deportivo Atlético Dulce Nombre de María
- Founded: 2016
- Ground: Complejo Deportivo Dulce Nombre, El Salvador
- League: ADFA Chalatenango
- TBD: TBD

Clube Deportivo Atlético Dulce Nombre de María is a Salvadoran professional football club based in Chalatenango, El Salvador.

The club currently plays in the La Asociación Departamental de Fútbol Aficionado, the fourth tier of El Salvador football.

== Honours ==
=== League ===
- La Asociación Departamental de Fútbol Aficionado and predecessors (4th tier)
  - Champions (1): 2017
