= A.D. El Paraíso =

Salvadoran football club

AD El Paraiso
- Full name: Asoscion Deportiva El Paraiso
- Nickname: TBD
- Founded: 2016
- Ground: Cancha La Ceiba, El Salvador
- League: ADFA Chalatenango
- TBD: TBD

Asoscion Deportivo El Paraiso is a Salvadoran professional football club based in El Paraiso, Chalatenango, El Salvador.

The club currently plays in the ADFA Chalatenango in the fourth tier of El Salvador football.

They have previously played in the Tercera Division de Fútbol Salvadoreño.

The club was founded in 2016. The club went on hiatus from 2020. In August 2023, the club was rebranded as Futbol Club Nueva Juventud El Paraíso
