= La Máquina de Hacer Pájaros (song) =

1983 song by Nahutec

Single by Nahutec
- B-side: "Así Soy Yo"
- Released: 1983
- Recorded: 1983
- Genre: Pop
- Length: 3:46
- Label: DICESA Records
- Songwriter(s): Daniel Rucks

"La Máquina de Hacer Pájaros" is a song written by Daniel Rucks and was recorded and performed in 1983 by Salvadoran group Nahutec, a musical project formed by students from the Technological University of El Salvador. This song became the most recognized song of the youth group, becoming one of the most emblematic of the 1980s in El Salvador. The song was re-recorded by Salvadoran duo Rucks Parker in 1996.

== Background ==
According to Sonia de Guzmán, Nahutec's main vocalist in 1983, after "Bajo el Asfalto" success in El Salvador, Roberto Marroquín met with Daniel Rucks; Rucks proposed them to choose one of his compositions and record it, consequently, Nahutec chose "La Máquina de Hacer Pájaros" because of its likeness with "Bajo el Asfalto" topics. As Guzmán says, though Rucks originally wanted the song to be interpreted by a male singer, Guzmán finally convinced him and told him: "Everything I'll sing will be a success".

== Lyrics and composition ==
The song was originally written by Daniel Rucks. When Rucks was 8 or 9 years old he lived in Argentina and wrote a tale as homework for his free redaction class in school. He was inspired by the 1971 comic strip García y la máquina de hacer pájaros, created by Argentine strip cartoonist Crist. When he was 10 or 11 years old he composed its music structure. Likewise, the song has no relationship with the group that Argentinian musician Charly García formed called La Maquina de Hacer Pájaros, because both had the same inspiration at different ends.

The song is written in the key of D major and follows the chord progression D-A in the verses, Em-A-G-D in the pre-choir, C-A in the bridge, and D-G-D-A in the chorus.

It tells the story of a man whose last name is García. García had a common life at work, and consequently, a lot of stress. When he got home, he always had a dream about a machine that could create birds; it filled him with joy and tranquility. One afternoon, Garcia went to the park where he activated his machine (three boxes), filling himself with joy when he saw the city full of birds flying. Passers-by, on the other hand, fail to understand Garcia's joy. The song emphasizes the power of dreams and the ability to fulfill them.

== Personnel ==
Nahutec members

- Sonia Evelyn Guzmán – vocals
- Margarita Veliz
- Gilberto A. Vassilio
- Roberto Marroquín
- Andrés Eduardo Ayala
- Oliverio Rivas
- César Edgardo Melara Cruz

Production

- Armando Zepeda – engineering, mixing, supervision
- Roberto Milchorena – artistic direction

== Rucks Parker version ==
"La Máquina de Hacer Pájaros"

Song by Rucks Parker

from the album Crónicas de Nomeacuerdo
- Released: 1996
- Recorded: 1995–1996
- Genre: Pop rock
- Length: 3:47
- Label: Parker Produciones
- Songwriter(s): Daniel Rucks

A version was recorded and released by the Salvadoran duo Rucks Parker in 1996, as part of their fourth and final album Crónicas de Nomeacuerdo. It features Gerardo Parker in main vocals and Daniel Rucks in background vocals.
