= San Buenaventura, El Salvador =

San Buenaventura
- District
- Location in El Salvador
- Coordinates: 13°32′0″N 88°23′0″W
- Country: El Salvador
- Department: Usulután Department
- Elevation: 1,742 ft (531 m)

Population
  - Total: 21,901
- Time zone: UTC-6

San Buenaventura is a district in the Usulután department of El Salvador.

== Sports ==
The local football club is named C.D. España and it currently plays in the Salvadoran Third Division.
