= Concepción Batres =

Municipality in the Usulután department of El Salvador

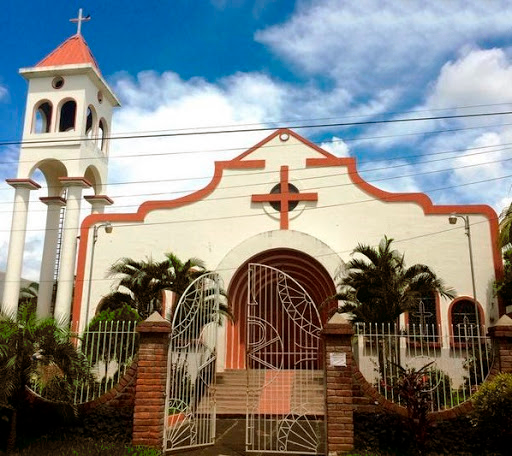

Concepción Batres is a municipality in the Usulután department of El Salvador. It is bordered to the north by El Tránsito (department of San Miguel) and Ereguayquín; to the east by El Tránsito (department of San Miguel) and Jucuarán; to the south by Usulután and to the west by Ereguayquín and Usulután.

== History ==
At the beginning of the last century it was known by the name of Río Batres, which divided the parties of Usulután and San Miguel. On the banks of this valiant river, in the hacienda of the same name, in the jurisdiction of the town of Ereguayquín, a village or hamlet also called Batres was constituted. During the administration of Mr. Jorge Meléndez and by Legislative Decree of March 5, 1920, the Batres canton was erected as a town, under the name of Concepción Batres, and the cantons of La Danta, San Ildefonso and Vado Marín, all segregated from the municipality of Ereguayquín, were annexed to its jurisdiction. Since its foundation, Concepción Batres, this municipality has always been part of the department and district of Usulután.

== Administration ==
For its administration, Concepción Batres is divided into 10 cantons and 29 hamlets. Being its cantons: El Cañal, El Paraisal, El Porvenir, Hacienda Nueva, La Anchila, La Danta, San Antonio, San Felipe, San Ildefonso and San Pedro.

== Culture ==
The patron saint festivities of Concepción Batres are celebrated from December 6 to 8, dedicated to the Immaculate Virgin of Concepción.

== Tourism ==
Some recommended places to visit in this municipality are the House of Culture, playgrounds and parks, Monte Fresco turicentro and Hacienda Nueva ecological park.

== Other information of interest ==
Concepción Batres has a territorial area of 119.05 square kilometers, has a population of more than 13,000 inhabitants and is 70 meters above sea level. It has the title of City, granted in 1996 and is located at a distance of 118 kilometers from San Salvador.
