= San Rafael Obrajuelo =

San Rafael Obrajuelo Distro de San Rafael Obrajuelo
- Municipality of El Salvador
- District of San Rafael Obrajuelo
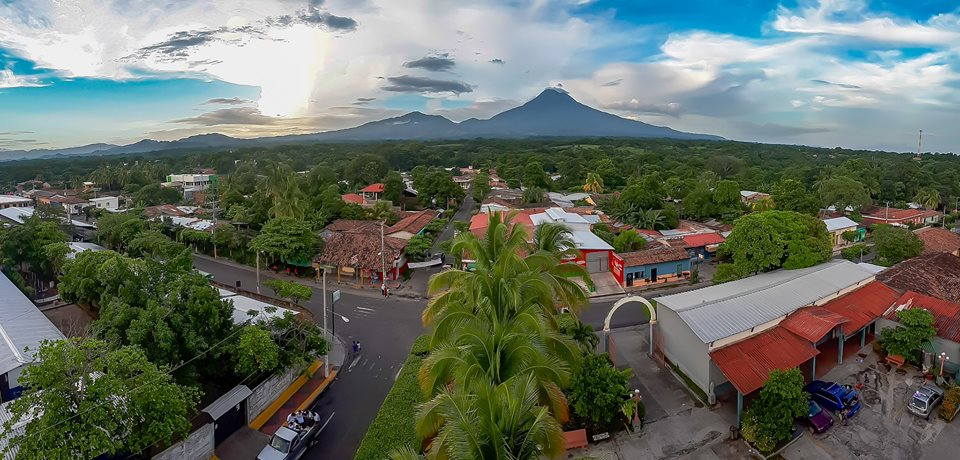

- Location in El Salvador
- Coordinates: 13°30′N 88°56′W
- Country: El Salvador
- Department: La Paz

Government
  - Mayor: Marcela Pineda Nuevas Ideas
- Elevation: 490 ft (150 m)

Population (2017)
  - Total: 11,403
  - Density: 2,680/sq mi (1,036/km^{2})

San Rafael Obrajuelo is a municipality in the department of La Paz, El Salvador. As of 2017 it was estimated to have a population of 11,403.

== History ==
According to the report of the Intendent of San Salvador Antonio Gutiérrez y Ulloa, in 1807 the estate of Obrajuelo, belonging to the Marquess of Aycinena existed. A prosperous settlement formed in the former state of Aycinena.

In mid-nineteenth century, the settlement had achieved notable commercial activity and retained the population required by law to form a new municipality. By the Legislative Decree of March 7, 1882, a town was erected under the name of San Rafael. Although the ereccional decree does not mention it, the new municipality founded in Obrajuelo and San Pedro Martir cantons, jurisdiction of San Juan Nonualco, its naming was considered a tribute for President Rafael Zaldívar, and performed during his tenure.

On March 30 of the same year, residents of the new municipality elected their first authorities, chaired by the provincial governor. On 1890, it had a popopulation of 900. Lately, out of habit, it has been called San Rafael Obrajuelo.

== Information ==
The municipality has an area of 11.01 km², with an elevation of 150 mamsl and 50 km away from San Salvador.

It is divided administratively in urban neighborhoods: San José, El Calvario, Concepción, El Centro, Nueva Alianza, and Las Delicias.

It is divided in cantons:

1. El Carao
2. La Longaniza
3. La Palma
4. San Jerónimo
5. San José Obrajuelo
6. San Pedro Martir

It also has 13 villages: El Centro, El Flor, Los Obrajes, San Jerónimo, Los Paredes, Los Realegeños, Los Alvarado, El Molino, Puente La Chaquina, San Miguel Obrajuelo, El Cobanal, La Palma, and Autopista

By 2015, it receives an allocation from FODES of $679,936.80.

The festivities are celebrated from October 10 through October 24 in honor of its patron St. Raphael Archangel.

== Sports ==
The local professional football club is named C.D. Maracaná San Rafael and it currently plays in the Salvadoran Third Division.
