= Foundation for Self Sufficiency in Central America =

American non-profit organization

The Foundation for Self Sufficiency in Central America (FSSCA) is a non-profit organization headquartered in Austin, Texas that works in partnership and solidarity with low-income communities in Central America.

FSSCA supports grassroots development emphasizing environmental sustainability, economic self-sufficiency, social justice, and peace.

== History ==
FSSCA was founded in 1996 with the intent of assisting the recovery of the people of Central America from the aftermath of the brutal Salvadoran Civil War (1980–1992). FSSCA's original executive director, José Inocencio Alas, has been honored by the Tanenbaum Center for Interreligious Understanding with its Peace Activist Award "in recognition of his dedication to human rights, and notably for his efforts to preserve peace in El Salvador during the violent aftermath of its civil war." Alas is profiled in the Tannebaum Center's recent publication, Peacemakers in Action: Profiles of Religion in Conflict Resolution, scheduled for release by Cambridge University Press in March 2007.

Since 1998, FSSCA has worked in partnership with the communities comprising the "Coordinadora del Bajo Lempa" near the Pacific Coast of El Salvador. The Coordinadora was originally formed from the mix of settlers relocated under the land reform provisions of the 1993 peace accords onto former plantation land in the Lempa River delta region. Primarily farmers and fishers, settlers organized in the mid-1990s to eliminate disastrous flooding, aggravated when floodgates upstream were opened without warning to the settlers along the river delta below. Their leadership evolved on a democratic model to attain sustainable development beyond flood control.

In 1998, the Coordinadora's communities committed themselves to ending the violence endemic to the region since the end of El Salvador's civil war. They declared their communities to comprise a Local Zone of Peace and resolved to change the region's culture of violence to one of reconciliation, collaborative problem solving and non-violent conflict resolution.

== Mission ==
FSSCA support to the Coordinadora's includes funding their administrative budget; a micro-lending credit program, supporting the development of their Culture of Peace and Conflict Management programs; home construction; the construction of the Coordinadora's field office and two disaster relief shelters. A strong component of the relationship is respect for the Coordinadora's internal decision making as to the allocation of funds, rather than externally determined earmarks.

FSSCA builds relationships between the Coordinadora and international organizations such as USAID, the US Embassy, the American Jewish World Service, the Overbrook Foundation, the Shefa Fund, the Communitas Charitable Trust. It organized the March 2000 Judeo-Christian Ecumenical Peace Conference in San Salvador, building bridges between the Jewish community and Salvadoran peasants. .

FSSCA also assists in writing and presenting project proposals to U.S.-based foundations and individuals, organizes delegations to visit El Salvador, and recruits volunteers to provide technical assistance to projects.
