= España F.C. (Usulután) =

CD España
- Full name: Club Deportivo España
- Founded: 1957; 68 years ago (as España Fútbol Clube )
- Ground: Cancha Municipal de San Buenaventura; San Buenaventura, Usulután, El Salvador / Estadio Municipal San Buenaventura
- Chairman: Alfonso Sánchez
- Manager: Jose Dagoberto Sosa
- League: Tercera Division de Fútbol Salvadoreño
- Apertura 2018: None

España Fútbol Clube is a Salvadoran professional football club based in San Buenaventura, Usulután, El Salvador.

The club currently plays in the Salvadoran Third Division.

Espana changed their name from Espana Futbol Clube to Clube Deportivo Espana.

== Honours ==
=== Domestic honours ===
- Segunda División Salvadorean and predecessors
  - Champions (1) : TBD
- Tercera División Salvadorean and predecessors
  - Champions:(1) : TBD

== Notable players ==
- (El Salvador) Alfredo Machuca

== List of coaches ==
- (El Salvador) Jose Dagoberto Sosa (2018)
- (El Salvador) Denis Waldemar Moreno (actualidad)
