= C.D. Platence =

CD Platence
- Full name: Club Deportivo Platence
- Founded: 2013
- Ground: Estadio Correcaminos, El Salvador
- League: Tercera Division de Fútbol Salvadoreño

Club Deportivo Platence is a Salvadoran professional football club based in San Francisco Gotera, Morazan, El Salvador.

The club currently plays in the Tercera Division de Fútbol Salvadoreño.

== List of coaches ==
- Nelson Wilfredo Gomez Alvarenga (Temporada 2018/19)
