= C.D. Maracaná San Rafael =

Salvadoran football club

- Full name: Club Deportivo Maracaná San Rafael
- Founded: 1998
- Ground: Estadio José Borja Castillo, San Rafael Obrajuelo, El Salvador
- Capacity: 2,000
- Chairman: Jorge Alberto Monterrosa Salomón
- Coach: Mauricio Alfaro
- League: Tercera Division de Fútbol Salvadoreño
- Clausura 2017: Grupo Centro Occidente B, 6th

Club Deportivo Maracaná San Rafael is a Salvadoran professional football club based in San Rafael Obrajuelo, La Paz, El Salvador.

The club currently plays in the Tercera Division de Fútbol Salvadoreño.
