= San Ignacio, El Salvador =

San Ignacio
- District
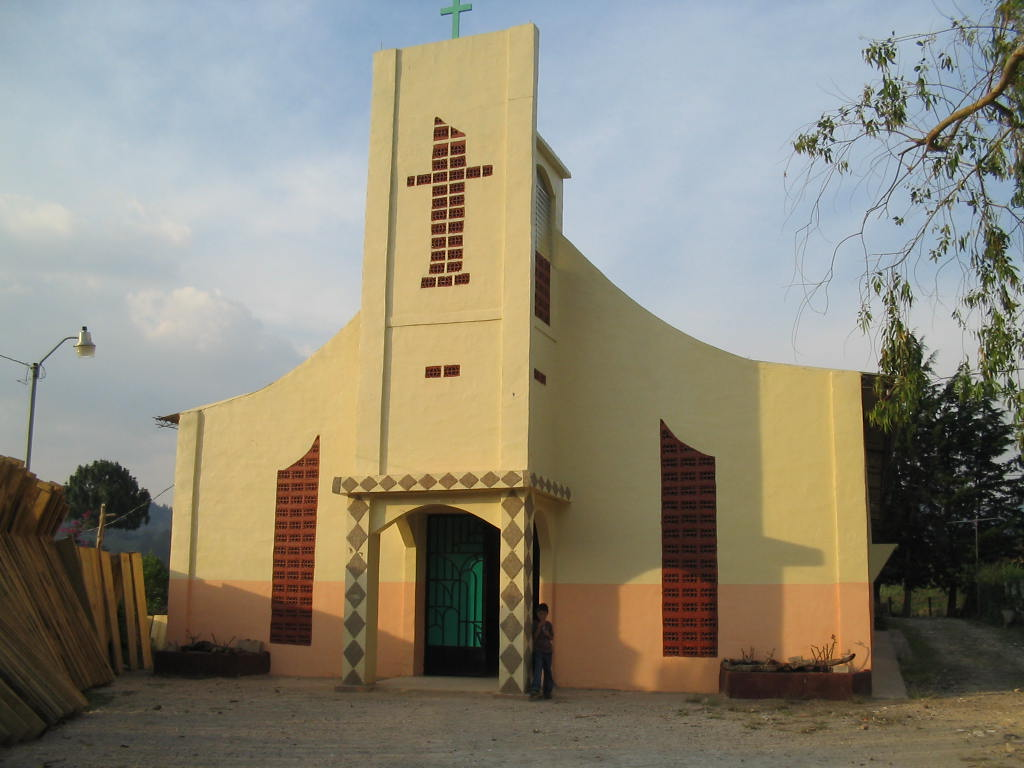

- Location in El Salvador
- Coordinates: 14°20′N 89°11′W
- Country: El Salvador
- Department: Chalatenango
- Municipality: Chalatenango Norte

Population (2024)
  - District: 9,159
  - Rank: 146th in El Salvador
  - Urban: 3,197
  - Rural: 5,962

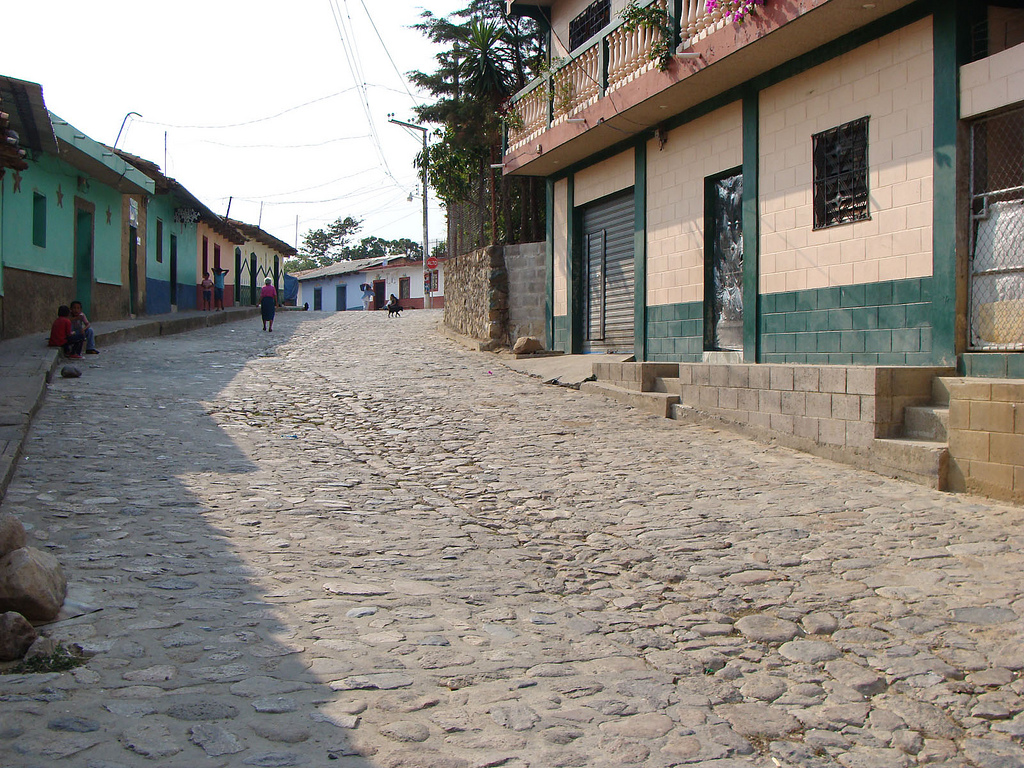
A street in San Ignacio

San Ignacio is a district of El Salvador.

It is located in the department of Chalatenango, to a distance of 87 km. from San Salvador, and to 8 km. of the international border with Honduras.
