= Moncagua =

- Municipality
- Location in El Salvador
- Coordinates: 13°32′N 88°15′W
- Country: El Salvador
- Department: San Miguel
- Elevation: 750 ft (230 m)

Population (2024 census)
  - Total: 24,167

Moncagua is a municipality in the San Miguel department of El Salvador.

Moncagua is also a well known area of hot springs. Moncagua is known as "tierra caliente" or "hot land" in literal English translation. From the Nauathl (language of the Lenca, the indigenous population that used to live there) it literally means land of rabbits, rocks and water.

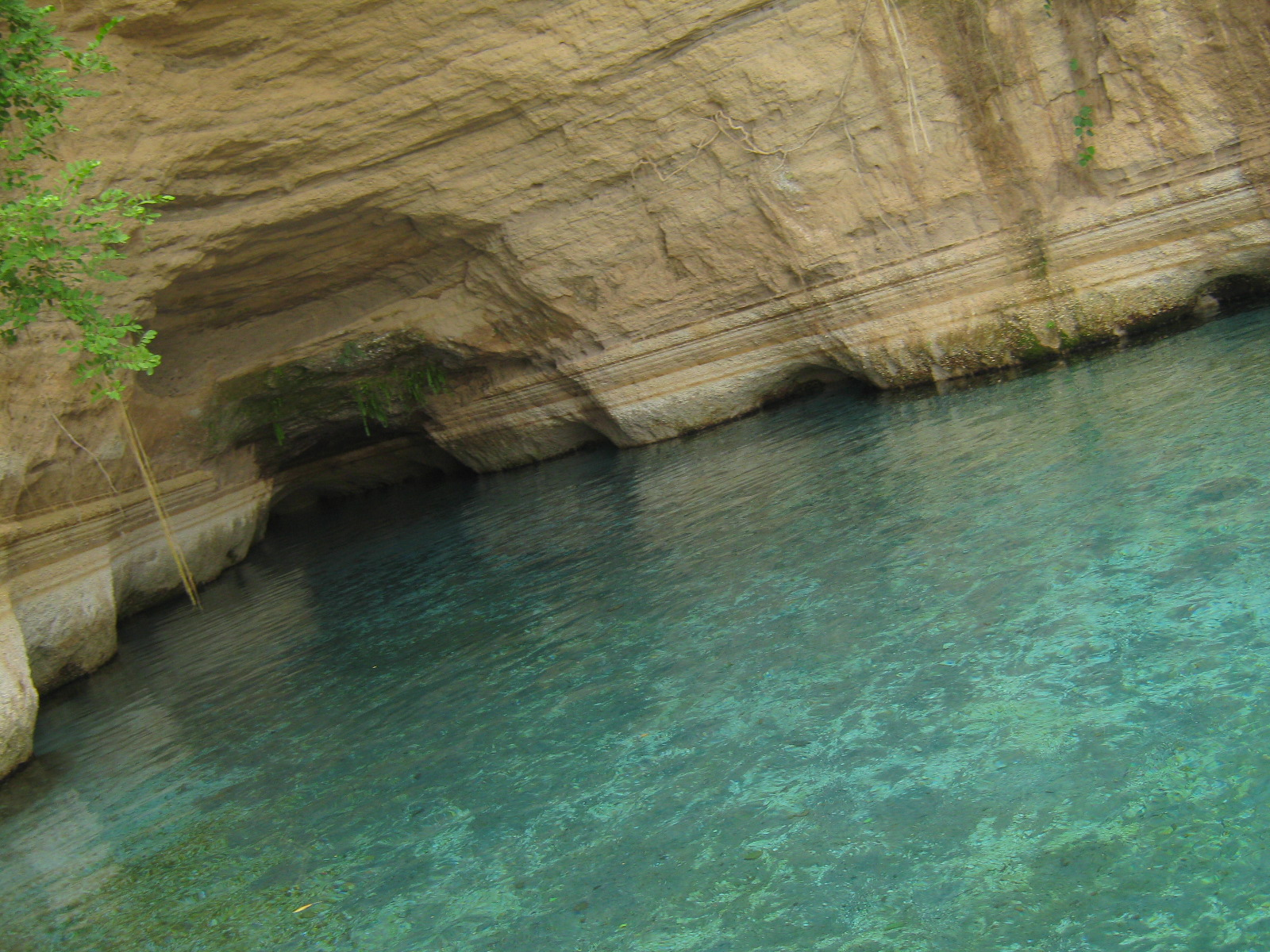
Moncagua, San Miguel

== Sports ==
The local football club is Atlético Chaparrastique, who have spent some seasons in the Salvadoran Second Division and almost secured promotion to the top tier in 2003.
