= Citalá =

- District
- Location in El Salvador
- Coordinates: 14°22′N 89°13′W
- Country: El Salvador
- Department: Chalatenango
- Municipality: Chalatenango Norte

Government
  - Mayor: José Lorenzo Valdivieso (since 2006) (ARENA)
- Elevation: 2,349 ft (716 m)

Population (2024)
  - District: 4,581
  - Rank: 203rd in El Salvador
  - Rural: 4,581
- Patron Saint: Virgin of Concepción
- Saint day: 8 December

Citalá is a district in the Chalatenango Department of El Salvador. In the Nahuat language its name means “the river of the stars”. In the Mayan Ch'orti' language it's referred to as Kujkaijá. As of 2013, it had a population of 4,270.

== Geography ==
It is 47 km from Chalatenango and in the suburbs of the frontier of Honduras. It has an elevation of 788 meters over sea level and is 119 km from San Salvador.

== Main sights ==
=== Church del Pilar-Citalá ===
The Church del Pilar-Citalá possibly built at the end of the 17th century or at the beginning of the 18th century. It is not known who built it.

Its architecture possesses a neoclassical style. The church is surrounded by an atrium that in turn is surrounded by an iron gate. Their facade has two bodies. In the inferior body, the main access in arch of half point form and other two feigned arches with ornamental elements meet. It also possesses six columns of Tuscan style inserted among the arches. This body is finished off by a triangular front which has a round crystal in the center and very marked entablatures of classic order. The superior body is decorated with half columns finished off with pinnacles and an arch of half point with two couples of columns of Tuscan style, which is in turn finished off with two pinnacles and kind of a bowl showing a cross.

The tower of the steeple is embedded to the facade and it has as ornamental elements rough columns, arches of half point, entablatures, and pinnacles, following the architectonic style of the temple. The high of the tower ends with a pointed dome.

The church possesses colonial images and parochial documents of the 18th century. This antique population, in remote ages, gives birth to an oriental region of the country called “hueytlato” or primitive Tula.
