= Technological University of El Salvador =

University in El Salvador

Technologic University of El Salvador
- Other names: La Tecno
- Motto: Lo que cuenta es tu Actitud Positiva
- Motto in English: What counts is your Positive Attitude
- Type: Private university
- Established: 12 June 1981; 45 years ago
- Rector: Nelsón Zárate Sánchez
- Students: ~23,000 (2014)
- Location: San Salvador, El Salvador; 13.7005°N 89.2017°W
- Colours
- Website: utec.edu.sv

The Technological University of El Salvador or Universidad Tecnológica de El Salvador, is a higher education center in El Salvador, known as UTEC or "la Tecno", owned by a private capital company. The university campus is located in San Salvador and has ten classroom buildings, an auditorium, a library, specialized laboratories, a cultural center, and computer centers, in addition to Radio UTEC (970 AM) and Tecnovisión (Channel 33).

== History ==
It was founded on June 12, 1981, by an agreement of the Ministry of Education, at the request of a group of citizens at the time when the University of El Salvador had been closed and occupied militarily. It was located in Chahín building, Rubén Darío street, San Salvador.

The construction of Simón Bolívar in 1986, and Francisco Morazán in 1987.

== Faculties ==
The university offers a wide range of careers from different faculties, in addition to having masters and postgraduate degrees.

=== Faculty of Business ===
- Bachelor of Business Administration
- Bachelor of Business Administration with Emphasis in Computing
- Bachelor of Tourism Business Administration
- Bachelor of Public Accounting
- Bachelor of Marketing
- Bachelor of International Business
- Bachelor of Business Administration with Emphasis in English
- Bachelor of Marketing with Emphasis in English
- Bachelor of Tourism Business Administration with Emphasis in English
- Tourist Administration Technician
- Marketing and Sales Technician

=== Faculty of Social Sciences ===
- Bachelor of English language
- Bachelor of Psychology
- Bachelor of Communications
- Bachelor of Communications with an emphasis in English
- Public Relations Technician

=== Law School ===
- Bachelor of Legal Sciences
- Faculty of Informatics and Applied Sciences
- Systems and Computer Engineering
- Industrial engineering
- Industrial Engineering with Emphasis on English
- Architecture
- Degree in computer science
- Bachelor of Graphic Design
- Technician in graphic design
- Computer Network Engineering Technician
- Software Engineering Technician

=== Faculty of Masters ===
- Master in Financial Administration
- Master in Business Administration
- Master in Banking and Finance
- Master in Business Administration No Face
- Master in Financial Management No Face-to-Face
- Master in Human Talent Management
- Master in Criminology
- Master in Forensic Auditing
- Master in Tax Audit
