= Judiciary of El Salvador =

The judiciary of El Salvador comprises a number of courts in a hierarchy. The highest court is the Supreme Court of El Salvador, consisting of 4 different chambers, 3 courts of appeal and a constitutional court. Below the Supreme Court are intermediate appeal courts, with cases heard by panels of three judges. Below them are the civil and criminal courts of first instance, with cases heard by one judge, but sentencing is carried out by three judges. At the lowest level are justices of the peace, dealing with cases involving smaller amounts of money or personal disputes. There is also a Supreme Court for elections.

== Reforms ==
Following the end of the Salvadoran Civil War, the Commission on the Truth for El Salvador and the Ad Hoc Commission identified weaknesses in the judiciary and recommended solutions, the most dramatic being the replacement of all the magistrates on the Supreme Court. This recommendation was fulfilled in 1994 when an entirely new court was elected, but weaknesses remain.

The process of replacing incompetent judges in the lower courts, and of strengthening the attorneys general's and public defender's offices, has moved more slowly. The government continues to work in all of these areas with the help of international donors, including the United States. Action on peace accord-driven constitutional reforms designed to improve the administration of justice was largely completed in 1996 with legislative approval of several amendments and the revision of the Criminal Procedure Code with broad political consensus.
