= Crime in El Salvador =

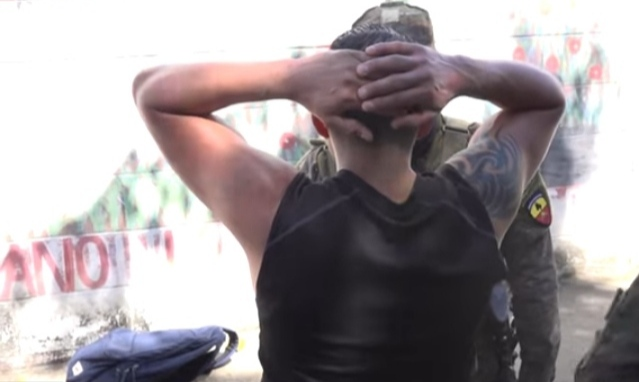
- Homicide: 1.3 (2025)
- Assault: 77.4 (2022)
- Burglary: 37.1 (2022)
- Theft: 146.0 (2022)
- Fraud: 101.4 (2022)
- Corruption: 0.9 (2022)
- Money laundering: 0.4 (2022)
- Rape: 43.6 (2022)
- Sexual violence: 107.3 (2022)
- reported per 100,000 inhabitants

Crime in El Salvador was historically high due to the presence of various gangs. In 2011, there were an estimated 25,000 gang members at large in El Salvador; with another 43,500 in prison. The best-known gangs, called maras in colloquial Salvadoran Spanish, are Mara Salvatrucha (MS-13) and their rivals 18th Street; maras are hunted by death squads, including Sombra Negra. Newer rivals include the rising mara, The Rebels 13.

The homicide rate in El Salvador has plummeted drastically since 2015. The Salvadoran gang crackdown, beginning in March 2022, has resulted in a sharp drop in crime and made El Salvador the safest country in Central America. The crackdown has also resulted in El Salvador having the highest incarceration rate in the world, at 1,086 people per 100,000 in 2023. In 2023, an estimated 1.6% of El Salvador's population was incarcerated.

== History of violence in El Salvador ==
Gang violence was a historic, extremely severe issue in El Salvador. The roots of gang violence arises from issues like social and economic inequality, and changes made during the Salvadoran Civil War. In the 1980s, the MS-13 and the Barrio 18 gangs were formed in Los Angeles. These gangs were created in the streets of Los Angeles by the refugees' children who were trying to escape the war that was happening in El Salvador.

After the Civil War in El Salvador, many people left for a better life away from war and fled to the United States, seeking asylum and Temporary Protected Status (TPS). This was all caused by the severe violence that Salvadorians were going through in their own country. TPS was given by the U.S. government in the 1990s, allowing them to stay in The United States for a short period of time while the Salvadoran Civil War was happening.

The Salvadoran Civil War, which lasted from 1979 to 1992, took the lives of approximately 80,000 soldiers and civilians in El Salvador. Throughout the war, nearly half of the country's population fled from violence and poverty. Children were recruited as soldiers by both the military-run government and the guerrilla group Farabundo Martí National Liberation Front (FMLN). Hundreds of thousands of Salvadorans relocated to Los Angeles, California. This conflict ended with the Chapultepec Peace Accords, but the violence in El Salvador has not stopped since.

Many of those who had relocated to Los Angeles during the war as refugees became involved in gang violence. During this time, the U.S. war on drugs and anti-immigrant politics had been popularized. Following these sentiments, the Illegal Immigration Reform and Immigrant Responsibility Act of 1996 was passed, which called for deportation of "immigrants--documented or undocumented--with criminal records at the end of their jail sentences". In the years following, thousands of Salvadorans were deported back to El Salvador. Gangs that had originated in Los Angeles, namely Mara Salvatrucha and Barrio 18, were spread transnationally through this process.

In 2012, El Salvador saw a 41% drop in crime compared to 2011 figures due to what the Salvadoran government called a gang truce. In early 2012, there were an average of 16 killings per day. In late March, that number dropped to fewer than five per day. On April 14, 2012, for the first time in over three years, there was a day with no killings in the country. There were 411 killings in January 2012. In March, the number was 188, more than a 40% reduction in crime. The truce ended in 2014, with the murder rate subsequently rising again.

=== El Salvador homicides ===
In recent years, the homicide rate of El Salvador has plummeted drastically, both before and since the 2022 Salvadoran gang crackdown. In 2024, El Salvador reported a homicide rate of 1.9 per 100,000 people, a figure lower than any other Latin American country. This rate represents a 98% decrease in nine years.

Homicides in El Salvador
Year	Rate per 100,000	Total
2015	106.3	6,656
2016	84.1	5,269
2017	83.0	3,962
2018	53.1	3,346
2019	38.0	2,398
2020	21.2	1,341
2021	18.1	1,147
2022	7.8	495
2023	2.4	154
2024	1.9	114
2025	1.3	82

== Gangs ==
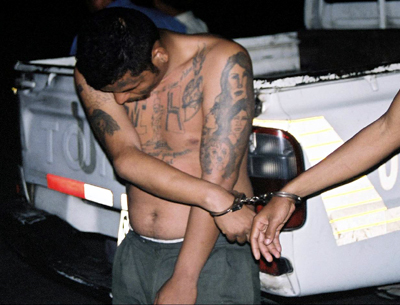
An MS-13 suspect bearing gang tattoos is handcuffed.

Mara 18 and MS-13 are the largest and most notorious in El Salvador. Mara 18 is also known as 18th Street and MS-13 as Mara Salvatrucha. 18th Street was formed in the 1960s by Mexican-American youth in the Rampart neighborhood of Los Angeles, California."

The MS-13 and Barrio 18 are involved in extortion, human trafficking, narco-activities, and violence.

=== Gangs and violence ===
Gangs contribute to the generally high levels of social violence in El Salvador. They engage in various serious criminal acts which terrorize and paralyze society. Homicide and extortion are the most publicized crimes. There are different forms of violence constructed in El Salvador such as political, gender, and structural violence. Women and children have been particular targets of violence, torture, and abuse. Gangs engage in sex trafficking in El Salvador as an alternative source of profit to drugs.

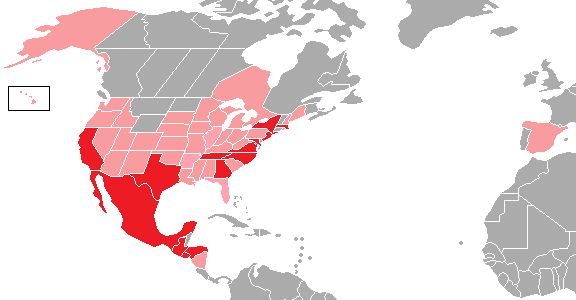
MS-13 presence – light-red indicates territories with a lighter presence, dark-red indicates territories with a strong presence.

=== Reasons for joining gangs ===
Criminal youth gangs dominate life in El Salvador; an estimation of at least 60,000 young people belong to gangs. Salvadoran young men decide to join a gang for several reasons. Sometimes this is understood as a choice, but other motivations include feeling neglected and abandoned by family or feeling they do not belong anywhere except where violence occurs. Juan Fogelbach argues that general risk factors associated with gang membership include: poverty, family disintegration or separation, neglect, violent domestic environments, unemployment, scarcity of educational and developmental opportunities, and family membership in gangs. The presence of one or more of these factors may compel an adolescent or child to turn to gangs in hope of finding a familial environment, social status, and economic opportunities. The average age for one to join a gang is between 10 and 14 years old.

=== Links to drug trafficking ===
MS-13 and Mara 18 have an unknown relationship with drug traffickers. El Salvador police report that traffickers cultivate ties and build alliances with gangs that eventually mature into international syndicates. The drug business has been growing with more gangs becoming involved with them and disputing over territory with the drug traffickers. In 2012, the United States was home to 10,000 members of the MS-13 gang who are involved with the transnational criminal networks of drugs, weapons, and violent gang culture.

=== Migration and displacement ===
One driving factor of immigration out of El Salvador has to do with gang violence. In 2022 about 69% of the Salvadoran migrants were found in the Rio Grande Valley, in Texas, crossing the border to the United States.

== Efforts to reduce violence ==
=== Government policy ===
The government has set up numerous programs to try to guide the youth away from gang membership. La Mano Dura was a form of zero tolerance policy, a strategy that had flowed into El Salvador from Los Angeles, which called for "the immediate imprisonment of a gang member simply for having gang-related tattoos or flashing gang signs in public." Before this policy was ruled unconstitutional, it put tens of thousands of gang members as young as 12 years old in jail between 2003 and 2004.

The Salvadoran government responded with the “Mano Dura” or Iron Fist policy. This has to do with aggressive mass arrests and the suspension of some constitutional rights. Despite these policies' purpose of decreasing the violence happening in El Salvador, they create judgment internationally because they violate the basic human rights of their citizens. The researcher Juan Pappier, saw that a usual approach in Latin America was to talk about the significant security challenges by restricting or suspending the citizens’ rights. This creates worries as the acts do not address the root issues like systemic inequalities or US deportation policy.

Following La Mano Dura was a government program called Super Mano Dura ("Super Firm Hand"). Super Mano Dura was highly criticized by the UN. According to the Salvadoran government, it saw temporary success in 2004 with a 14% drop in murders. This success dwindled beginning in the next year, and as of 2005, El Salvador had 65 homicides per 100000 inhabitants, more than triple the current rate of Mexico.

Recent efforts by mayor Norman Quijano to restore public safety have been somewhat successful. Security measures in San Salvador's most troubled Districts (5 and 6, which border Soyapango, and are home to many gangs) included safety campaigns and recreational activities to keep youth from joining gangs. The mayor also initiated a security camera program so the police can monitor the most heavily trafficked areas of the city. The project was launched in the historic downtown and will expand throughout the entire city.

In late April, President Nayib Bukele ordered that prisons containing gang members be placed on lockdown following a spate of violence between April 24 and April 27, 2020, that killed 77 people, which was blamed on gang members. As part of the Salvadoran government's crackdown, prisoners were locked in crowded cells for 23 hours a day; cells were barricaded with plywood and sheets of metal; mobile and wifi signals were blocked, and rival gang members were mixed together. Human Rights Watch has criticized the treatment of prisoners as humiliating, degrading, and endangering their health in the midst of the 2020 coronavirus pandemic. On 17 March 2026, the Legislative Assembly approved a constitutional amendment to permit life imprisonment for individuals convicted of murder, rape, or terrorism.

=== Gang truce ===
In March 2012, two of El Salvador's largest gangs, MS-13 and Barrio 18, established a truce. This truce was established as a collaborative effort with the Salvadoran government to attempt to reduce the number of gang related homicides. This truce received criticism because it has been seen as the Salvadoran government's forfeiting sovereignty to these gangs. In early 2012, there was an average of 16 killings per day, but in late March that number dropped to fewer than five per day, and on April 14, 2012, for the first time in over three years, there were no killings in the country. Overall, there were 411 killings in January 2012, but in March the number was 188, more than a 50% reduction. In March 2015, 481 people were murdered—roughly 16 people a day—as the gang truce collapsed. This murder rate was 52% higher than that of the same time period the prior year. There were also allegations that the police were involved in extrajudicial killings of alleged gang members, following the fracturing of gangs and a radicalization of the security forces in an attempt to tackle the gang problem after the 2012 truce collapsed. The year before, in 2014, several gangs had offered a new truce as "a second chance for the country to achieve peace." However, President Salvador Sánchez Cerén had rejected the gangs' offer.

The administration of President Cerén launched a crackdown on the security and public officials of the previous administration who were responsible for mediating and implementing the truce between the government and the crime groups. The crackdown is part of the government's mano dura or "iron fist" approach, which has been criticized for its indiscriminate use of force against predominantly young male targets, suspected to be gang members.

=== Non-government groups ===
In 1996, Homies Unidos was formed to prevent violence and gang-membership among youth in El Salvador. With a base in Los Angeles as well as within El Salvador, the organization also provides a link for deportees and for those with family split between the two areas. The organization helps navigate the complicated and dangerous gang geography of El Salvador for deportees and also provides programming and care for young people in both locations. The organization encourages employment, education, and physical and mental health and provides tools and resources for achieving these things, such as tattoo removal and job connections.

== Impact on youth ==
=== During the War ===
During the violent Salvadoran Civil War, children joined the fight for many reasons. Some were kidnapped and forced into the army, some others joined for the economic benefits while the country struggled through high rates of poverty. Family members had been killed or had fled the country, leaving the children alone with few other options other than joining the war effort. Even those who were not soldiers witnessed the brutal violence. Exposure to these traumatic events and the dislocation of families caused damaging psychological side effects from these traumatic exposures.

=== Gang involvement ===
Salvadoran youths join gangs for many reasons. Sometimes this is understood as a choice, but it can also be attributed to a feeling of neglect and abandonment from family as well as a normalization of violence in society. Juan Fogelbach argues that general risk factors associated with gang membership include poverty, family disintegration or separation, neglect, violent domestic environments, unemployment, scarcity of educational and developmental opportunities, and family membership in gangs. The presence of one or more of these factors may compel an adolescent or child to turn to gangs in hope of finding a familial environment, social status, and economic opportunities. These young people are often unable to find respect or validation in other forms, such as within families, community, work, or schools, and turn to violence to gain respect on the streets. Some of these young people grew up in Los Angeles as the children of war refugees, and experienced gang involvement there. Sent to El Salvador as deportees, these people now find community and protection in the familiar groups that have been brought to El Salvador from the U.S., like Mara Salvatrucha and Barrio 18.

Gang members are "jumped in," an initiation process through which they have to prove their loyalty by committing criminal acts such as murder, theft or violence. This can also involve being beaten by several other gang members at once, and female recruits often must choose between engaging in sexual acts with a large number of members, or be beaten. Youth gangs are a major source of concern for society.

=== Women in gangs ===
Though gangs are primarily male-dominated, young women in El Salvador are also involved. Being initiated into the gangs for young women often involves group beatings, like it does for males, but can also involve sexual assault by several of the male gang members. Mo Hume explains: "Because gangs believe women are less suspicious in the eyes of authorities, they are also often tasked with acting as drug 'mules,' smuggling illicit goods into jails, gathering intelligence on rival gangs, and carrying arms in public spaces".

=== Unaccompanied minors fleeing El Salvador ===
Young people are fleeing El Salvador to the United States, fearful of gang violence. Since the breakdown of the gang peace agreement in 2012, the number of these Unaccompanied Alien Children (UACs) encountered in the U.S. has risen dramatically. Between 2009 and 2012, less than 2,000 UACs were encountered annually. In the 2014 fiscal year, over 16,000 were encountered. The fiscal years 2012 through 2016 saw an average of nearly 8,000.

According to a report by the United Nations High Commissioner for Refugees, "Given the fundamental role played by the family in the protection, physical care and emotional well-being of its members, separation from families is particularly devastating for refugee children.

=== Asylum opportunities in other countries ===
The Temporary Protected Status (TPS) is a program that gives migrants from unsafe countries the opportunity to reside and work in the United States temporarily. The TPS was created in the 1990s and allowed for Salvadorians to temporarily remain in the US during and in the aftermath of the Salvadoran Civil War. Even though the people who had TPS were protected from being deported, this changed in 2018 when Trump became president changing the U.S. policies. In over 200 cases, there has been a connection that was identified between the violence or harm experienced by deportees upon their return to El Salvador and the main reasons why they left the country.

== Region specific ==
=== San Salvador ===
Concerns about public safety in the capital San Salvador increased in the late 1980s due to the civil war. Although it was fought primarily in the countryside, during the latter years of the war, guerrillas started attacking the capital city. San Salvador recovered quickly after the cessation of hostilities, but gang ("mara") violence became a problem.

The 18th Street gang, originating in Los Angeles, California, has proliferated in San Salvador as has the Mara Salvatrucha, a rival gang. In 2002, crime rates skyrocketed, and the municipal government was unable to combat the rise.

Recent efforts by mayor Norman Quijano to restore public safety have been somewhat successful. Security measures in San Salvador's most troubled Districts (5 and 6, which border Soyapango, and are home to many gangs) included safety campaigns and recreational activities to keep youth from joining gangs. The mayor also initiated a security camera program so the police can monitor the most heavily trafficked areas of the city. The project was launched in the historic downtown and will expand throughout the entire city.

As of 2011, San Salvador had managed to reduce its crime rate and reduce its murder rate to a level lower than that of Haiti, Venezuela, Mexico, Guatemala, or Honduras, although at over 90 murders per 100,000 residents, San Salvador's per capita rate was more than 10 times higher than that of major cities such as New York or London. Also, according to a UN Development report, San Salvador has a relatively low robbery rate of 90 per 100,000, compared to San José, the capital of Costa Rica, which has 524 robberies per 100,000.

Districts 3 and 4 are the safest in the country; their crime rates are comparable to those of European cities. Districts 1 and 2 have a slightly higher crime rate than 3 or 4, while District 5, bordering San Marcos, and District 6, bordering Soyapango, have the highest crime rates.

=== Homicide by municipality (2009–2014) ===
Homicide in Salvadoran cities (100,000+ population)
Municipality	Department	Population (2012)	Intentional homicides							Rates per 100,000 residents						
Municipality	Department	Population (2012)	2009	2010	2011	2012	2013	2014	Total	2009	2010	2011	2012	2013	2014	Total
San Salvador	San Salvador	287,629	301	245	277	157	216	337	1533	104.6	85.2	96.3	54.6	75.1	117.2	88.8
Soyapango	San Salvador	274,020	194	211	174	81	96	138	894	70.8	77.0	63.5	29.6	35.0	50.4	54.4
Santa Ana	Santa Ana	265,078	279	208	277	124	73	106	1067	105.3	78.5	104.5	46.8	27.5	40.0	67.1
San Miguel	San Miguel	246,224	245	202	196	111	79	90	923	99.5	82.0	79.6	45.1	32.1	36.6	62.5
Apopa	San Salvador	162,306	165	121	133	63	73	115	670	101.7	74.6	81.9	38.8	45.0	70.9	68.8
Mejicanos	San Salvador	148,727	120	92	87	51	91	111	552	80.7	61.9	58.5	34.3	61.2	74.6	61.9
Santa Tecla	La Libertad	135,155	35	26	53	23	17	21	175	25.9	19.2	39.2	17.0	12.6	15.5	21.6
Delgado	San Salvador	128,795	103	106	104	51	46	84	494	80.0	82.3	80.7	39.6	35.7	65.2	63.9
Ilopango	San Salvador	123,258	101	82	117	62	46	50	458	81.9	66.5	94.9	50.3	37.3	40.6	61.9
Tonacatepeque	San Salvador	121,307	98	77	81	36	21	45	358	80.8	63.5	66.8	29.7	17.3	37.1	49.2
Colón	La Libertad	121,022	172	143	100	62	62	98	637	142.1	118.2	82.6	51.2	51.2	81.0	87.7
Ahuachapan	Ahuachapan	121,000	45	43	42	34	27	23	214	37.2	35.5	34.7	28.1	22.3	19.0	29.5

Homicide in Salvadoran cities (50,000–99,999 population)
Municipality	Department	Population (2012)	Intentional homicides							Rates per 100,000 residents						
Municipality	Department	Population (2012)	2009	2010	2011	2012	2013	2014	Total	2009	2010	2011	2012	2013	2014	Total
San Martín	San Salvador	89,721	79	67	67	47	25	96	381	88.1	74.7	74.7	52.4	27.9	107.0	70.8
San Juan Opico	La Libertad	83,899	84	99	91	40	20	31	365	100.1	118.0	108.5	47.7	23.8	36.9	72.5
Chalchuapa	Santa Ana	81,059	66	67	46	41	39	67	326	81.4	82.7	56.7	50.6	48.1	82.7	67.0
Usulután	Usulután	77,985	47	52	54	43	36	58	290	60.3	66.7	69.2	55.1	46.2	74.4	62.0
Izalco	Sonsonate	77,779	39	52	57	46	35	68	297	50.1	66.9	73.3	59.1	45.0	87.4	63.6
Cuscatancingo	San Salvador	76,865	72	64	65	26	27	37	291	93.7	83.3	84.6	33.8	35.1	48.1	63.1
Sonsonate	Sonsonate	74,252	108	89	126	45	16	33	417	145.5	119.9	169.7	60.6	21.5	44.4	93.6
San Marcos	San Salvador	70,154	50	35	50	15	16	27	193	71.3	49.9	71.3	21.4	22.8	38.5	45.9
Zacatecoluca	La Paz	70,113	42	58	49	31	32	97	309	59.9	82.7	69.9	44.2	45.6	138.3	73.5
Ciudad Arce	La Libertad	69,251	62	62	36	20	13	18	211	89.5	89.5	52.0	28.9	18.8	26.0	50.8
Ilobasco	Cabañas	67,623	26	35	41	31	52	91	276	38.4	51.8	60.6	45.8	76.9	134.6	68.0
Metapán	Santa Ana	63,299	19	16	22	23	14	33	127	30.0	25.3	34.8	36.3	22.1	52.1	33.4
San Vicente	San Vicente	57,968	29	23	64	38	23	20	197	50.0	39.7	110.4	65.6	39.7	34.5	56.6
Quezaltepeque	La Libertad	57,301	91	55	63	34	36	57	336	158.8	96.0	109.9	59.3	62.8	99.5	97.7
Acajutla	Sonsonate	56,650	68	63	75	20	5	24	255	120.0	111.2	132.4	35.3	8.8	42.4	75.0
Cojutepeque	Cuscatlán	54,531	26	22	20	17	32	59	176	47.7	40.3	36.7	31.2	58.7	108.2	53.8
Nahuizalco	Sonsonate	54,318	44	54	43	31	35	50	257	81.0	99.4	79.2	57.1	64.4	92.1	78.9

Homicide in Salvadoran cities (10,000–49,999 population)
Municipality	Department	Population (2012)	Intentional homicides							Rates per 100,000 residents						
Municipality	Department	Population (2012)	2009	2010	2011	2012	2013	2014	Total	2009	2010	2011	2012	2013	2014	Total
Jiquilisco	Usulután	49,555	27	19	29	17	39	69	200	54.5	38.3	58.5	34.3	78.7	139.2	67.3
San Pedro Perulapán	Cuscatlán	49,342	20	38	33	30	36	84	241	40.5	77.0	66.9	60.8	73.0	170.2	81.4
San Francisco Menendez	Ahuachapan	45,972	30	10	21	9	13	28	111	65.3	21.8	45.7	19.6	28.3	60.9	40.2
Panchimalco	San Salvador	45,874	38	52	88	41	31	44	294	82.8	113.4	191.8	89.4	67.6	95.9	106.8
Santiago Nonualco	La Paz	43,371	19	18	15	18	39	47	156	43.8	41.5	34.6	41.5	89.9	108.4	59.9
Conchagua	La Unión	42,668	26	33	39	18	29	13	158	60.9	77.3	91.4	42.2	68.0	30.5	61.7
Ayutuxtepeque	San Salvador	42,171	21	40	45	23	13	10	152	49.8	94.9	106.7	54.5	30.8	23.7	60.1
Sensuntepeque	Cabañas	42,085	19	15	26	10	11	14	95	45.1	35.6	61.8	23.8	26.1	33.3	37.6
Antiguo Cuscatlán	La Libertad	40,436	10	5	15	3	3	7	43	24.7	12.4	37.1	7.4	7.4	17.3	17.7
La Libertad	La Libertad	39,790	28	37	54	24	1	11	155	70.4	93.0	135.7	60.3	2.5	27.6	64.9
Coatepeque	Santa Ana	38,662	32	32	27	15	16	21	143	82.8	82.8	69.8	38.8	41.4	54.3	61.6
Armenia	Sonsonate	38,007	56	47	49	16	39	43	250	147.3	123.7	128.9	42.1	102.6	113.1	109.6
La Unión	La Unión	35,938	18	29	34	31	32	25	169	50.1	80.7	94.6	86.3	89.0	69.6	78.4
Atiquizaya	Ahuachapan	34,815	36	31	25	19	17	19	147	103.4	89.0	71.8	54.6	48.8	54.6	70.4
Olocuilta	La Paz	34,774	11	35	34	10	19	17	126	31.6	100.6	97.8	28.8	54.6	48.9	60.4
San Antonio del Monte	Sonsonate	32,848	28	25	46	17	5	5	126	85.2	76.1	140.0	51.8	15.2	15.2	63.9
Nejapa	San Salvador	32,400	38	43	33	19	13	22	168	117.3	132.7	101.9	58.6	40.1	67.9	86.4
Tacuba	Ahuachapan	32,189	14	17	14	7	9	16	77	43.5	52.8	43.5	21.7	28.0	49.7	39.9
Sonzacate	Sonsonate	31,951	26	22	28	14	2	7	99	81.4	68.9	87.6	43.8	6.3	21.9	51.6
Santa Rosa de Lima	La Unión	30,537	23	16	29	21	9	11	109	75.3	52.4	95.0	68.8	29.5	36.0	59.5
Jujutla	Ahuachapan	30,371	13	18	15	10	12	12	80	42.8	59.3	49.4	32.9	39.5	39.5	43.9
Chalatenango	Chalatenango	30,153	11	12	9	8	3	13	56	36.5	39.8	29.8	26.5	9.9	43.1	31.0
Nueva Concepción	Chalatenango	29,671	15	25	27	14	7	12	100	50.6	84.3	91.0	47.2	23.6	40.4	56.2
Santo Tomás	San Salvador	28,617	19	19	27	21	13	22	121	66.4	66.4	94.3	73.4	45.4	76.9	70.5
Zaragoza	La Libertad	28,584	22	15	13	11	12	24	97	77.0	52.5	45.5	38.5	42.0	84.0	56.6
San Pedro Masahuat	La Paz	28,449	25	19	27	28	22	14	135	87.9	66.8	94.9	98.4	77.3	49.2	79.1
Ciudad Barrios	San Miguel	27,503	17	24	26	19	10	27	123	61.8	87.3	94.5	69.1	36.4	98.2	74.5
San Luis Talpa	La Paz	26,839	9	20	22	18	19	23	111	33.5	74.5	82.0	67.1	70.8	85.7	68.9
El Congo	Santa Ana	26,810	17	13	14	13	9	13	79	63.4	48.5	52.2	48.5	33.6	48.5	49.1
Juayúa	Sonsonate	25,879	24	12	22	11	14	15	98	92.7	46.4	85.0	42.5	54.1	58.0	63.1
Tecoluca	San Vicente	25,729	34	10	31	23	33	34	165	132.1	38.9	120.5	89.4	128.3	132.1	106.9
Guazapa	San Salvador	25,705	26	30	40	22	19	23	160	101.1	116.7	155.6	85.6	73.9	89.5	103.7
Candelaria de la Frontera	Santa Ana	25,236	15	8	13	9	9	5	59	59.4	31.7	51.5	35.7	35.7	19.8	39.0
Moncagua	San Miguel	25,083	9	12	9	9	5	11	55	35.9	47.8	35.9	35.9	19.9	43.9	36.5
San Francisco Gotera	Morazán	24,615	6	7	16	8	6	12	55	24.4	28.4	65.0	32.5	24.4	48.8	37.2
Suchitoto	Cuscatlán	24,542	17	24	14	9	18	29	111	69.3	97.8	57.0	36.7	73.3	118.2	75.4
San Sebastián Salitrillo	Santa Ana	23,749	25	29	30	18	12	10	124	105.3	122.1	126.3	75.8	50.5	42.1	87.0
Aguilares	San Salvador	23,405	17	26	37	9	11	13	113	72.6	111.1	158.1	38.5	47.0	55.5	80.5
Chinameca	San Miguel	23,224	8	7	10	2	13	22	62	34.4	30.1	43.1	8.6	56.0	94.7	44.5
San Luis la Herradura	La Paz	22,489	5	5	22	13	21	19	85	22.2	22.2	97.8	57.8	93.4	84.5	63.0
San Pablo Tacachico	La Libertad	21,924	4	6	12	10	2	23	57	18.2	27.4	54.7	45.6	9.1	104.9	43.3
Santiago Texacuangos	San Salvador	21,654	15	6	10	8	15	20	74	69.3	27.7	46.2	36.9	69.3	92.4	57.0
Chirilagua	San Miguel	20,669	15	16	11	11	12	14	79	72.6	77.4	53.2	53.2	58.1	67.7	63.7
Guaymango	Ahuachapan	20,244	2	4	2	4	2	3	17	9.9	19.8	9.9	19.8	9.9	14.8	14.0
San Julián	Sonsonate	20,173	4	3	9	5	3	18	42	19.8	14.9	44.6	24.8	14.9	89.2	34.7
El Rosario	La Paz	20,161	8	9	15	9	12	7	60	39.7	44.6	74.4	44.6	59.5	34.7	49.6
Apastepeque	San Vicente	19,946	3	8	7	6	4	11	39	15.0	40.1	35.1	30.1	20.1	55.1	32.6
El Tránsito	San Miguel	19,777	10	7	13	10	3	6	49	50.6	35.4	65.7	50.6	15.2	30.3	41.3
San Rafael Cedros	Cuscatlán	19,432	6	10	12	5	6	4	43	30.9	51.5	61.8	25.7	30.9	20.6	36.9
Jucuapa	Usulután	19,334	7	9	8	10	16	24	74	36.2	46.6	41.4	51.7	82.8	124.1	63.8
Santiago de María	Usulután	18,846	6	2	14	8	8	25	63	31.8	10.6	74.3	42.4	42.4	132.7	55.7
San Juan Nonualco	La Paz	18,750	4	6	11	7	0	21	49	21.3	32.0	58.7	37.3	0.0	112.0	43.6
Texistepeque	Santa Ana	18,570	1	7	6	5	3	0	22	5.4	37.7	32.3	26.9	16.2	0.0	19.7
Puerto el Triunfo	Usulután	18,536	14	2	8	8	9	16	57	75.5	10.8	43.2	43.2	48.6	86.3	51.3
San Alejo	La Unión	18,037	4	3	9	5	12	14	47	22.2	16.6	49.9	27.7	66.5	77.6	43.4
Santa Elena	Usulután	17,920	10	2	3	6	4	16	41	55.8	11.2	16.7	33.5	22.3	89.3	38.1
Berlín	Usulután	17,296	3	3	2	1	3	1	13	17.3	17.3	11.6	5.8	17.3	5.8	12.5
Pasaquina	La Unión	16,933	6	6	13	7	6	6	44	35.4	35.4	76.8	41.3	35.4	35.4	43.3
Corinto	Morazán	16,763	5	9	11	7	10	5	47	29.8	53.7	65.6	41.8	59.7	29.8	46.7
San José Villanueva	La Libertad	16,608	4	12	7	2	7	21	53	24.1	72.3	42.1	12.0	42.1	126.4	53.2
Huizúcar	La Libertad	16,228	11	5	6	6	1	18	47	67.8	30.8	37.0	37.0	6.2	110.9	48.3
Lolotique	San Miguel	16,026	2	2	4	6	3	12	29	12.5	12.5	25.0	37.4	18.7	74.9	30.2
Tepecoyo	La Libertad	15,649	8	7	5	3	4	2	29	51.1	44.7	32.0	19.2	25.6	12.8	30.9
Anamorós	La Unión	15,467	1	10	1	6	3	2	23	6.5	64.7	6.5	38.8	19.4	12.9	24.8
San Sebastián	San Vicente	15,279	22	10	10	6	7	3	58	144.0	65.4	65.4	39.3	45.8	19.6	63.3
Tamanique	La Libertad	15,190	6	14	11	5	1	3	40	39.5	92.2	72.4	32.9	6.6	19.7	43.9
El Paísnal	San Salvador	15,077	11	6	13	10	9	31	80	73.0	39.8	86.2	66.3	59.7	205.6	88.4
Lislique	La Unión	14,897	5	1	2	2	5	2	17	33.6	6.7	13.4	13.4	33.6	13.4	19.0
El Carmen	Cuscatlán	14,801	4	2	2	3	8	35	54	27.0	13.5	13.5	20.3	54.1	236.5	60.8
Sacacoyo	La Libertad	14,336	39	37	23	3	3	3	108	272.0	258.1	160.4	20.9	20.9	20.9	125.6
Tejutla	Chalatenango	14,135	14	17	6	3	11	22	73	99.0	120.3	42.4	21.2	77.8	155.6	86.1
San Rafael (Oriente)	San Miguel	14,095	4	2	3	1	3	8	21	28.4	14.2	21.3	7.1	21.3	56.8	24.8
Cuisnahuat	Sonsonate	14,027	5	1	5	1	3	2	17	35.6	7.1	35.6	7.1	21.4	14.3	20.2
Mercedes Umaña	Usulután	13,709	7	4	2	5	2	15	35	51.1	29.2	14.6	36.5	14.6	109.4	42.6
Santa Cruz Michapa	Cuscatlán	13,527	6	2	4	6	16	28	62	44.4	14.8	29.6	44.4	118.3	207.0	76.4
Rosario de Mora	San Salvador	13,345	19	21	2	9	4	12	67	142.4	157.4	15.0	67.4	30.0	89.9	83.7
Jucuarán	Usulután	13,130	7	2	3	2	9	10	33	53.3	15.2	22.8	15.2	68.5	76.2	41.9
Teotepeque	La Libertad	13,100	2	2	3	6	2	1	16	15.3	15.3	22.9	45.8	15.3	7.6	20.4
Guatajiagua	Morazán	12,991	2	2	4	8	2	7	25	15.4	15.4	30.8	61.6	15.4	53.9	32.1
El Carmen	La Unión	12,988	7	1	3	11	8	3	33	53.9	7.7	23.1	84.7	61.6	23.1	42.3
Concepción de Ataco	Ahuachapan	12,969	3	1	4	1	2	2	13	23.1	7.7	30.8	7.7	15.4	15.4	16.7
La Palma	Chalatenango	12,967	1	6	5	3	1	2	18	7.7	46.3	38.6	23.1	7.7	15.4	23.1
Ozatlán	Usulután	12,811	1	3	7	4	13	10	38	7.8	23.4	54.6	31.2	101.5	78.1	49.4
Victoria	Cabañas	12,779	4	0	3	1	3	4	15	31.3	0.0	23.5	7.8	23.5	31.3	19.6
Comasagua	La Libertad	12,496	8	2	2	4	5	5	26	64.0	16.0	16.0	32.0	40.0	40.0	34.7
Concepción Batres	Usulután	12,386	2	4	7	7	8	19	47	16.1	32.3	56.5	56.5	64.6	153.4	63.2
Santa María	Usulután	12,261	9	11	20	11	4	12	67	73.4	89.7	163.1	89.7	32.6	97.9	91.1
Alegría	Usulután	12,166	7	6	0	7	3	11	34	57.5	49.3	0.0	57.5	24.7	90.4	46.6
Sociedad	Morazán	12,082	4	8	1	7	4	4	28	33.1	66.2	8.3	57.9	33.1	33.1	38.6
San Simón	Morazán	11,874	0	0	0	0	0	3	3	0.0	0.0	0.0	0.0	0.0	25.3	4.2
El Paraíso	Chalatenango	11,811	6	4	9	9	6	8	42	50.8	33.9	76.2	76.2	50.8	67.7	59.3
Jayaque	La Libertad	11,794	20	14	11	6	12	4	67	169.6	118.7	93.3	50.9	101.7	33.9	94.7
Chiltiupán	La Libertad	11,710	6	6	5	4	1	2	24	51.2	51.2	42.7	34.2	8.5	17.1	34.2
Nahulingo	Sonsonate	11,621	33	23	30	17	4	11	118	284.0	197.9	258.2	146.3	34.4	94.7	169.2
Cacaopera	Morazán	11,507	2	1	4	4	2	3	16	17.4	8.7	34.8	34.8	17.4	26.1	23.2
Chapeltique	San Miguel	11,349	4	2	9	9	4	4	32	35.2	17.6	79.3	79.3	35.2	35.2	47.0
Santa Catarina Masahuat	Sonsonate	11,148	4	2	1	6	1	1	15	35.9	17.9	9.0	53.8	9.0	9.0	22.4
Monte San Juan	Cuscatlán	11,054	5	2	4	3	2	11	27	45.2	18.1	36.2	27.1	18.1	99.5	40.7
Santa Isabel Ishuatán	Sonsonate	10,970	3	2	1	3	3	4	16	27.3	18.2	9.1	27.3	27.3	36.5	24.3
Chilanga	Morazán	10,901	2	1	1	0	1	0	5	18.3	9.2	9.2	0.0	9.2	0.0	7.6
Jocoro	Morazán	10,868	5	3	6	0	4	3	21	46.0	27.6	55.2	0.0	36.8	27.6	32.2
San Rafael Obrajuelo	La Paz	10,818	14	1	4	4	8	11	42	129.4	9.2	37.0	37.0	74.0	101.7	64.7
Candelaría	Cuscatlán	10,766	3	2	3	1	0	3	12	27.9	18.6	27.9	9.3	0.0	27.9	18.6
Sesori	San Miguel	10,696	1	3	0	1	1	0	6	9.3	28.0	0.0	9.3	9.3	0.0	9.3
Polorós	La Unión	10,410	2	6	8	5	3	1	25	19.2	57.6	76.8	48.0	28.8	9.6	40.0
Nueva Guadalupe	San Miguel	10,152	5	0	1	4	1	7	18	49.3	0.0	9.9	39.4	9.9	69.0	29.6
Caluco	Sonsonate	10,139	2	3	2	4	14	14	39	19.7	29.6	19.7	39.5	138.1	138.1	64.1
Turin	Ahuachapan	10,117	2	4	11	8	4	7	36	19.8	39.5	108.7	79.1	39.5	69.2	59.3
Nueva Esparta	La Unión	10,068	1	2	2	2	1	3	11	9.9	19.9	19.9	19.9	9.9	29.8	18.2
Osicala	Morazán	10,050	0	0	0	3	3	0	6	0.0	0.0	0.0	29.9	29.9	0.0	10.0

Homicide in Salvadoran cities (0–9,999 population)
Municipality	Department	Population (2012)	Intentional homicides							Rates per 100,000 residents						
Municipality	Department	Population (2012)	2009	2010	2011	2012	2013	2014	Total	2009	2010	2011	2012	2013	2014	Total
San Lorenzo	Ahuachapan	9,914	4	5	0	2	0	9	20	40.3	50.4	0.0	20.2	0.0	90.8	33.6
El Refugio	Ahuachapan	9,893	4	7	3	1	5	8	28	40.4	70.8	30.3	10.1	50.5	80.9	47.2
La Reina	Chalatenango	9,836	1	0	1	3	0	7	12	10.2	0.0	10.2	30.5	0.0	71.2	20.3
San Jorge	San Miguel	9,609	1	1	2	2	2	3	11	10.4	10.4	20.8	20.8	20.8	31.2	19.1
San Pedro Nonualco	La Paz	9,583	3	3	4	1	3	5	19	31.3	31.3	41.7	10.4	31.3	52.2	33.0
San José Guayabal	Cuscatlán	9,342	2	2	0	4	4	9	21	21.4	21.4	0.0	42.8	42.8	96.3	37.5
San Ignacio	Chalatenango	9,241	4	4	0	0	0	1	9	43.3	43.3	0.0	0.0	0.0	10.8	16.2
Talnique	La Libertad	9,200	19	22	10	2	2	2	57	206.5	239.1	108.7	21.7	21.7	21.7	103.3
San Cristóbal	Cuscatlán	9,153	0	1	2	0	2	2	7	0.0	10.9	21.9	0.0	21.9	21.9	12.7
El Porvenir	Santa Ana	9,141	10	5	9	11	2	4	41	109.4	54.7	98.5	120.3	21.9	43.8	74.8
Estanzuelas	Usulután	9,123	1	4	2	6	4	3	20	11.0	43.8	21.9	65.8	43.8	32.9	36.5
San Bartolomé Perulapía	Cuscatlán	9,017	8	9	10	5	5	6	43	88.7	99.8	110.9	55.5	55.5	66.5	79.5
Concepción de Oriente	La Unión	8,863	2	5	1	5	2	31	46	22.6	56.4	11.3	56.4	22.6	349.8	86.5
Carolina	San Miguel	8,753	4	4	3	3	3	3	20	45.7	45.7	34.3	34.3	34.3	34.3	38.1
Apaneca	Ahuachapan	8,497	4	6	1	1	2	1	15	47.1	70.6	11.8	11.8	23.5	11.8	29.4
Meanguera	Morazán	8,451	0	1	0	0	0	0	1	0.0	11.8	0.0	0.0	0.0	0.0	2.0
Agua Caliente	Chalatenango	8,365	5	4	3	1	1	9	23	59.8	47.8	35.9	12.0	12.0	107.6	45.8
El Divisadero	Morazán	8,295	2	0	1	3	0	0	6	24.1	0.0	12.1	36.2	0.0	0.0	12.1
Intipucá	La Unión	8,215	6	2	8	6	3	5	30	73.0	24.3	97.4	73.0	36.5	60.9	60.9
San Juan Talpa	La Paz	8,213	8	8	7	2	5	3	33	97.4	97.4	85.2	24.4	60.9	36.5	67.0
San Pedro Puxtla	Ahuachapan	8,208	1	2	3	2	2	2	12	12.2	24.4	36.5	24.4	24.4	24.4	24.4
Nuevo Cuscatlán	La Libertad	8,144	5	4	0	4	19	1	33	61.4	49.1	0.0	49.1	233.3	12.3	67.5
San Ildefonso	San Vicente	8,121	5	1	2	1	0	1	10	61.6	12.3	24.6	12.3	0.0	12.3	20.5
San Francisco Chinameca	La Paz	7,962	0	0	2	2	6	6	16	0.0	0.0	25.1	25.1	75.4	75.4	33.5
Isidro	Cabañas	7,950	3	8	6	6	2	2	27	37.7	100.6	75.5	75.5	25.2	25.2	56.6
Tecapán	Usulután	7,864	3	2	1	0	3	10	19	38.1	25.4	12.7	0.0	38.1	127.2	40.3
San Matías	La Libertad	7,822	10	4	5	2	5	11	37	127.8	51.1	63.9	25.6	63.9	140.6	78.8
Nueva Granada	Usulután	7,814	1	2	2	0	1	6	12	12.8	25.6	25.6	0.0	12.8	76.8	25.6
Yayantique	La Unión	7,736	4	3	7	3	1	2	20	51.7	38.8	90.5	38.8	12.9	25.9	43.1
Tejutepeque	Cabañas	7,687	6	4	0	4	10	8	32	78.1	52.0	0.0	52.0	130.1	104.1	69.4
Santo Domingo de Guzmán	Sonsonate	7,613	6	0	10	0	0	1	17	78.8	0.0	131.4	0.0	0.0	13.1	37.2
El Triunfo	Usulután	7,467	2	2	4	4	3	3	18	26.8	26.8	53.6	53.6	40.2	40.2	40.2
Santo Domingo	San Vicente	7,256	5	4	9	5	1	0	24	68.9	55.1	124.0	68.9	13.8	0.0	55.1
Yucuaiquín	La Unión	7,129	5	2	2	0	0	3	12	70.1	28.1	28.1	0.0	0.0	42.1	28.1
San Ramón	Cuscatlán	6,948	3	2	0	0	3	4	12	43.2	28.8	0.0	0.0	43.2	57.6	28.8
Verapaz	San Vicente	6,813	4	1	1	2	1	1	10	58.7	14.7	14.7	29.4	14.7	14.7	24.5
Tenancingo	Cuscatlán	6,648	5	0	5	4	5	6	25	75.2	0.0	75.2	60.2	75.2	90.3	62.7
Concepción Quezaltepeque	Chalatenango	6,606	2	0	1	0	5	0	8	30.3	0.0	15.1	0.0	75.7	0.0	20.2
San Lorenzo	San Vicente	6,603	1	3	1	0	2	2	9	15.1	45.4	15.1	0.0	30.3	30.3	22.7
Dolores	Cabañas	6,573	0	1	1	5	3	1	11	0.0	15.2	15.2	76.1	45.6	15.2	27.9
El Sauce	La Unión	6,566	3	0	0	4	2	2	11	45.7	0.0	0.0	60.9	30.5	30.5	27.9
Jutiapa	Cabañas	6,472	1	2	2	0	2	1	8	15.5	30.9	30.9	0.0	30.9	15.5	20.6
Cuyultitán	La Paz	6,443	3	3	3	4	2	4	19	46.6	46.6	46.6	62.1	31.0	62.1	49.1
Santa Rita	Chalatenango	6,423	1	2	0	2	4	1	10	15.6	31.1	0.0	31.1	62.3	15.6	25.9
Guacotecti	Cabañas	6,268	7	2	4	4	2	5	24	111.7	31.9	63.8	63.8	31.9	79.8	63.8
Santa María Ostuma	La Paz	6,264	1	1	0	2	0	9	13	16.0	16.0	0.0	31.9	0.0	143.7	34.6
Ereguayquín	Usulután	6,193	0	1	2	3	6	7	19	0.0	16.1	32.3	48.4	96.9	113.0	51.1
San Agustín	Usulután	6,110	1	0	0	1	0	2	4	16.4	0.0	0.0	16.4	0.0	32.7	10.9
Salcoatitán	Sonsonate	6,097	10	6	0	3	1	3	23	164.0	98.4	0.0	49.2	16.4	49.2	62.9
San Gerardo	San Miguel	5,996	0	2	0	0	1	1	4	0.0	33.4	0.0	0.0	16.7	16.7	11.1
Guadalupe	San Vicente	5,992	0	2	0	3	1	2	8	0.0	33.4	0.0	50.1	16.7	33.4	22.3
San Estebán Catarina	San Vicente	5,935	0	0	3	1	0	3	7	0.0	0.0	50.5	16.8	0.0	50.5	19.7
San Cayetano Istepeque	San Vicente	5,738	1	0	2	0	0	1	4	17.4	0.0	34.9	0.0	0.0	17.4	11.6
San Luis de la Reina	San Miguel	5,715	2	2	1	1	0	4	10	35.0	35.0	17.5	17.5	0.0	70.0	29.2
Jicalapa	La Libertad	5,666	1	1	0	0	7	2	11	17.6	17.6	0.0	0.0	123.5	35.3	32.4
Delicias de Concepción	Morazán	5,653	0	2	1	1	1	1	6	0.0	35.4	17.7	17.7	17.7	17.7	17.7
San Antonio	San Miguel	5,632	0	0	1	1	1	1	4	0.0	0.0	17.8	17.8	17.8	17.8	11.8
San Miguel Tepezontes	La Paz	5,549	1	0	1	1	0	2	5	18.0	0.0	18.0	18.0	0.0	36.0	15.0
Santa Clara	San Vicente	5,547	2	4	7	1	3	2	19	36.1	72.1	126.2	18.0	54.1	36.1	57.1
Lolotiquillo	Morazán	5,481	1	0	0	0	2	1	4	18.2	0.0	0.0	0.0	36.5	18.2	12.2
Santiago de la Frontera	Santa Ana	5,412	2	0	0	0	1	1	4	37.0	0.0	0.0	0.0	18.5	18.5	12.3
San Francisco Javier	Usulután	5,241	1	3	2	1	2	1	10	19.1	57.2	38.2	19.1	38.2	19.1	31.8
San Dionisio	Usulután	5,222	2	4	0	4	3	14	27	38.3	76.6	0.0	76.6	57.4	268.1	86.2
Santa Rosa Guachipilín	Santa Ana	5,047	1	1	3	1	0	1	7	19.8	19.8	59.4	19.8	0.0	19.8	23.1
Dulce Nombre de María	Chalatenango	4,971	1	0	0	0	1	1	3	20.1	0.0	0.0	0.0	20.1	20.1	10.1
San Carlos	Morazán	4,958	1	0	0	0	1	1	3	20.2	0.0	0.0	0.0	20.2	20.2	10.1
Yamabal	Morazán	4,835	3	1	4	0	1	0	9	62.0	20.7	82.7	0.0	20.7	0.0	31.0
San Buenaventura	Usulután	4,771	4	2	1	0	0	8	15	83.8	41.9	21.0	0.0	0.0	167.7	52.4
El Rosario	Cuscatlán	4,625	0	0	0	2	5	3	10	0.0	0.0	0.0	43.2	108.1	64.9	36.0
Joateca	Morazán	4,566	0	0	1	1	0	0	2	0.0	0.0	21.9	21.9	0.0	0.0	7.3
San Antonio Masahuat	La Paz	4,463	0	1	1	0	0	1	3	0.0	22.4	22.4	0.0	0.0	22.4	11.2
Nombre de Jesús	Chalatenango	4,431	3	0	0	0	0	2	5	67.7	0.0	0.0	0.0	0.0	45.1	18.8
Bolívar	La Unión	4,360	5	1	1	3	3	4	17	114.7	22.9	22.9	68.8	68.8	91.7	65.0
San Rafael	Chalatenango	4,330	0	2	1	1	0	1	5	0.0	46.2	23.1	23.1	0.0	23.1	19.2
Quelepa	San Miguel	4,268	3	2	3	1	0	1	10	70.3	46.9	70.3	23.4	0.0	23.4	39.1
Gualococti	Morazán	4,124	0	0	0	0	0	1	1	0.0	0.0	0.0	0.0	0.0	24.2	4.0
Citalá	Chalatenango	4,074	0	4	1	0	2	3	10	0.0	98.2	24.5	0.0	49.1	73.6	40.9
Nuevo Edén de San Juan	San Miguel	4,044	0	0	0	0	0	0	0	0.0	0.0	0.0	0.0	0.0	0.0	0.0
Tepetitán	San Vicente	4,034	2	0	1	0	2	2	7	49.6	0.0	24.8	0.0	49.6	49.6	28.9
Tapalhuaca	La Paz	4,003	3	1	2	4	2	2	14	74.9	25.0	50.0	99.9	50.0	50.0	58.3
San Francisco Morazán	Chalatenango	3,975	0	0	1	3	1	2	7	0.0	0.0	25.2	75.5	25.2	50.3	29.4
Yoloaiquín	Morazán	3,951	0	1	1	0	2	1	5	0.0	25.3	25.3	0.0	50.6	25.3	21.1
La Laguna	Chalatenango	3,947	0	1	0	0	4	1	6	0.0	25.3	0.0	0.0	101.3	25.3	25.3
Oratorio de Concepción	Cuscatlán	3,873	0	2	2	2	2	2	10	0.0	51.6	51.6	51.6	51.6	51.6	43.0
San Juan Tepezontes	La Paz	3,846	0	0	1	0	0	1	2	0.0	0.0	26.0	0.0	0.0	26.0	8.7
Ojos de Agua	Chalatenango	3,683	2	1	0	0	0	1	4	54.3	27.2	0.0	0.0	0.0	27.2	18.1
Perquín	Morazán	3,493	1	0	3	0	0	0	4	28.6	0.0	85.9	0.0	0.0	0.0	19.1
Masahuat	Santa Ana	3,473	0	0	0	0	1	0	1	0.0	0.0	0.0	0.0	28.8	0.0	4.8
Uluazapa	San Miguel	3,462	0	0	0	0	2	2	4	0.0	0.0	0.0	0.0	57.8	57.8	19.3
San Antonio Pajonal	Santa Ana	3,341	1	0	0	0	1	1	3	29.9	0.0	0.0	0.0	29.9	29.9	15.0
Comacarán	San Miguel	3,257	1	2	1	1	3	1	9	30.7	61.4	30.7	30.7	92.1	30.7	46.1
Torola	Morazán	3,228	1	2	3	1	0	1	8	31.0	62.0	92.9	31.0	0.0	31.0	41.3
San Isidro	Morazán	3,175	1	1	0	0	1	1	4	31.5	31.5	0.0	0.0	31.5	31.5	21.0
Sensembra	Morazán	3,165	1	0	0	0	1	1	3	31.6	0.0	0.0	0.0	31.6	31.6	15.8
San José	La Unión	3,091	2	0	3	0	0	0	5	64.7	0.0	97.1	0.0	0.0	0.0	27.0
San Emigdio	La Paz	3,073	1	1	1	1	0	2	6	32.5	32.5	32.5	32.5	0.0	65.1	32.5
Jocoaitique	Morazán	2,934	1	0	0	7	0	0	8	34.1	0.0	0.0	238.6	0.0	0.0	45.4
Paraiso de Osorio	La Paz	2,927	0	0	0	1	0	2	3	0.0	0.0	0.0	34.2	0.0	68.3	17.1
Comalapa	Chalatenango	2,881	1	3	1	0	2	0	7	34.7	104.1	34.7	0.0	69.4	0.0	40.5
Jerusalén	La Paz	2,803	0	0	0	1	1	1	3	0.0	0.0	0.0	35.7	35.7	35.7	17.8
Santa Cruz Analquito	Cuscatlán	2,780	0	2	0	0	2	8	12	0.0	71.9	0.0	0.0	71.9	287.8	71.9
California	Usulután	2,755	0	0	0	0	1	0	1	0.0	0.0	0.0	0.0	36.3	0.0	6.0
San Fernando	Chalatenango	2,740	0	0	0	0	0	0	0	0.0	0.0	0.0	0.0	0.0	0.0	0.0
Arcatao	Chalatenango	2,698	0	0	1	2	2	0	5	0.0	0.0	37.1	74.1	74.1	0.0	30.9
San Isidro Labrador	Chalatenango	2,603	0	0	0	0	0	1	1	0.0	0.0	0.0	0.0	0.0	38.4	6.4
Meanguera del Golfo	La Unión	2,584	2	1	2	0	1	0	6	77.4	38.7	77.4	0.0	38.7	0.0	38.7
San Miguel de Mercedes	Chalatenango	2,493	0	1	0	1	1	1	4	0.0	40.1	0.0	40.1	40.1	40.1	26.7
El Carrizal	Chalatenango	2,447	1	0	0	0	1	0	2	40.9	0.0	0.0	0.0	40.9	0.0	13.6
San Fernando	Morazán	1,920	0	0	0	2	0	0	2	0.0	0.0	0.0	104.2	0.0	0.0	17.4
Arambala	Morazán	1,826	0	1	0	0	0	0	1	0.0	54.8	0.0	0.0	0.0	0.0	9.1
San Antonio de la Cruz	Chalatenango	1,742	2	2	0	0	0	0	4	114.8	114.8	0.0	0.0	0.0	0.0	38.3
Cancasque	Chalatenango	1,622	0	0	0	0	0	0	0	0.0	0.0	0.0	0.0	0.0	0.0	0.0
San Antonio los Ranchos	Chalatenango	1,602	0	1	0	2	0	0	3	0.0	62.4	0.0	124.8	0.0	0.0	31.2
Nueva Trinidad	Chalatenango	1,468	0	1	0	1	0	0	2	0.0	68.1	0.0	68.1	0.0	0.0	22.7
Potonico	Chalatenango	1,429	0	0	0	0	0	0	0	0.0	0.0	0.0	0.0	0.0	0.0	0.0
Cinquera	Cabañas	1,423	1	4	0	1	0	0	6	70.3	281.1	0.0	70.3	0.0	0.0	70.3
Las Flores	Chalatenango	1,413	0	0	0	0	0	0	0	0.0	0.0	0.0	0.0	0.0	0.0	0.0
El Rosario	Morazán	1,338	0	0	0	0	0	0	0	0.0	0.0	0.0	0.0	0.0	0.0	0.0
Azacualpa	Chalatenango	1,080	2	0	0	0	0	0	2	185.2	0.0	0.0	0.0	0.0	0.0	30.9
San Luis del Carmen	Chalatenango	1,061	0	0	0	0	1	3	4	0.0	0.0	0.0	0.0	94.3	282.8	62.8
San Francisco Lempa	Chalatenango	832	0	0	0	0	0	2	2	0.0	0.0	0.0	0.0	0.0	240.4	40.1
Las Vueltas	Chalatenango	787	0	0	0	1	1	0	2	0.0	0.0	0.0	127.1	127.1	0.0	42.4
Mercedes la Ceiba	La Paz	664	0	1	0	0	0	1	2	0.0	150.6	0.0	0.0	0.0	150.6	50.2

== See also ==
- Human trafficking in El Salvador
- Illegal drug trade in El Salvador
