= Human rights in El Salvador =

There have been persistent concerns over human rights in El Salvador. Some of these date from the civil war of 1980–92. More recent concerns have been raised by Amnesty International and Human Rights Watch. They include women's rights, child labor, and unlawful killings and harassment of labor union members and other social activists. The gang crackdown has been criticized for its impact on human rights and has led El Salvador to have the highest incarceration rate.

== History ==
La Matanza was a suppression of a 1932 peasant uprising which resulted in the death of tens of thousands of civilians and ethnic genocide of indigenous Salvadorans.

=== Salvadoran Civil War ===
Human rights abuses were rampant during the decade-plus Salvadoran Civil War, including El Mozote Massacres, the murder of Archbishop Óscar Romero in 1980, the Zona Rosa attacks, and the 1989 murders of six Jesuit priests. Human rights abuses were examined by the Commission on the Truth for El Salvador and the Ad Hoc Commission. An amnesty law passed by the Legislative Assembly of El Salvador five days after the release of the Truth Commission report prevented judicial prosecution of perpetrators of human rights abuses. The peace accords also required the establishment of the Ad Hoc Commission to evaluate the human rights record of the ESAF officer corps.

In 1993, the last of the 103 officers identified by this commission as responsible for human rights violations were retired, and the U.N. observer mission declared the government in compliance with the Ad Hoc Commission recommendations. Also in 1993, the Government of [El Salvador] and the UN established the Joint Group to investigate whether illegal, armed, politically motivated groups continued to exist after the signing of the peace accords. The group reported its findings in 1994 stating that death squads were no longer active but that violence was still being used to obtain political ends. The group recommended a special National Civilian Police (PNC) unit be created to investigate political and organized crime and that further reforms be made in the judicial system. Not all the group's recommendations were implemented. The peace accords provided for the establishment of a Human Rights Ombudsman's Office (National Counsel for the Defence of Human Rights).

=== 21st century ===
Amnesty International, in a 2008 report that "Widespread human rights violations committed during the internal armed conflict (1980-1992) remained unpunished". They also assert that the government is currently misusing anti-terrorism laws to detain and harass political opponents of the government. In addition, Amnesty International drew attention to several arrests of police officers for unlawful police killings. Other current issues to gain Amnesty International's attention in the past 10 years include missing children, failure of law enforcement to properly investigate and prosecute crimes against women, and rendering organized labor illegal.

==== Salvadoran gang crackdown ====
The state of emergency declared during the 2022 Salvadoran gang crackdown suspended freedom of association and some due process rights; critics said it resulted in arrests unrelated to the gang violence, and silenced government opposition. In 2023, it was reported that many of these prisoners were abused in prison and that many have died.

== Disappearances ==
An estimated 8,000 to 10,000 disappeared during the 12-year civil war. According to the Washington Post, "analysts suspect the gangs and the government hide corpses to keep the homicide rate down". Under the presidency of Bukele thousands have been reported to have disappeared.

== Labor ==
The latter has resulted in union activists being targeted with harassment, violence, and imprisonment. Some, such as Gilberto Soto, the former leader of the International Brotherhood of Teamsters, have been murdered, while others have disappeared. Salvadoran activists working against CAFTA, the abuse of prisoners, the privatization of water, and environmental destruction have all encountered various forms of repression.

Human Rights Watch has released a report on hazardous child labor in the sugarcane industry, claiming,

Businesses purchasing sugar from El Salvador, including The Coca-Cola Company, are using the product of child labor that is both hazardous and widespread. Harvesting cane requires children to use machetes and other sharp knives to cut sugarcane and strip the leaves off the stalks, work they perform for up to nine hours each day in the hot sun. Nearly every child interviewed by Human Rights Watch for its 139-page report said that he or she had suffered machete gashes on the hands or legs while cutting cane.

El Salvador also features prominently in a Human Rights Watch report documenting abuses of women and children working as domestic help, both in terms of being the country of origin of abused workers, and a country where abuse takes place. The December 2014 U.S. Department of Labor's List of Goods Produced by Child Labor or Forced Labor reported four commodities produced exclusively by child labor; namely coffee, fireworks, shellfish and sugarcane.

== Women ==
Abortion in El Salvador is strictly illegal, and the law allows for no exception. In El Salvador, if a woman miscarries, it is frequently assumed she deliberately induced an abortion or could have saved the baby but opted not to. Women who did not know they were pregnant or who could have prevented a miscarriage, face long prison terms.

There has also been progress in the country in regard to women's rights. The 2011 Law for a Life Free of Violence against Women (Ley Especial Integral para una Vida Libre de Violencia para las Mujeres) contains 61 articles that criminalize various forms of violence against women, such as domestic violence, including marital rape, psychological abuse, and economical abuse.

== See also ==
- Corruption in El Salvador
- Crime in El Salvador
- Elections in El Salvador
- Freedom of speech in El Salvador
- Human trafficking in El Salvador
- LGBT rights in El Salvador
