= Reconciliation Monument =

Reconciliation Monument may refer to:

- Reconciliation, a monument by Stephen Broadbent, in Richmond, Virginia, US
- The Chapel of Reconciliation in Berlin, Germany
- The Confederate Memorial in Arlington National Cemetery, Virginia, US
- The Monument to the Reconciliation in San Salvador, El Salvador
- The Peacekeeping Monument in Ottawa, Canada
- The Reconciliation Memorial, a Confederate monument in Kansas, US

== See also ==
- Confederate monuments and memorials, related to the American Civil War
