= Chapultepec Peace Accords =

1992 treaty ending the Salvadoran Civil War

- Type: Peace treaty
- Context: Salvadoran Civil War
- Signed: January 16, 1992
- Location: Chapultepec Castle, Mexico
- Effective: February 1, 1992
- Parties: (El Salvador) Salvadoran government Farabundo Martí National Liberation Front
- Language: Spanish

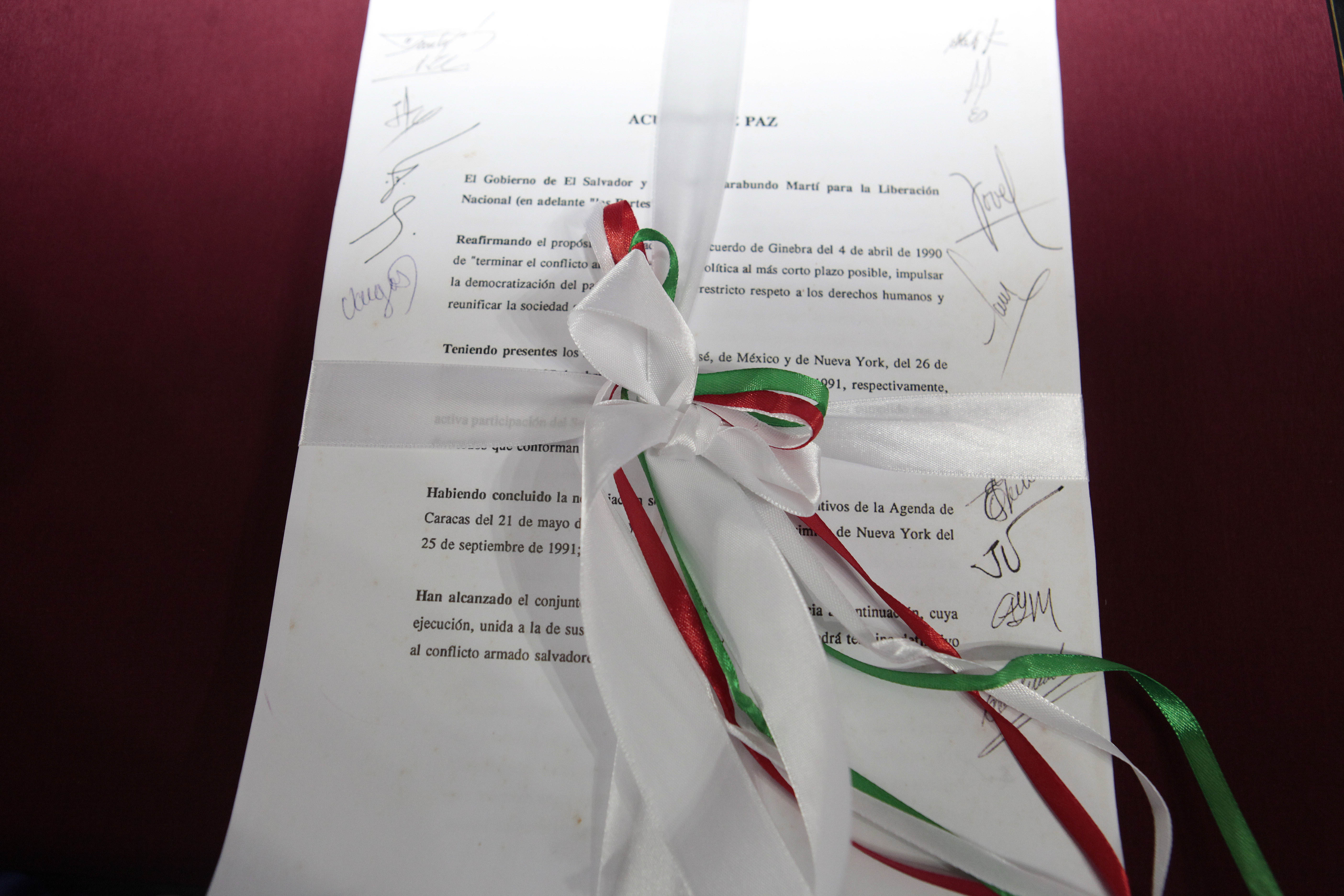
The Chapultepec Peace Accords. For Maurice Lemoine, French intellectual “at the negotiating table, puts an end to a sixty-year-old military hegemony and will allow a deep reform of the State based on a series of unprecedented measures: respect for universal suffrage; reform of the judiciary; constitutional reform; separation of Defense and Public Security, downsizing of the army, creation of a national civilian police

The Chapultepec Peace Accords were a set of peace agreements signed on January 16, 1992, the day in which the Salvadoran Civil War ended. The treaty established peace between the Salvadoran government and the Farabundo Martí National Liberation Front (FMLN). It was signed in Chapultepec Castle, Mexico.

The treaty was negotiated by representatives of the Salvadoran government, the rebel movement FMLN, and political parties, with observers from the Roman Catholic Church and United Nations. The peace talks were mediated by Álvaro de Soto, the special representative of the UN Secretary-General.

The final agreement was divided into 9 chapters that covered 5 fundamental areas:

- Modification of the Armed Forces and demobilization of all armed FMLN units;
- Replacement of the National Guard with the National Civil Police;
- Modifications to the judicial system and the defense of human rights;
- Modification to the electoral system;
- The adoption of measures affecting the economic and social fields.

Compliance with the agreements took place under the supervision of a special mission of the United Nations, which gave a settlement after 3 years of management. On December 31, 1991, the government and the FMLN initialed a preliminary peace agreement under the auspices of UN Secretary-General Javier Pérez de Cuéllar. The final agreement was signed in Mexico City on January 16, 1992, at Chapultepec Castle.

A nine-month ceasefire took effect on February 1, 1992, and it was never broken.

== Civil War ==
The Salvadoran Civil War began on October 15, 1979, with the 1979 Salvadoran coup d'état which overthrew President Carlos Humberto Romero. The coup had covert support from the United States, who wished to prevent Romero's government from falling to left-wing militant groups in the country, the same fate as did the regime of Anastasio Somoza Debayle in Nicaragua.

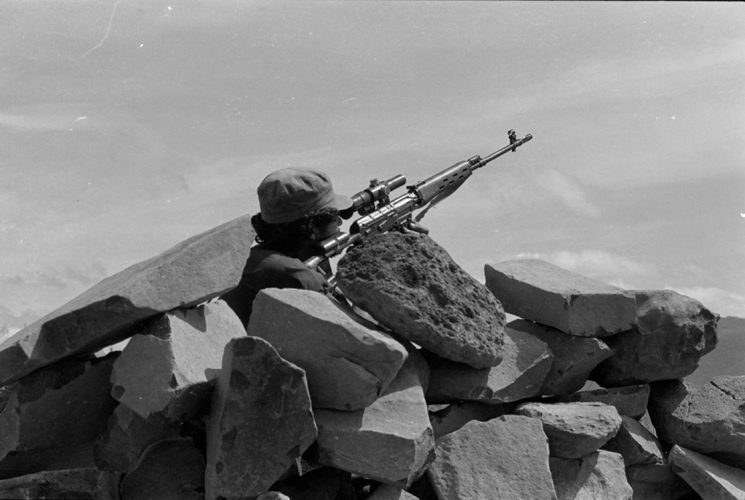
An ERP combatant in Perquín in 1990.

The coup of 1979 allowed for the rise of militant left-wing groups in the country. The five largest groups, Farabundo Martí People's Forces of Liberation (FPL), Communist Party of El Salvador (PCES), National Resistance (RN), People's Revolutionary Army (ERP), and the Revolutionary Party of the Central American Workers – El Salvador (PRTC) joined forces on October 10, 1980, nearly one year after the coup, to form the Farabundo Martí National Liberation Front (FMLN), the most prominent opposition force to the Salvadoran government throughout the Salvadoran Civil War. The group was named after Farabundo Martí, the leader of the Communist Party during an uprising in 1932 which resulted in the massacre of 10,000 to 40,000 peasants under the rule of Maximiliano Hernández Martínez.

The resulting civil war killed anywhere from 70,000 to 80,000 people and lasted twelve years from 1979 to 1992. After 10 years of war, more than one million people had been displaced out of a population of 5,389,000. 40% of the homes of newly displaced people were completely destroyed and another 25% were in need of major repairs. Death squad activities further escalated in 1990, despite a U.N. Agreement on Human Rights signed July 26 by the Cristiani government and the FMLN.

== Previous peace process ==
The Peace Accords were the result of a long negotiation process between the Government and the FMLN that had begun in the mid-1980s. The first meetings took place in Chalatenango on October 15, 1984, exactly 5 years after the start of the civil war. Further negotiations occurred in La Libertad on November 30, 1984. A third round of negotiations occurred in San Miguel on September 19, 1986. The last negotiations occurred in San Salvador on October 4, 1987, between President José Napoleón Duarte and government officials with delegates of the FMLN's leadership. Despite the attempts to establish peace and end the war, none of them succeeded and the war dragged on.

=== Chalatenango ===
On October 16, 1984, the first round of negotiations occurred in La Palma, Chalatenango. The meeting resulted in the "La Palma Joint Communiqué." The Government delegation was made up of the President, José Napoleón Duarte, while the guerrilla delegation was headed by Dr. Guillermo Ungo, a former member of the Revolutionary Government Junta, with Monsignor Arturo Rivera y Damas, Archbishop of San Salvador, acting as a mediator. The statement was brief and vague; without firm agreements and with the sole achievement of constituting a political rapprochement.

=== La Libertad ===
On November 30, 1984, the second round of negotiations occurred in Ayagualo, La Libertad. The negotiations were headed by government representative Abraham Rodríguez with Rubén Zamora representing the guerrillas. Rivera y Damas, Giacomo Otonello, and Gregorio Rosa Chávez acted as mediators. At the meeting, the "Ayagualo Joint Communiqué" was drafted.

=== San Miguel ===
On September 19, 1986, the third round of negotiations took place in Sesori, San Miguel. Rodolfo Antonio Castillo Claramount represented the government and Jorge Villacorta represented the guerillas with Monsignor Rivera y Damas acting as mediator. The terms of the negotiations were not carried out however due to a breakdown in the negotiations. It was not until several months later that the process was resumed in a private meeting in Panama.

=== San Salvador ===
From October 4 to 5, 1987, the final round of negotiations occurred in San Salvador. Fidel Chávez Mena represented the government with Salvador Samayoa representing the guerillas and Monsignor Rivera y Damas as mediator. At that meeting, the "Joint Communiqué of the Third Dialogue Meeting" was issued which stated the government and guerrillas will to seek a ceasefire and to support the decisions made by the Contadora Group which was seeking peace in Central America.

== International intervention ==
In 1989, the government of President Alfredo Cristiani called for a dialogue meeting which was held on September 15 of that year in Mexico City. There, a joint request for mediation was addressed to the Secretary General of the United Nations, Javier Pérez de Cuéllar. It was agreed to and Álvaro de Soto was appointed as special representative. On November 11, 1989, the FMLN launched a general offensive to demonstrate its military strength. The offensive was contained by the Armed Forces. After the offensive concluded in a stalemate with 2,500 dead, many analysts considered the impossibility of military victory for either side in the conflict.

On April 4, 1990, a dialogue meeting was held in Geneva, Switzerland, where an agreement was signed that established the set of rules to be followed in the negotiation process and established the will of both parties to reach a negotiated and political solution to end the war. The objectives of the negotiation were set:

- End the armed conflict through political means;
- Promote the democratization of the country;
- Guarantee the unrestricted respect for human rights;
- Reunify Salvadoran society

On May 21, 1990, at a new meeting in Caracas, Venezuela, the general agenda for negotiations was established and the issues that would be submitted for discussion. Two negotiating delegations were created: the government under David Escobar Galindo, Abelardo Rodríguez, Oscar Santamaría, and Mauricio Ernesto Vargas, and the FMLN under Schafik Hándal, Joaquín Villalobos, Salvador Sánchez Cerén, José Eduardo Sancho Castañeda, Francisco Jovel, Salvador Samayoa, Nidia Díaz, Juan Ramón Medrano, Ana Guadalupe Martínez, and Roberto Reeds.

== Accords ==
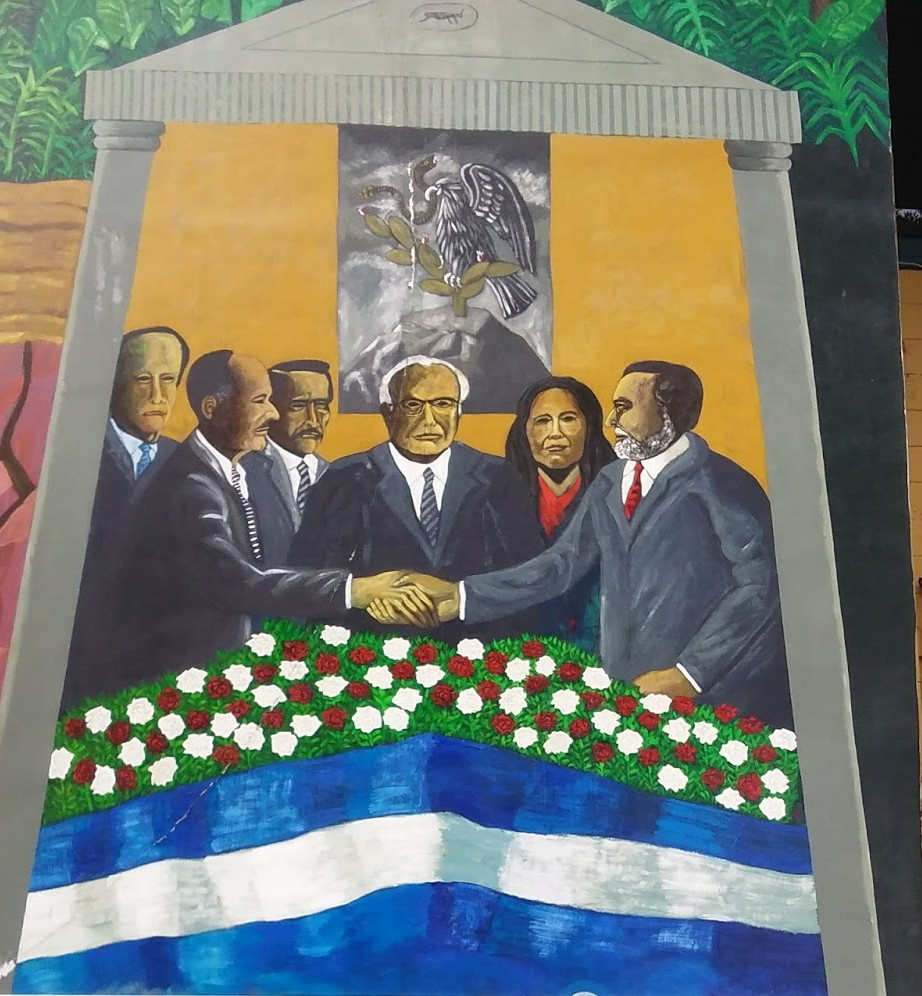
Mural of the peace agreement located on the national museum in San Salvador; in the image the guerilla leader Schafik Handal leader of the FMLN and the president of El Salvador Alfredo Cristiani shaking hands.

On January 16, 1992, the full text of the agreements was signed in the Castle of Chapultepec in a solemn act, with the assistance of Heads of State from friendly countries, as well as official negotiating delegations.

=== Chapter I ===
Chapter I handled with the Armed Forces of El Salvador which accepted the following terms:

- Modify the doctrinal principles of the Armed Forces so that it could comply with the agreements made, establishing that the sole objective of the institution is "the defense of the sovereignty of the State and the integrity of the territory, it is a permanent institution at the service of the nation" and clarifying that the institution "is obedient, professional, apolitical and non-deliberative."
- Reform the educational system of the Armed Forces.
- Create the Ad Hoc Commission to purge officers implicated in Human Rights violations.
- Reduce the number of troops of the Armed Forces. (Note: A total of 21,000 soldiers were discharged from the Armed Forces and they were paid their respective compensation, ending the process a year earlier than expected, on February 28, 1993.)
- Overcome impunity with the creation of the Truth Commission that would investigate the most serious acts of violence in the civil war. (Note: The dismissal of officers began on December 31, 1992.)
- Dissolve the 3 public security bodies that depended on the Armed Forces: the National Guard, National Police, and Treasury Police.
- Dissolve the military intelligence services (National Security Agency of El Salvador, ANSESAL) and create a civil intelligence service: the State Intelligence Agency (AEI). (Note: The old intelligence bodies were suppressed in their entirety on June 9, 1992, giving way to the new ones that had already been operating since April 28 of the same year.)
- Dissolve the Immediate Reaction Infantry Battalions (BIRI). (Note: The General Eusebio Bracamonte Battalion was dissolved on August 16, 1992, the Atlácatl Battalion on December 8, 1992, and the General Manuel José Arce Battalion on February 6, 1993; contributing a total of demobilizations that reached 10,000 troops.)
- Reform the Constitution to clearly define the subordination of the Armed Forces to the civil authority.
- Suppress paramilitary entities (Civil Defense Patrols). (Note: Of all the paramilitaries that operated during the civil war, only Sombra Negra remains active.)
- Suspend forced recruitment activities.

=== Chapter II ===
Chapter II handled with the police force of the nation to which the government complied with the following terms:

- Create the National Civil Police as a new police force that will replace the old security forces with a civil and democratic doctrine.
- Establish quotas for the personnel of the new police force, in which demobilized elements of the FMLN, former agents of the National Police, and people without militancy on both sides would participate. It was agreed that it should be 20% for each side and 60% for neutral participants.
- Create the National Academy of Public Security to train the agents of the National Civil Police, emphasizing training to respect Human Rights.

=== Chapter III ===
Chapter III handled with human rights and the judiciary to which the government complied with the following terms:

- Create the Judicial Training School to train judges and magistrates adjusted to the new reality of the country.
- Reform the structure of the National Council of the Judiciary (the body that appoints and evaluates judges) to give it greater independence.
- Reform the election process and terms of the magistrates of the Supreme Court of Justice.
- Create the Procurator for the Defense of Human Rights (PDDH), an autonomous institution, which must supervise respect for human rights by the other state institutions.

=== Chapter IV ===
Chapter IV handled the civil and political rights of citizens which both sides agreed to:

- Create institutional reforms.
- Create the Supreme Electoral Tribunal, the highest administrative and jurisdictional authority on the matter of elections.
- The right of political parties to monitor the preparation, organization, publication, and updating of the electoral register.
- At the political level, the measures adopted sought to guarantee the FMLN leaders and their members the full exercise of their civil and political rights within a framework of absolute legality, through their incorporation into the civil, political and institutional life of the country. The FMLN pledged to demobilize its guerrilla forces, under the supervision of ONUSAL. The government promised to pass the legislation necessary for the FMLN to become a legal political party and to participate in the general elections of 1994.

=== Chapter V ===
Chapter V handled economic and social fields to which the government agreed to:

- Create the Economic and Social Agreement Forum, a body where trade unions, business associations, and the State would have representation to discuss the country's economic policy.
- Distribute land in conflict zones among demobilized ex-combatants.
- The lands that exceeded 245 hectares, as well as those properties of the State that were not a natural reserve, had to be distributed among peasants and small farmers who lacked arable land.

== Compliance ==
The definitive cessation of the fighting occurred on February 1, 1992, under the supervision of COPAZ and the notable presence of former FMLN commanders and their former enemies. In order for such a meeting to take place, the Legislative Assembly approved a National Reconciliation Law on January 23, by means of which El Salvador refused to open legal cases against the war fighters, opening a national amnesty. The Massive and gradual loss of troops from the Armed Forces took place while ex-guerrilla combatants were deployed from the occupied zones to fifteen areas that had previously been established for that purpose. Guerrilla weapons were deposited in containers controlled by ONUSAL, except those small arms intended for personal defense.

Police agents from various countries accompanied the National Police on patrol tasks, which had ceased to depend on the Ministry of National Defense; said support was given until the creation of the National Civil Police.

The distribution of land to ex-combatants took longer than expected, as did the establishment of the National Academy of Public Security and the legalization of the FMLN as a political party. The delays began to create tension among the political forces which led COPAZ to call for a rescheduling which was carried out on June 12, 1992. Said schedule was repeatedly modified to adjust to the actual deadlines that set the pace of progress in the process. Several months later than planned, on December 15, 1992, the definitive end of the armed conflict was officially celebrated.

== Conclusion of accords ==
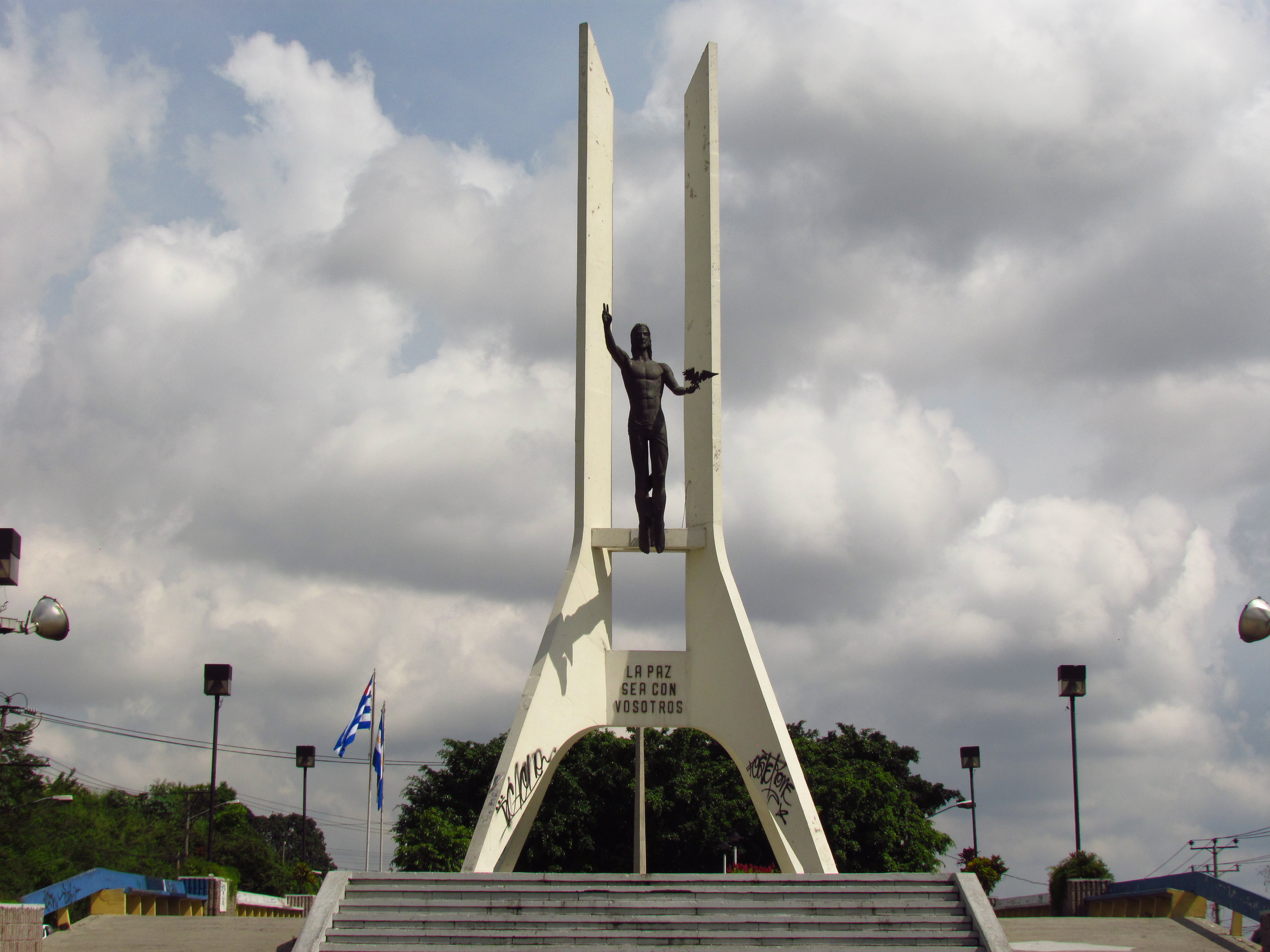
The Monument to Peace, built in 1994, to commemorate the Chapultepec Peace Accords.

In 1997, Boutros Boutros-Ghali, Secretary General of the United Nations, ended the peace process in El Salvador, noting that although it was true that not all the agreements had been fully complied with, the degree of compliance was acceptable.

== Monuments ==
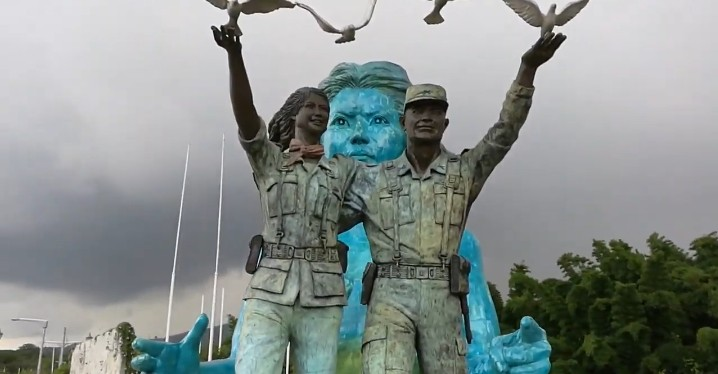
The Monument to the Reconciliation

The Monument to Peace is a sculpture designed by the sculptor Rubén Martínez that was unveiled in the municipality of San Marcos, El Salvador.

The figure of the "Christ of Peace", which was made with bullet casings, brass and cast bronze, and stands with outstretched arms as a symbol of reconciliation between the political ideologies of the right and the left. The figure of a dove in his left hand in flight position.

In 2017, on the 25th anniversary of the signing of the peace accords in the, President Salvador Sánchez Cerén, an ex-FMLN commander, celebrated with the inauguration of the Monument to the Reconciliation. In January 2024, the monument was demolished to make way for a new peace walk.

== See also ==
- Salvadoran Civil War
- Truth Commission for El Salvador
