= Gender inequality in El Salvador =

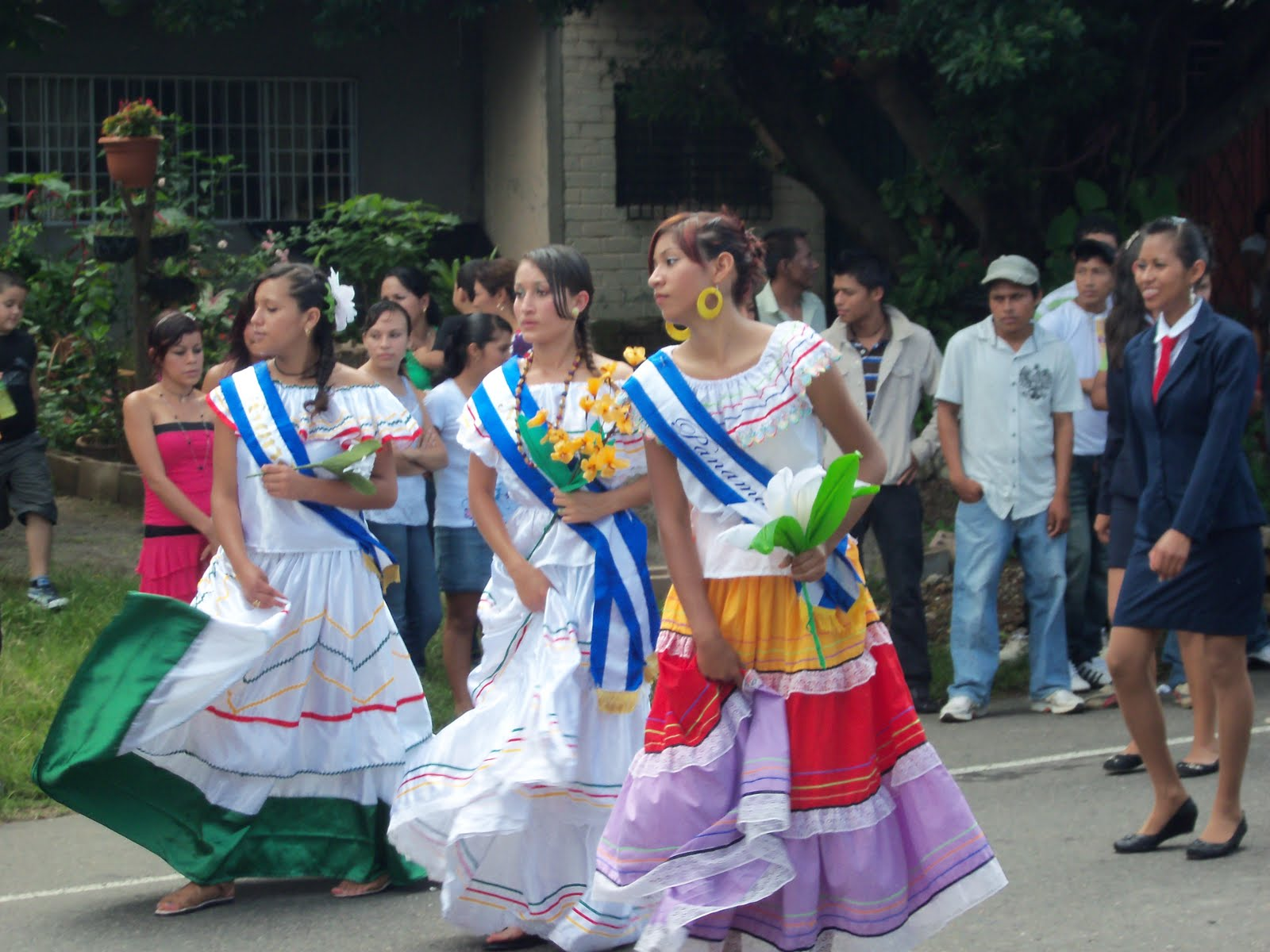
Women celebrating La Fiestas Patrias in Las Chinamas

Gender inequality can be found in various areas of Salvadoran life such as employment, health, education, political participation, and family life. Although women in El Salvador enjoy equal protection under the law, they are often at a disadvantage relative to their male counterparts. In the area of politics, women have the same rights as men, but the percentage of women in office compared to men is low. Though much progress has been made since the Salvadoran Civil War ended in 1992, women in El Salvador still face gender inequality.

== Background ==
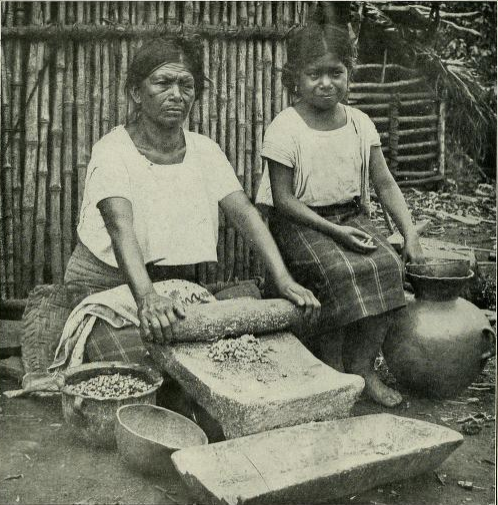
A woman and a girl in El Salvador making bread, 1910s.

El Salvador is a country in Central America. Most of its population is Mestizo, but there are also white and indigenous (Amerindian) Salvadorans. The country was the scene of a brutal civil war, the Salvadoran Civil War, between 1979 – 1992, which subjected women to extreme violence. More than half of Salvadorans are Roman Catholic, with the next group being that of Protestants (see Religion in El Salvador).

== Ratification of CEDAW ==
On August 19, 1981, El Salvador ratified the convention on the Elimination of all Forms of Discrimination Against Women (CEDAW), which defines discrimination and establishes an agenda for national action to end such discrimination. Upon signing, El Salvador made one reservation to article 29 paragraph 1. The paragraph states that any dispute between states that is not resolved through negotiation shall go to arbitration. If the dispute is not resolved through arbitration within 6 months, the case shall then go to the International Court of Justice.

In reviewing the combined third and fourth, and fifth and sixth periodic reports submitted by El Salvador in 2003, the CEDAW committee expressed concern that the laws and policies against inequality had not been effectively implemented; the Salvadoran Constitution did not specifically prohibit gender discrimination and did not include the definition of discrimination included in the convention; and the Penal Code only sanctioned "serious" discrimination. In the seventh periodic report in 2007, the government of El Salvador responded to the Committee that the Salvadoran Constitution does address the issues of concern, citing articles 32, 37, 53, 65, 71, 72, and 101 of the country's constitution. Although CEDAW may be correct in referring to El Salvador's lack of implementation, the Salvadoran Constitution does address the issue of discrimination.

In 1996, prior to the committee's review of El Salvador's compliance with CEDAW, the government of El Salvador established the Institute for Development of Women. The Institute seeks to ensure that action plans created by the government to protect women are implemented effectively.

On March 17, 2011, the General Assembly passed the Law of Equality, Fairness, and the Elimination of Discrimination Against Women, which improves the judicial framework for protecting women's rights by implementing a set of regulations. The law mandates equality in pay between men and women and recognizes the value of domestic labor. In addition, it helps protect the rights of rural women.

== Reproductive health and rights ==
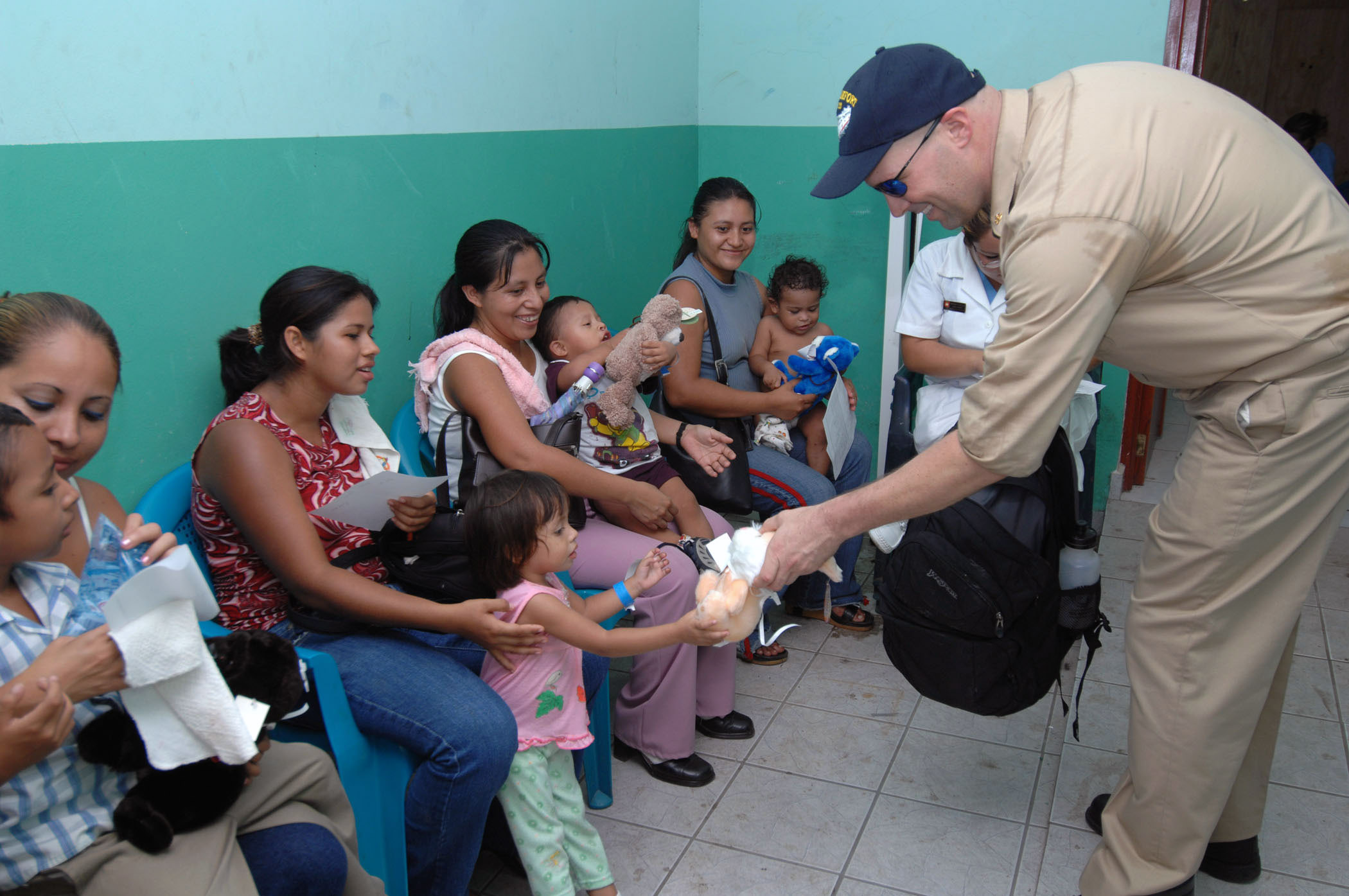
Mothers with children

In 2015, the maternal mortality ratio in El Salvador was 54 deaths/100,000 live births and the total fertility rate was 1.91 children born/woman.

During the 2005–2009 period, 94 percent of Salvadoran pregnant women received at least one antenatal visit, which is above the 84.1 percent average for their Human Development group. In addition, 96 percent of all births were attended by skilled health personnel, compared to the 78.1 percent average for their respective group, signifying stronger reproductive health status among women.

Reproductive rights of women in El Salvador are highly restricted. The abortion policy in El Salvador is one of the most restrictive in the world. Abortion is illegal in all cases, even when the mother's life is endangered. Currently both major political parties, ARENA on the right and FMLN on the left, have anti-abortion platforms. Prior to 1999, the FMLN had a moderate stance on abortion. They were against it except when the health of the mother is in danger, but after strong opposition and not winning an election since its founding, the FMLN switched its stance and allowed their representatives to "vote their conscience". In 1999, a constitutional amendment was passed, putting in place the current policy, with 72 favorable votes in a legislative assembly of 84 members. There were 12 abstentions, and no negative votes.

The penalty for getting an abortion can range from two to eight years if convicted and abortion practitioners can receive prison terms of six to 12 years. If a judge rules that the fetus is viable, then the ruling can be switched to aggravated homicide, which can result in the woman receiving 30–50 years of prison. During the abortion debate, dialogue between opposing sides brought to light the state of gender inequality in the country. Some politicians and activists suggested that women should not sleep with men if they did not want to become pregnant. In "The Left and Life in El Salvador," Jocelyn Viterna points out that such views powerfully ignore the reality for many Salvadoran women, given that many of them have little control over their own sexual encounters. In 2017 Maria Teresa Rivera became the first woman in the world granted asylum because of being wrongly jailed for disregarding a ban on abortion; she disregarded the ban in El Salvador and was given asylum in Sweden.

As in other Latin American countries, cohabitation is very common, with formal marriage being practised by the upper classes. In the 1990s, 73% of births were to unmarried women. As in other countries of the region, formal marriage is a marker of status and education.

== Education ==
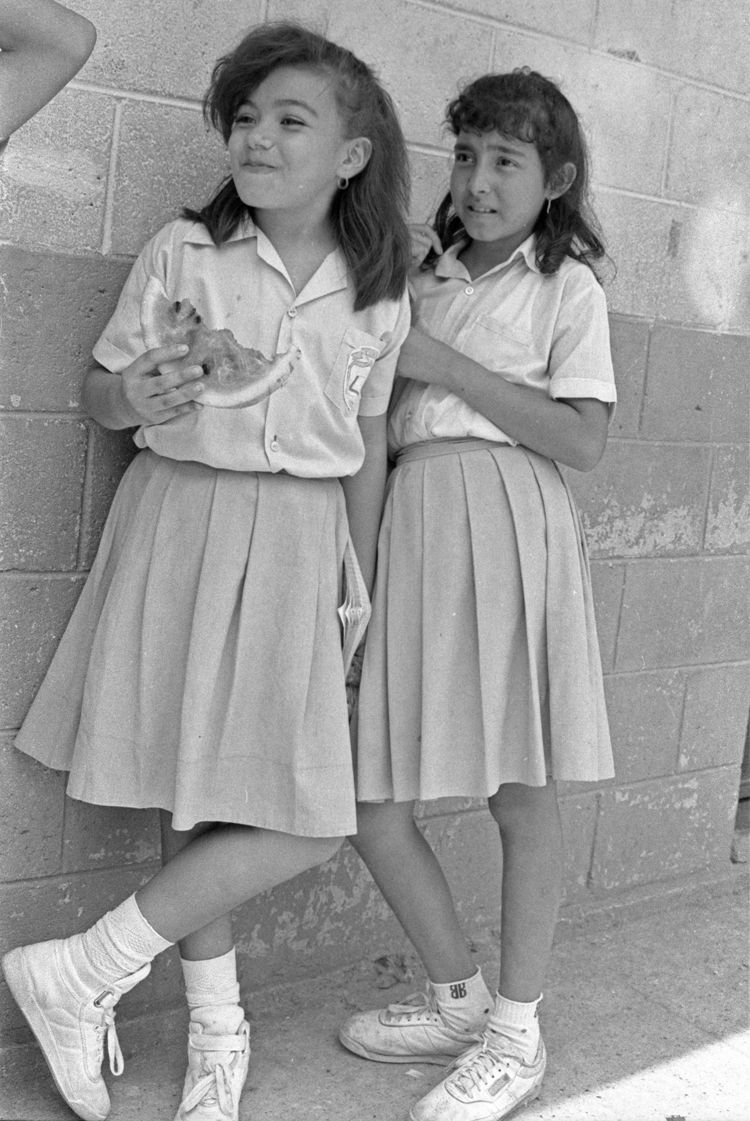
Salvadoran school girls in 1990.

Although primary school participation rates are similar for both men and women, secondary education rates differ significantly. In 2011, 47.5 percent of men 25 and older had a secondary education and only 40.5 percent of women 25 and older obtained the same level. Both of these are below the average for El Salvador's Human Development group, which reports 57.7 percent for men and 41.2 percent for women.

The low percentage of the population with a secondary education reflect a history of limited educational resources, especially in rural areas, where 70% of schools only offered schooling until grade 5 in the 1970s. In those that did offer secondary education, there was a high rate of attrition among women, who left school to help with domestic work, including caring for younger siblings, working in the fields, or tending animals.

In 1976, about 5 percent of rural school-aged children reached grade 9. As of 2015, literacy rates are still higher for men than women: 90.4% for males and 86% for females (aged 15 and over).

== Employment ==
Women in El Salvador are employed at lower rates than men, and on average make less in wages compared to their male counterparts. Nevertheless, as of 2014, women made 42.2% of the labor force. When employed, women on average make 11.5 percent less than employed men. This disparity only increases as years of schooling increases. According to the USAID, "In 2006, women with 10–12 years of education earned 15 percent less than men with the same level of education; women with 13 years or more of education earned 24 percent less than men with similar education levels; and women with 1–3 years of education earned 6 percent less than men with 1–3 years of education." USAID attributes these differences to gender discrimination in both occupation and wages.

Maquiladora employment is one area of debate among scholars of women's export sector employment. Maquiladoras are foreign-owned factories that employ mostly women in the production of textiles for export. In 2008, women maquila workers made up 80 percent of total employed women in the country, and about 50 percent of them were single mothers. In a 2007 report, the CEDAW Committee reported that the maquiladora industry was responsible for a widespread denial of women's labor rights. The report cites some of the violations as lack of access to social security and maternity benefits, poor working conditions, and exposure to violence and sexual harassment.

The overall effect of these factories on gender inequality is contested. Scholars such as Linda Lim and Naila Kabeer argue that the maquila sector has not had a negative effect on women. In 1990, Lim argued that maquiladoras offer women a good alternative and an opportunity to work in the formal sector. In 2004, Kabeer argued that the factory work can build women's self-esteem and independence. In 2010, however, Edme Dominguez et al. argued against the positive portrayal made by Lim and Kabeer. They make the point that gender relations have changed very little since the proliferation of maquiladoras. They say that the low levels of income earned by female workers acts as only a means of survival and does not allow them to "question the patriarchal gender order".

== Conditional cash transfers ==
Conditional cash transfer programs (CCTs) are government-led initiatives that seek to reduce poverty by making welfare programs conditional upon certain criteria. The recipient of government aid must meet the specified criteria in order for the aid to be disbursed. In El Salvador, conditional cash transfers are one component of Red Solidaria, the main welfare program aimed at helping the country's poorest population. Upon its enactment in 2005, Red Solidaria brought into effect conditional cash transfers targeted to families with pregnant women and children under 15 years old who had not received education beyond the 6th grade. The aid was conditional on basic health activities and school attendance. It also included lifelong learning sessions for beneficiary families. The use of the cash transfers was stipulated for food consumption. The program positively affected poverty reduction and reduced income inequality, as well as outcomes at time of birth, such as skilled attendance of health professionals and live births in a hospital.

While Juliana Franzoni and Koen Voorend acknowledge the positive effects that CCTs had on poverty reduction and enhanced income inequality, they argue that the transfers did little to impact unequal gender relations. While the CCTs helped women in some positive ways, Franzoni and Voorend argue that the CCTs did little to change the "patriarchal maternalism", or the viewing of women primarily as mothers instead of workers or citizens, which shapes Latin American social policy.

== Political involvement ==
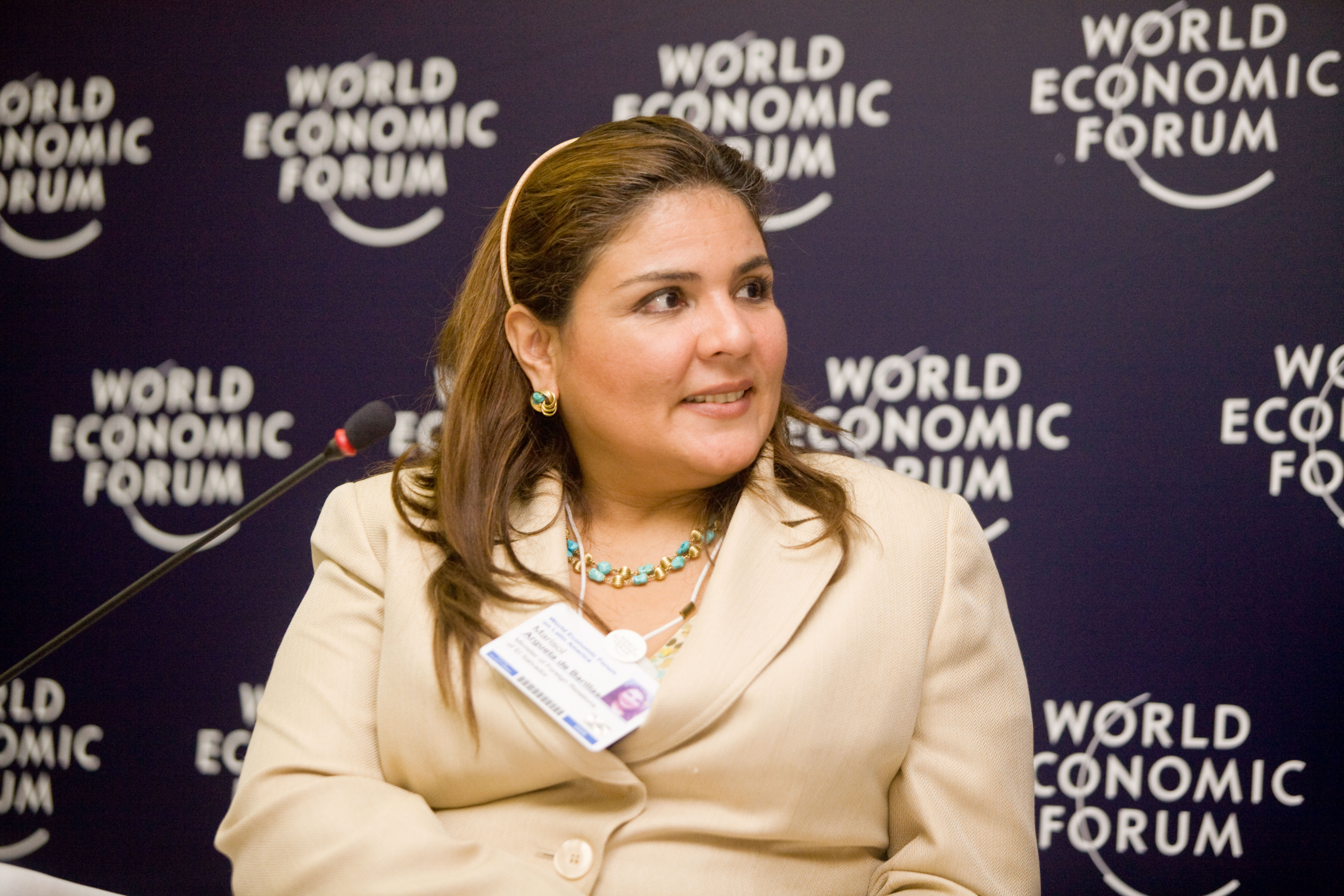
Marisol Argueta de Barillas, Foreign Minister of El Salvador 2008–2009.

Men and women in El Salvador have the same rights to vote, run for office, organize, etc., but actual participation among women is considerably lower than men. Although the involvement of women in politics has traditionally been low, it has increased in recent years: according to a 2007 CEDAW report, the Government of El Salvador had pushed for increased involvement in municipalities, resulting in increased participation at this level. As of 2015, women made 32.10% of the Parliament.

In order to improve overall participation among women, the Association of Salvadoran Women Parliamentarians and ex-Parliamentarians (ASPARLEXSAL) was formed in 2003. With support from the United Nations Democracy Fund, the Association offers training and resources to women looking to get involved in politics.

== Crimes against women ==
Crimes against women in El Salvador are prevalent even though violence and discrimination are illegal in the country. The US State Department addressed the issue of sexual harassment in its 2010 Human Rights Report. The law defines sexual harassment as any unwanted physical contact; it does not address non-physical contact such as verbal harassment. The report says that estimation of the exact prevalence of the problem is difficult because of how much it is underreported, but there were 367 complaints of sexual harassment through July 2010, which resulted in 138 trials, and only 11 convictions.

The penal code prohibits sex trafficking in El Salvador, as well as all forms of human trafficking, with conviction resulting in four to eight years of prison. Compared to other offenses, the punishment for trafficking is not commensurate. Rape for example, carries a punishment of six to 20 years imprisonment for those convicted. In 2011, Salvadoran officials reported investigating 76 potential cases of human trafficking, with 15 traffickers being convicted. The prison sentence for those convicted ranged from four to nine years imprisonment. Fifteen convictions was five times that of the previous year, which had only three convictions. The U.S. State Department identified corruption as one main obstacle to conviction of sex traffickers, citing a 2011 case where the charges of nine suspected traffickers were dismissed because the judge said that the underage victims should have been prosecuted for having false identity documents.

Femicides, or the killing of women because they are women, have become more frequent in recent years, with 2011 having the highest number to date – 628. While the number decreased to 320 in 2012, it is of particular interest when looking at gender inequality as it is the most serious form of gender discrimination. In "No More Killings! Women Respond to Femicides in Central America," Marina Prieto Carron et al., argue that femicide is one manifestation of deeply entrenched gender inequality, discrimination, economic disempowerment, and machismo that exists in Latin America. They argue that femicide represents a backlash against women who are empowered and have moved away from traditional female roles.

Victims of sexual crimes in El Salvador are disproportionately women. Of the total 3,436 sexual abuse convictions in 2011, 88% of the victims were female. In 2011, there were 224 rape convictions, though many incidents are not reported due to social and cultural factors.

In 2016, El Salvador reported 524 femicides cases (one every 18 hours). While in 2017 and 2018, the country experienced a decrease in the number of these, there were still 851 women that died for being female during this period. Furthermore, according to a national survey in 2017, 67% of Salvadorian women have suffered some form of violence, sexual assault or abuse in their lifetime by their intimate partners or family members. Nevertheless, only 6% of these victims reported to the authorities, while the rest do not do it due to fear, shame, or because they thought they would not believe them. Also, according to the UN, three-quarters of femicides in El Salvador never get taken to court, and only 7% of those cases result in a conviction.

In 2026 El Salvador's court has issued for the first time in the country's history a life sentence for femicide. This sentence came following several reforms promoted by the government led by Nayib Bukele.

=== Domestic abuse ===
Under national law, women have the same rights as men do in a marriage relationship. The minimum age for marriage is 18, but marriage can be legally entered into at the age of 14 if the couple has reached puberty, if the woman is pregnant, or if they have had a child together. The Constitution speaks out against inequality in marriage. Under Article 36 of the Constitution, "Spouses have equal rights and duties, and since they have decided to share their lives, they must live together, be faithful to one another and assist each other in all circumstances and situations." It also makes clear that, "Housework and child care shall be the responsibility of both spouses." However, these principles do not always hold true in practice.

Domestic abuse in El Salvador is prohibited under the law and sentencing can result in one to three years in prison, but the law is not always well enforced. In 2010, the Salvadoran Institute for the Development of Women reported that they had received 4,732 reports of domestic violence. The Office of the Attorney General investigated only 661 cases of domestic violence during the same year. The investigations led to only 3 convictions, with 71 cases resolved through mediation.

Even though the number of official reports appears high, in reality cases are underreported to government entities. In a study done by the Pan-American Health Organization and the Centers for Disease Control and Prevention in 2012, 26.3% of women in El Salvador reported that they had experienced some sort of physical or sexual violence from their partners. The underreporting of incidents may be due to the fact that in 2010 domestic violence was considered socially acceptable by a large portion of the population. One cultural challenge that El Salvador faces in moving towards gender equality in the home is that of machismo, which is strong, or aggressive masculine pride. The practice can take the form of husbands being overbearing or controlling and even extend to physical or verbal abuse.

The 2011 Law for a Life Free of Violence against Women (Ley Especial Integral para una Vida Libre de Violencia para las Mujeres) contains 61 articles that criminalize various forms of violence against women, such as domestic violence, including marital rape, psychological abuse, and economical abuse.
