= Human trafficking in El Salvador =

In 2009 El Salvador was a source, transit, and destination country for women and children who were subjected to trafficking in persons, specifically forced prostitution and forced labor. Most victims were Salvadoran women and girls from rural areas who were forced into commercial sexual exploitation in urban areas, though some adults and children were subjected to forced labor as agricultural workers and domestic workers. The majority of foreign victims were women and children from neighboring countries, such as Honduras, Nicaragua, and the Dominican Republic, who migrated to El Salvador in response to job offers, but were subsequently forced into prostitution or domestic servitude. Trafficking offenders used fraudulent documentation to facilitate the movement of foreign victims. Salvadorans have been subjected to forced prostitution in Guatemala, Mexico, Belize, the United States, Spain, and Italy.

In 2009 the Government of El Salvador did not fully comply with the minimum standards for the elimination of trafficking, however, it made significant efforts to do so. During 2009, the government sustained anti-trafficking law enforcement efforts and continued to provide services to children who were trafficked for sexual exploitation. It did not vigorously investigate or prosecute incidents of forced labor, and it did not take adequate measures to ensure that adult trafficking victims received access to necessary services.

The U.S. State Department's Office to Monitor and Combat Trafficking in Persons placed the country in "Tier 2" in 2017. The country was on the Tier 2 watch list in 2023.

El Salvador ratified the 2000 UN TIP Protocol in March 2004.

In 2017, authorities investigated 73 sex trafficking cases, two forced labor cases, and one domestic servitude case, in comparison to 55 sex trafficking cases in 2016. Offenders convicted in 2017 received sentences ranging from 10 to 14 years imprisonment.

== Sex trafficking ==
Citizen and foreign women and girls have been victims of sex trafficking in El Salvador. They have been raped and physically and psychologically harmed in locations throughout the country.

== Prosecution (2009) ==
Article 367B of the Salvadoran Penal Code prohibits all forms of human trafficking, and prescribes penalties of four to eight years’ imprisonment. Sentences may be increased by one-third when the offense is accompanied by aggravated circumstances, such as when the offense is committed against a child or the defendant is a public official. Such penalties are sufficiently stringent, but are not commensurate with penalties prescribed for serious offenses such as rape, which carries a punishment of six to 20 years’ imprisonment. Since passage of El Salvador's anti-trafficking statute in 2004, some prosecutors prefer to charge trafficking-related crimes under the country's rape statute to secure heavier mandatory sentences against offenders. In 2009, the government's dedicated anti-trafficking police and prosecutor units investigated 70 cases of human trafficking, prosecuted seven cases, and obtained seven convictions with imposed sentences ranging from 4 to 10 years’ imprisonment. While the government secured a number of convictions equal to the previous year, they prosecuted fewer cases than in 2008, when prosecutors brought charges in 15 cases of human trafficking. The majority of law enforcement efforts focused on sex trafficking. The government sustained partnerships with neighbouring foreign governments in pursuing joint anti-trafficking investigations. During the reporting period, the government investigated three public officials for trafficking-related offences, including the former anti-trafficking coordinator in the Attorney General's Office; charges have not yet been filed. In conjunction with an NGO, government officials drafted and distributed guidelines for criminal judges and prosecutors on procedures for human trafficking cases.

== Protection (2009) ==
The Salvadoran government sustained modest victim assistance last year. Immigration officials screened for possible trafficking victims in border regions, notifying the police and referring victims to care facilities; in general, however, the Salvadoran government did not proactively identify trafficking victims among other vulnerable populations, such as women in prostitution or child laborers. The government maintained a shelter dedicated to underage girls who had been victims of sex trafficking; this shelter offered victims psychological and medical care. Most government assistance and services were directed at child trafficking victims, and were not readily accessible to adult or male trafficking victims. However, the government operated a women's shelter serving at least one victim of human trafficking and provided some adult victims with legal and medical services. Adult trafficking victims were also referred to a government-run shelter for undocumented aliens. Further services were provided by NGOs and international organizations. Authorities identified 51 victims of human trafficking in 2009; all but three of these victims were girls, and all but one victim was subjected to forced prostitution. The government trained personnel, including consular officers, in identifying Salvadoran trafficking victims abroad; consular officials identified 21 such trafficking victims during the reporting period. Domestically, Salvadoran authorities encouraged identified victims to assist with law enforcement efforts; 55 victims participated in investigations or prosecutions of their traffickers during the reporting period, though others chose not to assist law enforcement efforts due to social stigma or fear of reprisals from their traffickers. Victims generally were not charged, jailed, or penalized for unlawful acts committed as a direct result of being trafficked; however, not all government officials recognized cases of forced labor or forced prostitution as human trafficking. Law enforcement and social service officials may request residency status for a victim on a case-by-case basis, though they reported no trafficking victims requested this status over the last year.

== Prevention (2009) ==
The Salvadoran government sustained anti-trafficking prevention efforts during the reporting period. The government forged or continued partnerships with NGOs, international organizations, and foreign governments on anti-trafficking initiatives. In May 2009, the government collaborated with an NGO to launch a campaign aimed specifically at increasing awareness of the commercial sexual exploitation of children; the campaign reached approximately 4,500 children and adults. The government included anti-trafficking information in the training it gives to military forces prior to their deployment for international peacekeeping missions. No specific government efforts to reduce demand for commercial sex acts or forced labor were reported over the last year.

== See also ==
- Human rights in El Salvador
