= Monument to the Reconciliation =

Former monument in El Salvador

- Monumento a la Reconciliación
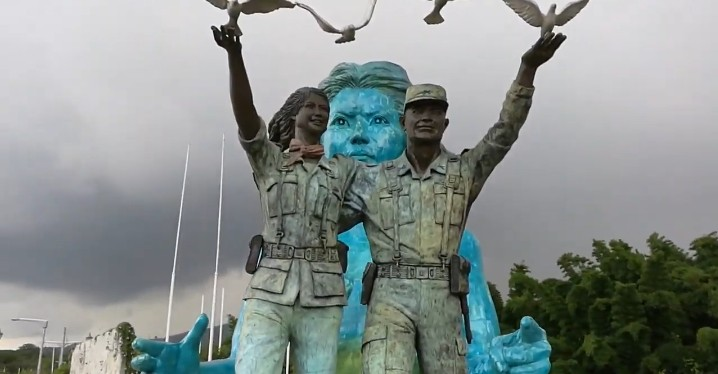
- The statues of the guerrilla fighter (left) and the soldier (right)
- Interactive map of Monument to the Reconciliation
- Location: San Salvador, El Salvador
- Coordinates: 13°41′06.75″N 89°14′57.57″W
- Designer: Napoleón Alberto Escoto
- Material: Bronze
- Opening date: 15 January 2017
- Dismantled date: 3 January 2024

The Monument to the Reconciliation (Spanish: Monumento a la Reconciliación) was a monument which existed in El Salvador from 2017 until its demolition in 2024. The monument, which was designed by sculptor Napoleón Alberto Escoto, commemorated the 25th anniversary of the signing of the Chapultepec Peace Accords which ended the Salvadoran Civil War. It was inaugurated by President Salvador Sánchez Cerén in January 2017 and was demolished by the Ministry of Public Works in January 2024.

== Description ==
The Monument to the Reconciliation was located at the intersection of the Monseñor Óscar Arnulfo Romero Boulevard and Jerusalén Boulevard in San Salvador. It was designed by Salvadoran sculptor Napoleón Alberto Escoto and was constructed by the Inclusive Cities Directorate using thousands of keys donated to the directorate by Salvadoran citizens. Volunteers from the University of El Salvador helped build the monument.

The monument consisted of three bronze statues, two which were 6 meters (20 ft) tall and one was 12 meters (39 ft) tall. The two 6-meter tall statues depicted one guerrilla fighter and one soldier; both statues had their arms interlocked and were holding out their hands which were setting free a group of pigeons made out of aluminum. The 12-meter tall statue, nicknamed "La Mater Civis", depicted a nude woman, representing the Salvadoran citizens, holding out her arms with a ring on one finger representing peace.

A 300-meter-long (984 ft) path led visitors to the monument, and the path's length represented a long and difficult path to peace. The Jaguar's Footprints Sculpture-Mural was located near the monument; it depicted El Salvador's indigenous culture, the Spanish conquest of El Salvador by Pedro de Alvarado, the "First Cry of Independence" of 1811, the presidencies of notable Salvadoran generals, various Salvadoran authors, and the then-beatified Archbishop Óscar Romero.

== History ==
=== Inauguration ===
The Monument to the Reconciliation was inaugurated on 15 January 2017 by Salvadoran President Salvador Sánchez Cerén. The monument was constructed to commemorate the 25th anniversary of the signing of the Chapultepec Peace Accords which ended the 12-year-long Salvadoran Civil War. Amnesty International applauded the opening of the monument, stating that it was an "homage to the civilians murdered or disappeared during the conflict" ("homenage a los civiles asesinados o desaparecidos durante el conflicto"); in total, around 75,000 people died during the civil war and 8,000 more disappeared. The Ministry of Public Works described the monument as "a metaphor to democracy, to the sovereignty of the people, to the country's unity, and to the solution's principle" ("una metáfora a la democracia, a la soberanía del pueblo, a la unidad de país y al principio de la solución"). Some Salvadorans reportedly questioned the monument's symbolism and objected to its appearance, with Escoto himself stating that the final monument did not entirely resemble the original plans.

=== Demolition ===
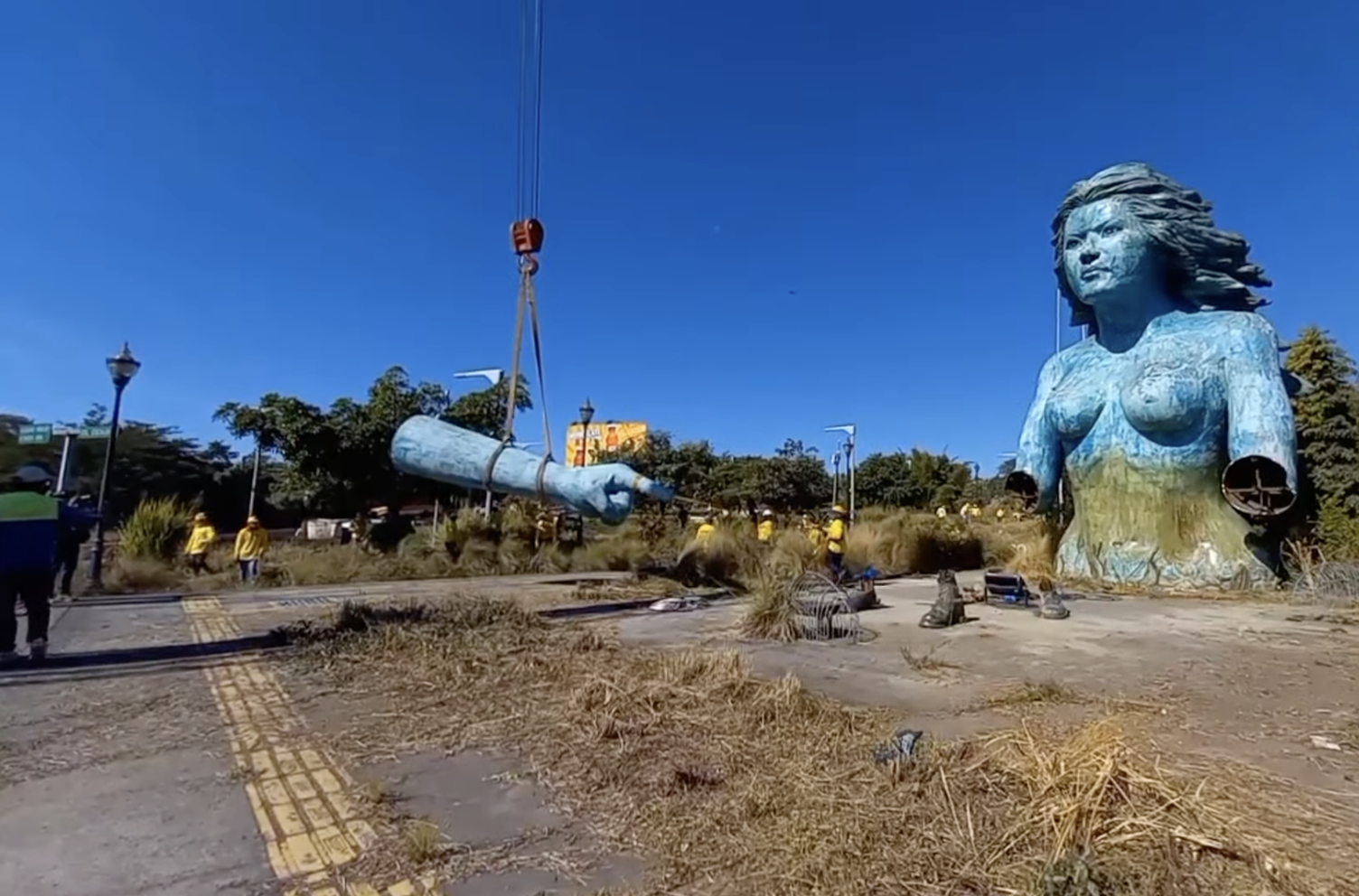
The demolition of the monument

On 4 June 2020, Salvadoran President Nayib Bukele ordered the Ministry of Public Works to demolish the Monument to the Reconciliation, stating that it was a "horrible monument". He clarified that while the monument would be demolished, the park it was located it would not be. An initial effort to demolish the monument was halted in December 2021 for unspecified reasons. The monument was demolished on 3 January 2024 by the Ministry of Public Works. Romeo Herrera, the minister of public works, stated that a new park would be built at the site the monument stood at.

Bukele posted a video of the monument's demolition on X, saying "the supposed 'monument to the reconciliation' inaugurated by the FMLN government in 2017—which not only was aesthetically horrible, but also glorified the pact between the murderers of our people to share the cake—has been demolished" ("El supuesto 'monumento a la reconciliación', inaugurado por el gobierno del FMLN en 2017 —que no solo era estéticamente horrible, sino que glorificaba el pacto entre los asesinos de nuestro pueblo para repartirse el pastel— ha sido demolido"). Herrea claimed that "this space was visited by nobody" ("este espacio no era visitado por nadie") and that it was a "monument to corruption" ("monumento a la corrupción"). Nidia Díaz, a signatory of the peace accords and former FMLN commander, criticized the monument's demolition, describing it as "anti-historical" ("antihistóricos").
