= Sex trafficking in El Salvador =

Citizen and foreign victims, including indigenous peoples, are sex trafficked into and out of the departments of El Salvador. They are raped and physically and psychologically harmed in locations within these administrative divisions.

Sex trafficking in El Salvador is human trafficking for the purpose of sexual exploitation and slavery that occurs in the Republic of El Salvador. It is a country of origin, transit, and destination for sexually trafficked persons.

El Salvador citizens and foreigners, primarily women and girls, are sex trafficked to the different departments of El Salvador, as well as other countries, namely Mexico and the United States. The illegal transporting and sexual assault of migrants from Latin America to the United States is a problem. The majority of foreign victims of sex trafficking in El Salvador come from Honduras, Nicaragua, and Guatemala. Children, deported migrants, and people in poverty are especially vulnerable to sex trafficking. Incidents have involved child pornography and sex tourism. Sex trafficked victims are deceived or abducted and forced into prostitution and unfree labour. They are guarded or locked up in brothels, homes, and other locations. Some are forced into marriages or pregnancies, and victims' babies have been sold. They are threatened and physically and psychologically abused. Victims have been tortured and murdered. Their family members are sometimes threatened. Victims contract sexually transmitted diseases from rapes without condoms. They have been deprived of water and other necessities and often live in poor and dirty conditions. A number are drugged while in captivity. Others are forced to get tattoos or breast implants. Victims experience mental health problems, including depression, suicidal thoughts, and persecutory delusions. Victims have participated in investigations and trials against their traffickers. Sex crimes against women and girls, such as these, are a form of gender inequality in El Salvador.

Sex trafficking and exploitation have permeated all levels of Salvadorian society. Traffickers have been male and female. A number of traffickers are members of or facilitated by gangs and transnational criminal organizations. Government officials and workers and police have been complicit and corruption and impunity are issues. Anti-sex trafficking efforts in the country have been criticized for being unsatisfactory.

The scale of sex trafficking in El Salvador is not known because of the dearth of data. Government anti-sex trafficking efforts and protections for citizens have been criticized for being insufficient. Law enforcement is hindered by limited operating budgets and resources. Victim care and rehabilitation programmes are lacking.

== Links to illegal drug trade ==
Drug gangs in El Salvador engage in sex trafficking as an alternative source of profit. Women and girls have been forced into sexual relationships and kept as sex slaves by gang leaders. Vulnerable young girls, with an average age of nine to 15 years old, are often targeted and recruited from schools and communities then led into a life of sexual violence and exploitation.

Research by the University of Texas Rio Grande Valley indicates that an estimated 15,000 children in Guatemala fall victim to child sex trafficking networks. In addition to sex trafficking, children in the Northern Triangle are also subjected to forced labor, such as selling drugs for the gangs, further perpetuating the cycle of exploitation. El Salvador's police reports that sexual exploitation has been involved in 97 percent of the human trafficking cases registered.

== Non-governmental organization ==
Ramá Network, part of the International Network of Consecrated Life Against Trafficking in Persons, and the Association for the Self-Determination of Salvadoran Women (AMS) carry out anti-sex trafficking efforts in El Salvador.
