= Ad Hoc Commission =

The Ad Hoc Commission was a human rights commission in El Salvador, established as part of the peace accords which ended the Salvadoran Civil War. The purpose of the commission was to examine the conduct of officers of the Armed Forces of El Salvador during the war and determine their fitness for continuing as military officers in the new regime.

The Commission was established as part of the New York agreements. It consisted of three Salvadoran civilians appointed by the Secretary General of the United Nations after consultation of the government and the FMLN.

The Commission evaluated 232 of the most senior officers and issued its report on September 22, 1992. The Commission recommended that the entire senior military establishment be discharged and replaced. Though it took time, this recommendation was eventually implemented.
