= 2012 Salvadoran legislative and local elections =

- 11 March 2012
- All 84 seats in the Legislative Assembly; 43 seats needed for a majority
- Turnout: 51.91% (▼1.67pp)
Party	Leader	Vote %	Seats	+/–
ARENA	Jorge Velado	39.76	33	+1
FMLN	Medardo González	36.76	31	−4
GANA	José Andrés Rovira	9.60	11	New
PCN	Manuel Rodríguez	7.18	7	−4
PDC		2.76	1	−4
CD		2.14	1	0
This lists parties that won seats. See the complete results below.
Results by constituency

Legislative and local elections were held in El Salvador on 11 March 2012 to choose 84 members of the legislative assembly and 262 mayors. The election was carried out by the Supreme Electoral Tribunal. The opposition Nationalist Republican Alliance (ARENA) narrowly defeated the Farabundo Martí National Liberation Front (FMLN) and its ally Grand Alliance for National Unity (GANA).

== Background ==
Following the 2009 presidential election, the first ever president from the Farabundo Martí National Liberation Front (FMLN), Mauricio Funes, was elected following the end of the Salvadoran civil war.

This election was seen as a test of Funes' government since it was the first election since he came to power. Prior to the election, the FMLN controlled the Legislative Assembly in alliance with Grand Alliance for National Unity (GANA), dissidents from the conservative Nationalist Republican Alliance (ARENA).

== Parties ==
In addition to ARENA, FMLN and GANA, six smaller parties fielded candidates. ARENA is led by Alfredo Cristiani, a former president during the civil war; FMLN is led by Medardo González, a former guerrilla chief; and GANA is led by former member of ARENA and president Elías Antonio Saca.

The National Conciliation Party and the Christian Democratic Party were both dissolved by a Supreme Court of Justice verdict in 2011. Technically, they would have been deregistered after their electoral setback in 2004 (less than 3%), but a 2005 decree saved them from being folded and allowed them to carry on. The Supreme Court ruled this decree to be unconstitutional and eventually disbanded the parties. However, both parties continued their political work and registered as the National Coalition and Party of Hope, respectively.

== Campaign ==
ARENA's campaign issues included a tough response to criminal and youth gangs, which was a concern with 14 murders a day, according to government figures. FMLN campaigned on promises of social programmes and job creation, where unemployment is 34% (though down from 40% before Funes took office).

In January, Funes appointed army General Francisco Salinas to replace Carlos Ascencio, who had resigned to join the foreign service, as head of the national police. For this, Funes was criticised by members of his own party who alleged that appointing someone from the military to head the police was in contravention of both the Constitution of El Salvador and the Chapultepec Peace Accords.

== Opinion polls ==
The Central American University carried out an opinion poll which showed the FMLN alliance was leading with 27.8%, but closely followed by ARENA with 26.4%. According to a CID-Gallup poll for the daily newspaper La Página, carried out from 16 to 19 February, ARENA had the support of 34% of voters, FMLN followed with 32% of the voters and GANA, a faction of ARENA, was third with 10% of the voters.

== Results ==
The voting stations were scheduled to open from 7:00 to 17:00, but many opened late. After voting, Funes called on the electorate to help him "guarantee that the changes that are taking place are strengthened, and not turned back."

=== Legislative election ===
Party	Votes	%	Seats	+/–
Nationalist Republican Alliance	897,054	39.80	33	+1
Farabundo Martí National Liberation Front	827,522	36.72	31	–4
Grand Alliance for National Unity	217,447	9.65	11	New
National Coalition Party	163,209	7.24	7	–4
Party of Hope	61,772	2.74	1	–4
Democratic Change	47,747	2.12	1	0
National Liberal Party	14,071	0.62	0	New
Popular Party	11,132	0.49	0	New
Independents	13,742	0.61	0	New
Total	2,253,696	100.00	84	0
Valid votes	2,253,696	95.11		
Invalid/blank votes	115,754	4.89		
Total votes	2,369,450	100.00		
Registered voters/turnout	4,564,969	51.91		
Source: Election Resources, TSE

=== Municipal elections ===
The election also chose mayors of 262 towns and cities.

After the polls closed, but before the Supreme Electoral Tribunal had published the official results, ARENA candidate and the incumbent mayor Norman Quijano declared himself winner of the mayoral race in the capital, San Salvador. He beat the FMLN's Jorge Shafick Handal, the son of former FMLN leader Schafik Handal.

Of the 14 district capitals, ARENA won control of nine town halls, FMLN won control of three town halls, while GANA and the National Coalition each won control of one town hall.

Party	Votes	%	Mayors	+/–
Nationalist Republican Alliance	896,892	38.80	116	–6
Farabundo Martí National Liberation Front	807,644	34.94	94	+1
Grand Alliance for National Unity	265,358	11.48	17	New
National Coalition Party	204,212	8.83	27	–6
Party of Hope	74,823	3.24	5	–7
Democratic Change	50,048	2.17	3	+2
National Liberal Party	9,660	0.42	0	New
Popular Party	1,408	0.06	0	New
Salvadoran Patriotic Fraternity	1,366	0.06	0	New
Total	2,311,411	100.00	262	0
Valid votes	2,311,411	97.43		
Invalid/blank votes	61,090	2.57		
Total votes	2,372,501	100.00		
Registered voters/turnout	4,564,969	51.97		

==== By municipality ====
Departments	Municipalities	Mayor	Party	Margin	%
San Salvador	San Salvador**	Norman Quijano*	ARENA	52,588	
San Salvador	Ciudad Delgado		FMLN/CD***	347	
San Salvador	Mejicanos		ARENA	599	
San Salvador	Soyapango		ARENA	267	
San Salvador	Cuscatancingo		FMLN	3,342	
San Salvador	San Marcos		FMLN	514	
San Salvador	Ilopango		ARENA	668	
San Salvador	Nejapa		FMLN	248	
San Salvador	Apopa		ARENA	3,107	
San Salvador	San Martin		ARENA	406	
San Salvador	Panchimalco		FMLN	2,947	
San Salvador	Aguilares		FMLN/CD***	91	
San Salvador	Tonacatepeque		ARENA	2,495	
San Salvador	Santo Tomás		ARENA	1,811	47.73%
San Salvador	Santiago Texacuangos		ARENA	1,029	
San Salvador	El Paisnal		FMLN	1,279	60.43%
San Salvador	Guazapa		CN	800	
San Salvador	Ayutuxtepeque		ARENA	416	
San Salvador	Rosario de Mora		FMLN	637	
Santa Ana	Santa Ana**		FMLN/CD***	399	
Santa Ana	Chalchuapa		FMLN	2,831	
Santa Ana	Metapán		CN	2,101	
Santa Ana	Coatepeque		ARENA	992	
Santa Ana	El Congo		CN	466	
Santa Ana	Texistepeque		PES	361	36.69%
Santa Ana	Candelaria de la Frontera		ARENA	4,208	
Santa Ana	San Sebastián Salitrillo		FMLN	355	
Santa Ana	Santa Rosa Guachipilín		ARENA	91	
Santa Ana	Santiago de la Frontera		ARENA	905	
Santa Ana	El Porvenir		CN	486	
Santa Ana	Masahuat		CN	187	
Santa Ana	San Antonio Pajonal		ARENA	377	57.22%
San Miguel	San Miguel**		GANA	7,307	
San Miguel	Chinameca		ARENA	971	
San Miguel	El Tránsito		FMLN	486	38.07%
San Miguel	Ciudad Barrios		PES	883	35.5%
San Miguel	Chirilagua		ARENA	299	47.45%
San Miguel	Sesori		CN/PES***	8	
San Miguel	San Rafael Oriente		GANA	262	32.99%
San Miguel	Moncagua		FMLN	1,231	
San Miguel	Lolotique		FMLN	132	33.09%
San Miguel	San Jorge		FMLN	394	
San Miguel	Chapeltique		CD	885	42.69%
San Miguel	San Gerardo		ARENA	8	49.92%
San Miguel	Carolina		ARENA	407	53.74%
San Miguel	Quelepa		FMLN	368	53.31%
San Miguel	San Luis de la Reina		FMLN	413	52.09%
San Miguel	Nuevo Edén de San Juan		ARENA	12	
San Miguel	Nueva Guadalupe		FMLN	138	35.31%
San Miguel	Uluazapa		FMLN	51	49.86%
San Miguel	Comacarán		FMLN	783	69.3%
San Miguel	San Antonio del Mosco		ARENA	560	
La Libertad	Santa Tecla**		FMLN/CD***	648	
La Libertad	Quezaltepeque		ARENA	164	
La Libertad	Ciudad Arce		FMLN/CD***	167	52.86%
La Libertad	San Juan Opico		ARENA	1,163	
La Libertad	Colón		ARENA	4,527	
La Libertad	La Libertad		FMLN/PES***	731	
La Libertad	Antiguo Cuscatlán		ARENA	9,666	74.34%
La Libertad	Comasagua		FMLN	356	42.14%
La Libertad	San Pablo Tacachico		FMLN	285	
La Libertad	Jayaque		ARENA	887	56.53%
La Libertad	Huizúcar		ARENA	690	53.45%
La Libertad	Tepecoyo		GANA	403	
La Libertad	Teotepeque		ARENA	1,090	
La Libertad	Chiltiupán		ARENA	1,377	62.23%
La Libertad	Nuevo Cuscatlán	Nayib Bukele	FMLN/CD***	108	
La Libertad	Tamanique		ARENA	1,520	52.18%
La Libertad	Sacacoyo		ARENA	1,422	59.87%
La Libertad	San José Villanueva		CN	420	35.61%
La Libertad	Zaragoza		CN	42	
La Libertad	Talnique		ARENA	978	
La Libertad	San Matías		ARENA	672	50.94%
La Libertad	Jicalapa		ARENA	1,175	
Usulután	Usulután**		CN	82	
Usulután	Jiquilisco		FMLN	4,469	
Usulután	Berlín		CN	267	
Usulután	Santiago de María		CN	553	
Usulután	Jucuapa		FMLN	510	
Usulután	Santa Elena ·		FMLN	1,074	
Usulután	Jucuarán		FMLN	282	39.64%
Usulután	San Agustín		FMLN	329	53.75%
Usulután	Ozatlán		FMLN	210	50.37%
Usulután	Estanzuelas		FMLN	60	39.38%
Usulután	Mercedes Umaña		FMLN	378	
Usulután	Alegría		FMLN	1,591	
Usulután	Concepción Batres		FMLN	412	
Usulután	San Francisco Javier		FMLN	76	
Usulután	Puerto El Triunfo		CD	371	
Usulután	Tecapán		FMLN	36	50.26%
Usulután	San Dionisio		ARENA	492	43.76%
Usulután	Ereguayquín		ARENA	339	52.35%
Usulután	Santa María		ARENA	747	
Usulután	Nueva Granada		ARENA	435	55.12%
Usulután	El Triunfo·		ARENA	549	49.3%
Usulután	San Buenaventura		FMLN	250	
Usulután	California		ARENA	507	70.45%
Sonsonate	Sonsonate**		ARENA	7,206	
Sonsonate	Izalco		ARENA	597	
Sonsonate	Acajutla		FMLN	3,014	
Sonsonate	Armenia		ARENA	4,082	63.96%
Sonsonate	Nahuizalco		FMLN	2,901	41.85%
Sonsonate	Juayúa		CN	1,171	27.76%
Sonsonate	San Julián		FMLN	394	37.17%
Sonsonate	Sonzacate		ARENA	765	
Sonsonate	San Antonio del Monte		CD	679	
Sonsonate	Nahuilingo		ARENA	565	
Sonsonate	Cuisnahuat		FMLN	38	36.09%
Sonsonate	Santa Catarina Masahuat		FMLN/CD***	203	
Sonsonate	Caluco		CN	749	41.96%
Sonsonate	Santa Isabel Ishuatán		ARENA	818	
Sonsonate	Salcoatitán		PES	122	27.3%
Sonsonate	Santo Domingo de Guzman		CN	108	
La Unión	La Unión**		ARENA	2,698	
La Unión	Santa Rosa de Lima		ARENA	217	
La Unión	Pasaquina		GANA	48	
La Unión	San Alejo		ARENA	1,068	
La Unión	Anamorós		FMLN	126	
La Unión	El Carmen		GANA	519	37.42%
La Unión	Conchagua		ARENA	142	39.36%
La Unión	El Sauce		GANA	25	34.91%
La Unión	Lislique		ARENA	1,677	
La Unión	Yucuaiquín		ARENA	188	
La Unión	Nueva Esparta		ARENA	175	40.54%
La Unión	Polorós		ARENA	306	
La Unión	Bolivar		ARENA	775	62.43%
La Unión	Concepción de Oriente ·		ARENA	409	49.74%
La Unión	Intipucá		ARENA	369	46.69%
La Unión	San Jose las Fuentes		ARENA	100	
La Unión	Yayantique		ARENA	637	44.24%
La Unión	Meanguera del Golfo		ARENA	227	58.64%
La Paz	Zacatecoluca**		FMLN	5,084	
La Paz	Santiago Nonualco		GANA	481	
La Paz	San Juan Nonualco		ARENA	295	
La Paz	San Pedro Masahuat		FMLN	905	
La Paz	Olocuilta		ARENA	1,920	
La Paz	San Pedro Nonualco		FMLN	265	
La Paz	San Francisco Chinameca		ARENA	188	39.35%
La Paz	San Juan Talpa		GANA	590	
La Paz	El Rosario		FMLN	419	
La Paz	San Rafael Obrajuelo		ARENA	1,188	
La Paz	Santa María Ostuma		ARENA	632	
La Paz	San Luis Talpa		GANA	1,222	
La Paz	San Antonio Masahuat		ARENA	184	39.87%
La Paz	San Miguel Tepezontes		CN	60	
La Paz	San Juan Tepezontes		CN	34	48.1%
La Paz	Tapalhuaca		FMLN	292	43.27%
La Paz	Cuyultitán		ARENA	49	32.47%
La Paz	Paraíso de Osorio		CN	1	47.21%
La Paz	San Emigdio		FMLN	12	35.67%
La Paz	Jerusalén		FMLN	237	56.56%
La Paz	Mercedes La Ceiba		GANA	428	71.01%
La Paz	San Luis La Herradura		FMLN	1,521	
Chalatenango	Chalatenango**		ARENA	439	
Chalatenango	Nueva Concepción		FMLN	81	41.17%
Chalatenango	La Palma		FMLN	261	
Chalatenango	Tejutla		CN	882	
Chalatenango	La Reina		CN	395	
Chalatenango	Arcatao		FMLN	223	
Chalatenango	San Ignacio		ARENA	256	
Chalatenango	Dulce Nombre de María		ARENA	42	42.06%
Chalatenango	Citalá		ARENA	1,030	59.28%
Chalatenango	Agua Caliente		ARENA	352	38.2%
Chalatenango	Concepción Quezaltepeque		FMLN	222	52.01%
Chalatenango	Nueva Trinidad		FMLN	364	68.09%
Chalatenango	Las Vueltas		FMLN	630	86%
Chalatenango	Comalapa		ARENA	458	58.11%
Chalatenango	San Rafael		ARENA	39	27.53%
Chalatenango	Las Flores		FMLN	611	88.25%
Chalatenango	Ojos de Agua		ARENA	348	41.02%
Chalatenango	Nombre de Jesús		FMLN	392	57.96%
Chalatenango	Potonico		ARENA	11	50.04%
Chalatenango	San Francisco Morazán		ARENA	134	39.22%
Chalatenango	Santa Rita		ARENA	606	62.21%
Chalatenango	La Laguna		ARENA	168	
Chalatenango	San Isidro Labrador		FMLN	158	71.34%
Chalatenango	San Antonio de la Cruz		FMLN	130	55.34%
Chalatenango	El Paraíso		ARENA	124	37.45%
Chalatenango	San Miguel de Mercedes		CN	805	75.43%
Chalatenango	San Luis del Carmen		FMLN	143	50.07%
Chalatenango	San José Cancasque		FMLN	42	50.94%
Chalatenango	San Antonio Los Ranchos		FMLN	306	76.37%
Chalatenango	El Carrizal		FMLN	329	59.53%
Chalatenango	San Fernando		ARENA	60	52.25%
Chalatenango	Azacualpa		FMLN	142	58.15%
Chalatenango	San Francisco Lempa		FMLN	21	36.95%
Cuscatlán	Cojutepeque**		ARENA	3,079	
Cuscatlán	Suchitoto		FMLN	3,730	
Cuscatlán	San Pedro Perulapán		FMLN	3,337	43.4%
Cuscatlán	San José Guayabal		ARENA	751	52.88%
Cuscatlán	Tenancingo		FMLN	133	44.4%
Cuscatlán	San Rafael Cedros		ARENA	291	
Cuscatlán	Candelaria		CN	1,745	
Cuscatlán	El Carmen		ARENA	799	49.98%
Cuscatlán	Monte San Juan		PES	605	34.51%
Cuscatlán	San Cristobal		ARENA	398	
Cuscatlán	Santa Cruz Michapa		CN	141	36.99%
Cuscatlán	San Bartolomé Perulapía		FMLN	146	
Cuscatlán	San Ramon		ARENA	40	41.2%
Cuscatlán	El Rosario		ARENA	315	44.9%
Cuscatlán	Oratorio de Concepción		CN	139	35.6%
Cuscatlán	Santa Cruz Analquito		GANA	464	61.41%
Ahuachapán	Ahuachapán**		ARENA	5,395	
Ahuachapán	Atiquizaya		ARENA	1,049	
Ahuachapán	San Francisco Menéndez		PES	1,188	
Ahuachapán	Tacuba		ARENA	167	
Ahuachapán	Concepción de Ataco		ARENA	1,229	54.55%
Ahuachapán	Jujutla		ARENA	2,398	
Ahuachapán	Guaymango		FMLN	1,793	
Ahuachapán	Apaneca		ARENA	944	
Ahuachapán	San Pedro Puxtla		FMLN/CD***	8	50.36%
Ahuachapán	San Lorenzo		FMLN	434	
Ahuachapán	Turín		CN	1,390	
Ahuachapán	El Refugio		ARENA	493	42.68%
Morazán	San Francisco Gotera**		ARENA	3,210	56.94%
Morazán	Jocoro		FMLN	796	
Morazán	Corinto		ARENA	1,305	54.08%
Morazán	Sociedad		FMLN	450	
Morazán	Cacaopera		FMLN	280	
Morazán	Guatajiagua		ARENA	259	34.09%
Morazán	El Divisadero		FMLN	907	
Morazán	Jocoaitique		ARENA	108	52.06%
Morazán	Osicala		GANA	436	
Morazán	Chilanga		ARENA	407	
Morazán	Meanguera		FMLN	573	
Morazán	Torola		FMLN	30	
Morazán	San Simon		FMLN	461	42%
Morazán	Delicias de Concepción		GANA	24	49.6%
Morazán	Joateca		GANA	78	50.38%
Morazán	Arambala		FMLN	133	40.09%
Morazán	Lolotiquillo		ARENA	416	55.02%
Morazán	Yamabal		ARENA	69	37.76%
Morazán	Yoloaiquín		ARENA	714	
Morazán	San Carlos		ARENA	461	51.99%
Morazán	El Rosario		GANA	8	39.24%
Morazán	Perquín		FMLN	178	41.59%
Morazán	Sensembra		ARENA	271	
Morazán	Gualococti		ARENA	195	45.3%
Morazán	San Fernando		GANA	134	
Morazán	San Isidro		FMLN	237	50.94%
San Vicente	San Vicente**		ARENA	6,386	
San Vicente	Tecoluca		FMLN	1,025	
San Vicente	San Sebastián		ARENA	1,210	53.54%
San Vicente	Apastepeque		GANA	1,356	
San Vicente	San Esteban Catarina		FMLN	507	
San Vicente	San Ildefonso		FMLN	93	
San Vicente	Santa Clara		FMLN	119	52.28%
San Vicente	San Lorenzo		FMLN	371	
San Vicente	Verapaz		FMLN	132	
San Vicente	Guadalupe		CN/PES***	4	
San Vicente	Santo Domingo		CN/PES***	7	
San Vicente	San Cayetano Istepeque		ARENA	69	49.28%
San Vicente	Tepetitán		FMLN	74	40.46%
Cabañas	Sensuntepeque**		ARENA	5,394	
Cabañas	Ilobasco		ARENA	2,780	48.35%
Cabañas	Victoria		ARENA	722	
Cabañas	San Isidro		ARENA	641	42.71
Cabañas	Jutiapa		ARENA	1,275	63.74%
Cabañas	Tejutepeque		ARENA	169	
Cabañas	Dolores		ARENA	84	50.44%
Cabañas	Cinquera		FMLN	39	49.45%
Cabañas	Guacotecti		CN	280	34.39%
*Incumbent. **Department capitals. ***Joint candidates.
Totals	262				
Source: Supreme Electoral Tribunal (pdf)

== Reaction ==
San Salvador's re-elected mayor Norman Quijano called the result "historic" and announced that the party was "going to turn the country around."

== Analysis ==
A strong showing for ARENA was read as a hindrance to Funes' implementation of his social programmes.

The president and his FMLN administration are likely to be dependent on the support of GANA, which has already helped the government with passing fiscal reform bills during the last legislators' term. The Christian Science Monitor read the result as a "litmus test" for President Mauricio Funes before the next presidential election.
