= List of municipalities and districts of El Salvador =

Administration Territory of El Salvador

District map

Municipality map

The municipalities of El Salvador, called municipios, are administrative subdivisions of each of the 14 departamentos of El Salvador and are a total of 44.

== Redistricting ==
Prior to May 2024, El Salvador had 262 municipalities. Each of the 14 departamentos had a variable number of municipios, one of which was the departamento's capital. These municipios were made up of cantons which in turn contained a variable number of caseríos (hamlets).

In June 2023, President Nayib Bukele proposed the reduction of municipal councils to 44, with former municipalities becoming districts. The proposal was approved on 13 June 2023 by the Legislative Assembly and went into effect on 1 May 2024.

The country now has 14 departamentos, 44 municipios and 262 districts.

== List of municipalities and districts ==
The quantity of municipalities and districts in each of the 14 departments of El Salvador is the following:

== Ahuachapán Department ==
- Northern Ahuachapán
  - Atiquizaya
  - El Refugio
  - San Lorenzo
  - Turín
- Central Ahuachapán
  - Ahuachapán
  - Apaneca
  - Concepción de Ataco
  - Tacuba
- Southern Ahuachapán
  - Guaymango
  - Jujutla
  - San Francisco Menéndez
  - San Pedro Puxtla

== Cabañas Department ==
- Western Cabañas
  - Cinquera
  - Ilobasco
  - Jutiapa
  - Tejutepeque
- Eastern Cabañas
  - Dolores
  - Guacotecti
  - Sensuntepeque
  - San Isidro
  - Victoria

== Chalatenango Department ==
- Northern Chalatenango
  - La Palma
  - Citalá
  - San Ignacio
- Central Chalatenango
  - Agua Caliente
  - Dulce Nombre de María
  - El Paraíso
  - La Reina
  - Nueva Concepción
  - San Fernando
  - San Francisco Morazán
  - San Rafael
  - Santa Rita
  - Tejutla
- Southern Chalatenango
  - Arcatao
  - Azacualpa
  - Chalatenango
  - Comalapa
  - Concepción Quezaltepeque
  - El Carrizal
  - La Laguna
  - Las Flores
  - Las Vueltas
  - Nombre de Jesús
  - Nueva Trinidad
  - Ojos de Agua
  - Potonico
  - San Antonio de la Cruz
  - San Antonio Los Ranchos
  - San Francisco Lempa
  - San Isidro Labrador
  - San José Cancasque
  - San Luis del Carmen
  - San Miguel de Mercedes

== Cuscatlán Department ==
- Northern Cuscatlán
  - Oratorio de Concepción
  - San Bartolomé Perulapía
  - San José Guayabal
  - San Pedro Perulapán
  - Suchitoto
- Southern Cuscatlán
  - Candelaria
  - Cojutepeque
  - El Carmen
  - El Rosario
  - Monte San Juan
  - San Cristóbal
  - San Rafael Cedros
  - San Ramón
  - Santa Cruz Analquito
  - Santa Cruz Michapa
  - Tenancingo

== La Libertad Department ==
- Northern La Libertad
  - Quezaltepeque
  - San Matías
  - San Pablo Tacachico
- Central La Libertad
  - Ciudad Arce
  - San Juan Opico
- Western La Libertad
  - Colón
  - Jayaque
  - Sacacoyo
  - Talnique
  - Tepecoyo
- Eastern La Libertad
  - Antiguo Cuscatlán
  - Huizúcar
  - Nuevo Cuscatlán
  - San José Villanueva
  - Zaragoza
- Coastal La Libertad
  - Chiltiupán
  - Jicalapa
  - La Libertad
  - Tamanique
  - Teotepeque
- Southern La Libertad
  - Comasagua
  - Santa Tecla

== La Paz Department ==
- Western La Paz
  - Cuyultitán
  - Olocuilta
  - San Francisco Chinameca
  - San Juan Talpa
  - San Luis Talpa
  - San Pedro Masahuat
  - Tapalhuaca
- Central La Paz
  - El Rosario
  - Jerusalén
  - Mercedes La Ceiba
  - Paraíso de Osorio
  - San Antonio Masahuat
  - San Emigdio
  - San Juan Tepezontes
  - San Luis La Herradura
  - San Miguel Tepezontes
  - San Pedro Nonualco
  - Santa María Ostuma
  - Santiago Nonualco
- Eastern La Paz
  - San Juan Nonualco
  - San Rafael Obrajuelo
  - Zacatecoluca

== La Unión Department ==
- Northern La Unión
  - Anamorós
  - Bolívar
  - Concepción de Oriente
  - El Sauce
  - Lislique
  - Nueva Esparta
  - Pasaquina
  - Polorós
  - San José
  - Santa Rosa de Lima
- Southern La Unión
  - Conchagua
  - El Carmen
  - Intipucá
  - La Unión
  - Meanguera del Golfo
  - San Alejo
  - Yayantique
  - Yucuaiquín

== Morazán Department ==
- Northern Morazán
  - Arambala
  - Cacaopera
  - Corinto
  - El Rosario
  - Joateca
  - Jocoaitique
  - Meanguera
  - Perquín
  - San Fernando
  - San Isidro
  - Torola
- Southern Morazán
  - Chilanga
  - Delicias de Concepción
  - El Divisadero
  - Gualococti
  - Guatajiagua
  - Jocoro
  - Lolotiquillo
  - Osicala
  - San Carlos
  - San Francisco Gotera
  - San Simón
  - Sensembra
  - Sociedad
  - Yamabal
  - Yoloaiquín

== San Miguel Department ==
- Northern San Miguel
  - Carolina
  - Chapeltique
  - Ciudad Barrios
  - Nuevo Edén de San Juan
  - San Antonio
  - San Gerardo
  - San Luis de la Reina
  - Sesori
- Central San Miguel
  - Chirilagua
  - Comacarán
  - Moncagua
  - Quelepa
  - Uluazapa
  - San Miguel
- Western San Miguel
  - Chinameca
  - El Tránsito
  - Lolotique
  - Nueva Guadalupe
  - San Jorge
  - San Rafael Oriente

== San Salvador Department ==
- Northern San Salvador
  - Aguilares
  - El Paisnal
  - Guazapa
- Western San Salvador
  - Apopa
  - Nejapa
- Eastern San Salvador
  - Cuscatancingo
  - Delgado
  - Ilopango
  - San Martín
  - Soyapango
  - Tonacatepeque
- Central San Salvador
  - Ayutuxtepeque
  - Mejicanos
  - San Marcos
  - San Salvador
  - Santiago Texacuangos
  - Santo Tomás
- Southern San Salvador
  - Panchimalco
  - Rosario de Mora

== San Vicente Department ==
- Northern San Vicente
  - Apastepeque
  - San Esteban Catarina
  - San Ildefonso
  - San Lorenzo
  - San Sebastián
  - Santa Clara
  - Santo Domingo
- Southern San Vicente
  - Guadalupe
  - San Cayetano Istepeque
  - San Vicente
  - Tecoluca
  - Tepetitán
  - Verapaz

== Santa Ana Department ==
- Northern Santa Ana
  - Masahuat
  - Metapán
  - Santa Rosa Guachipilín
  - Texistepeque
- Central Santa Ana
- Eastern Santa Ana
  - Coatepeque
  - El Congo
- Western Santa Ana
  - Candelaria de la Frontera
  - Chalchuapa
  - El Porvenir
  - San Antonio Pajonal
  - San Sebastián Salitrillo
  - Santiago de la Frontera

== Sonsonate Department ==
- Northern Sonsonate
  - Juayúa
  - Nahuizalco
  - Salcoatitán
  - Santa Catarina Masahuat
- Central Sonsonate
  - Nahulingo
  - San Antonio del Monte
  - Sonsonate
  - Santo Domingo de Guzmán
  - Sonzacate
- Eastern Sonsonate
  - Armenia
  - Caluco
  - Cuisnahuat
  - Izalco
  - San Julián
  - Santa Isabel Ishuatán
- Acajutla (Western Sonsonate)

== Usulután Department ==
- Northern Usulután
  - Alegría
  - Berlín
  - El Triunfo
  - Estanzuelas
  - Jucuapa
  - Mercedes Umaña
  - Nueva Granada
  - San Buenaventura
  - Santiago de María
- Eastern Usulután
  - California
  - Concepción Batres
  - Ereguayquín
  - Jucuarán
  - Ozatlán
  - San Dionisio
  - Santa Elena
  - Santa María
  - Tecapán
  - Usulután
- Western Usulután
  - Jiquilisco
  - Puerto El Triunfo
  - San Francisco Javier
  - San Agustín

== See also ==
- Departments of El Salvador
- Geography of El Salvador
- List of cities in El Salvador
