= Prodetur =

Tourism in El Salvador

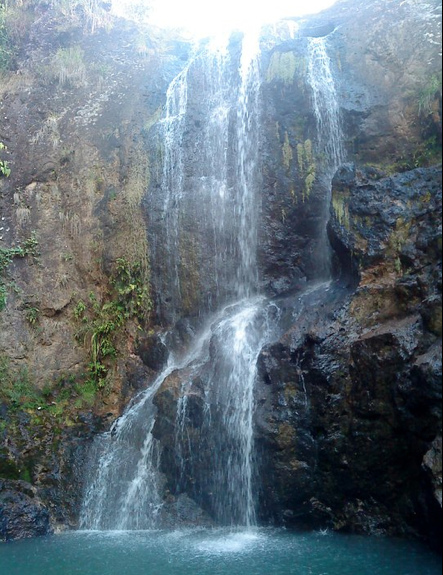
Llano del Muerto waterfall in Perquin

Prodetur is an ecotourism organization, directed and managed by Luis Diaz Martinez, and is headquartered in the village of Perquin in the Morazán Province of El Salvador. Prodetur directs tourist activities in Morazán which ensure the continuity of the Rio Sapo preservation initiative.

== Historical background ==
The department of Morazán was the site of some of the fiercest fighting during the Salvadoran civil war of 1980-1992. It was also the scene of the conflict's most notorious massacre, in the village of El Mozote. Perquín was long a rebel stronghold, and sometimes designated the FMLN's unofficial capital. The war had an ambivalent effect on the region's natural ecosystem: on the one hand, the combat was a source of widespread destruction; on the other hand, it prevented significant urbanization.

== Purpose ==
Prodetur oversees the conservation and management of 6,000 hectares along the Rio Sapo in Morazán Department, located in the northeast of El Salvador. The Rio Sapo area is particularly significant due to the ecosystem surrounding it, which includes several pine forests, 84 species of threatened flora and fauna, and 24 species of endangered fauna. Part of Prodetur’s purpose is to ensure the protection of these rare species by constant monitoring.

The protection of the Rio Sapo area was initiated in 2000 but also included the installment of tourist services, such as those offered by Prodetur. Since then Prodetur has attracted tourist attention while at the same time stressing a community-wide conservation and management of the natural resources. The protection of the Rio Sapo area is ensured through development of environmentally-friendly infrastructure, environmental education, research of the Rio Sapo ecosystem, and the use of clean technologies.

== Donors and development initiatives ==
The funds to implement Prodetur programs are provided by the Fund Initiative of the Americas, Program of Small Donations, the World Fund for the Environment, and the Binational Program of Frontier Development. Under the Binational Program of Frontier Development which was implemented in 2005, both Honduras and El Salvador created nuclei of development along the border provinces. Nucleus of Local Development number three, located in Morazán, has largely been a tourism initiative, of which Prodetur is a part. Prodetur, in coordination with bordering municipalities in Honduras, has developed a series of programs that integrate the southern part of Honduras and the department of Morazán. Central to this tourism initiative is a series of services offered by Prodetur and Morazán province, such as food, lodging, transportation, and various outdoor/recreation activities, including, but not limited to, mountain biking, bird-watching, nature walks, hiking, camping, and swimming.

== Location and collaboration ==
Prodetur operates in villages and hamlets along one of the most historically significant roads in Morazán. The Ruta de la Paz Lenca was a road of strategic importance, militarily and economically, during the Salvadoran Civil War which lasted from 1980 to 1992. Subsequently, the north of Morazán has become an important tourist destination for its historic sites from the civil war. Prodetur has utilized this increasing tourist attention to Morazán by directing these tourists to local businesses for their accommodations. In this way, the local post-war economy benefits from the tourist activity as well. Prodetur’s operation benefits the communities along the Ruta de Paz, including Perquín, Arambala, Joacaitique, San Fernando, Joateca, Meanguera, El Rosario, Torola, Guatajiagua, Cacaopera and Maroon. Prodetur and the local businesses of these towns, together, offer tourists guided tours of natural and historic attractions, lodging, meals, recreational activities, and transportation to/from sites.
