= Osicala =

- District
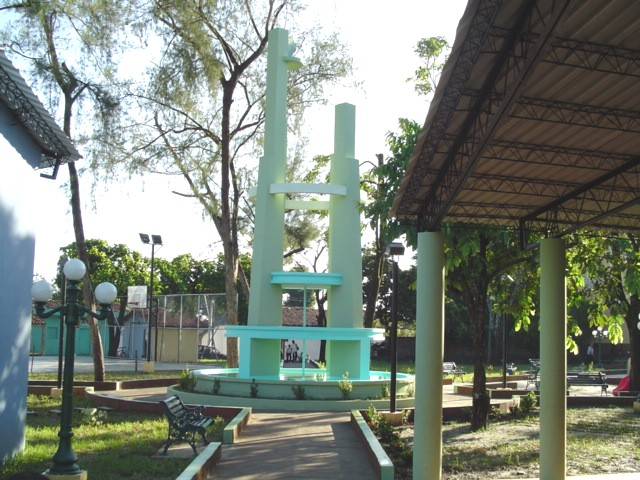

- Location in El Salvador
- Coordinates: 13°48′N 88°09′W
- Country: El Salvador
- Department: Morazán Department

Area
  - Total: 18.17 sq mi (47.05 km^{2})
- Elevation: 1,693 ft (516 m)

Population
  - Total: 10,327

Osicala is a district in Morazán Department, Republic of El Salvador. It is 184 km (114 mi) from the capital, San Salvador, on one of the hills north of Cerro Cacahuatique (Cacahuatique Mount). It borders Meanguera to the north, southeast with Delicias de Concepción, and west with Gualococti. Its climate, due to its elevation, has moderate temperatures (15–20 °C; 59–68 °F) most of the year.

== Economy ==
People there are dedicated to agriculture. Over the land they grow corn, agave and coffee. Some fruit trees like mangoes, bananas, oranges and limes are also grown.

== Rivers ==
- Torola
- Osicala
- Quebrada Honda
