= Partido Nacional Liberal =

Partido Nacional Liberal can refer to:

- National Liberal Party (El Salvador)
- National Liberal Party (Panama)
