= San Carlos Municipality =

San Carlos Municipality may refer to:

- San Carlos Municipality, Santa Cruz, Bolivia
- San Carlos Municipality, Antioquia, Colombia
- San Carlos, Córdoba, Colombia
- San Carlos, Morazán, El Salvador
- San Carlos Municipality, Tamaulipas, Mexico
- San Carlos, Río San Juan, Nicaragua
- San Carlos Municipality, Cojedes, Venezuela
