= Sensembra =

- District
- Location in El Salvador
- Coordinates: 13°40′N 88°10′W
- Country: El Salvador
- Department: Morazán Department
- Elevation: 843 ft (257 m)

Population (2024)
  - District: 2,602
  - Rank: 238th in El Salvador
  - Density: 57/sq mi (22/km^{2})
  - Rural: 2,602

Sensembra is a municipality in the Morazán department of El Salvador.
