= Yoloaiquín =

- District
- Location in El Salvador
- Coordinates: 13°46′N 88°09′W
- Country: El Salvador
- Department: Morazán Department
- Elevation: 2,375 ft (724 m)

Population (2024)
  - District: 3,142
  - Rank: 228th in El Salvador
  - Rural: 3,142

Yoloaiquín is a municipality in the Morazán department of El Salvador.
