= Guaymango =

- District
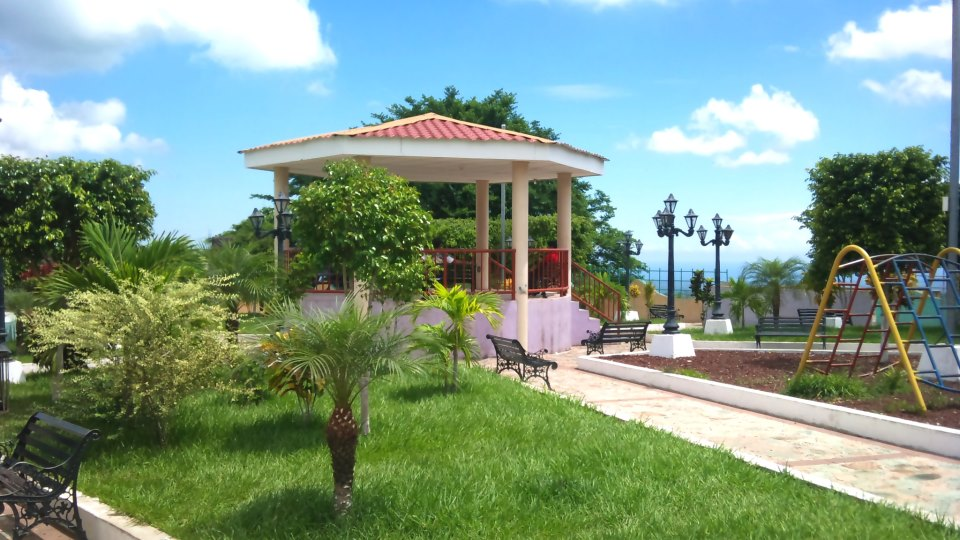

- Location in El Salvador
- Coordinates: 13°45′N 89°50′W
- Country: El Salvador
- Department: Ahuachapán
- Municipality: Ahuachapán Sur

Area
  - District: 23.25 sq mi (60.23 km^{2})
- Elevation: 1,106 ft (337 m)

Population (2024)
  - District: 21,607
  - Rank: 67th in El Salvador
  - Density: 929.1/sq mi (358.7/km^{2})
  - Urban: 10,198
  - Rural: 11,409

Guaymango is a district in the Ahuachapán Department of El Salvador.
