= Jicalapa =

- District
- Location in El Salvador
- Coordinates: 13°33′N 89°30′W
- Country: El Salvador
- Department: La Libertad
- Elevation: 920 ft (280 m)

Population (2024)
  - District: 6,312
  - Rank: 180th in El Salvador
  - Rural: 6,312

Jicalapa is a municipality in the La Libertad department of El Salvador.
