= Santa María Ostuma =

- Municipality
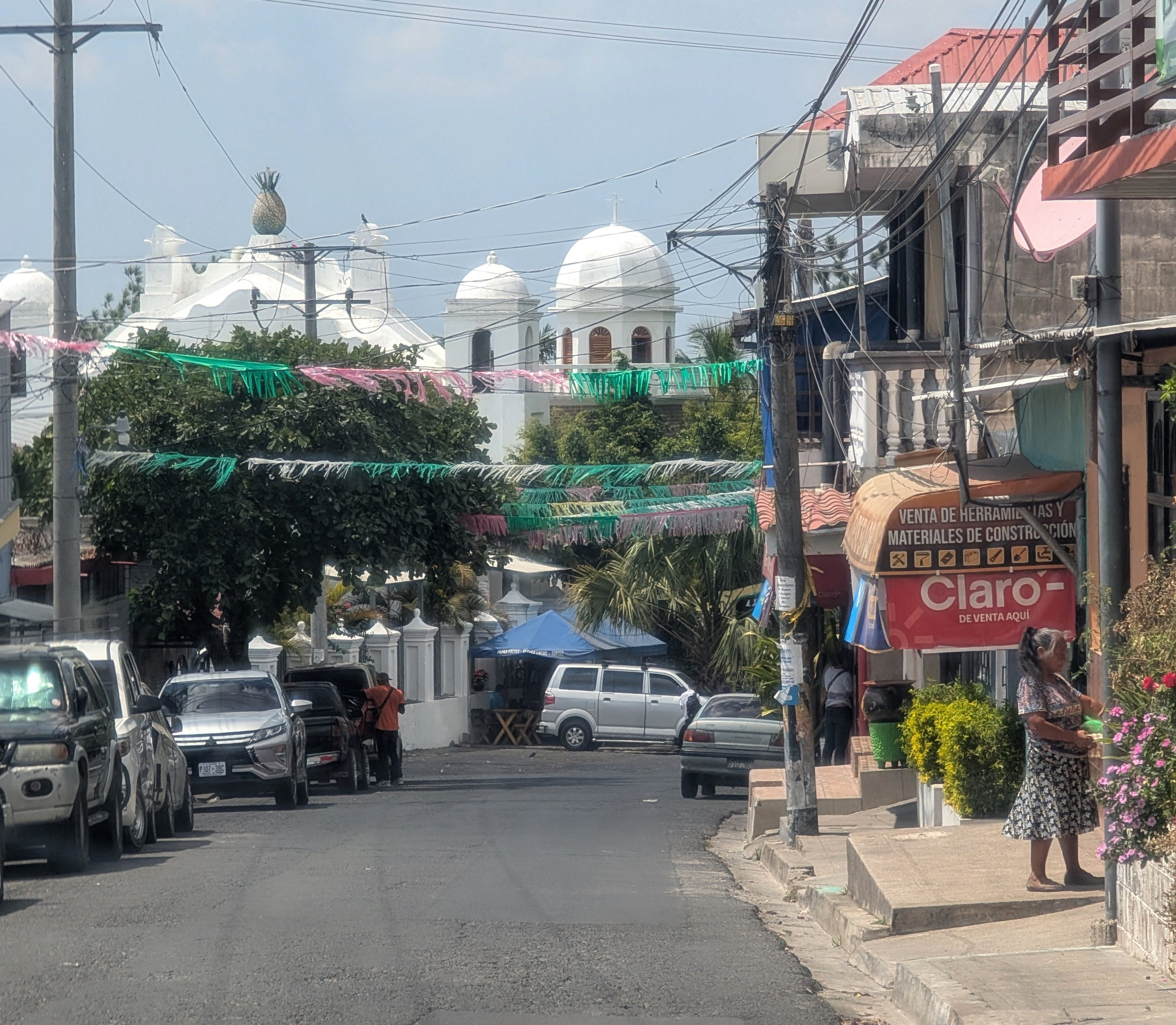
- Santa María Ostuma in 2026

- Location in El Salvador
- Coordinates: 13°37′N 88°56′W
- Country: El Salvador
- Department: La Paz
- Elevation: 1,900 ft (580 m)

Santa María Ostuma is a municipality in the La Paz department of El Salvador.
