= Mercedes La Ceiba =

- District
- Location in El Salvador
- Coordinates: 13°38′N 88°54′W
- Country: El Salvador
- Department: La Paz
- Elevation: 2,208 ft (673 m)

Population (2024)
  - District: 632
  - Rank: 261st in El Salvador
  - Rural: 632

Mercedes La Ceiba is a municipality in the La Paz department of El Salvador.
