= San Bartolomé Perulapía =

- District
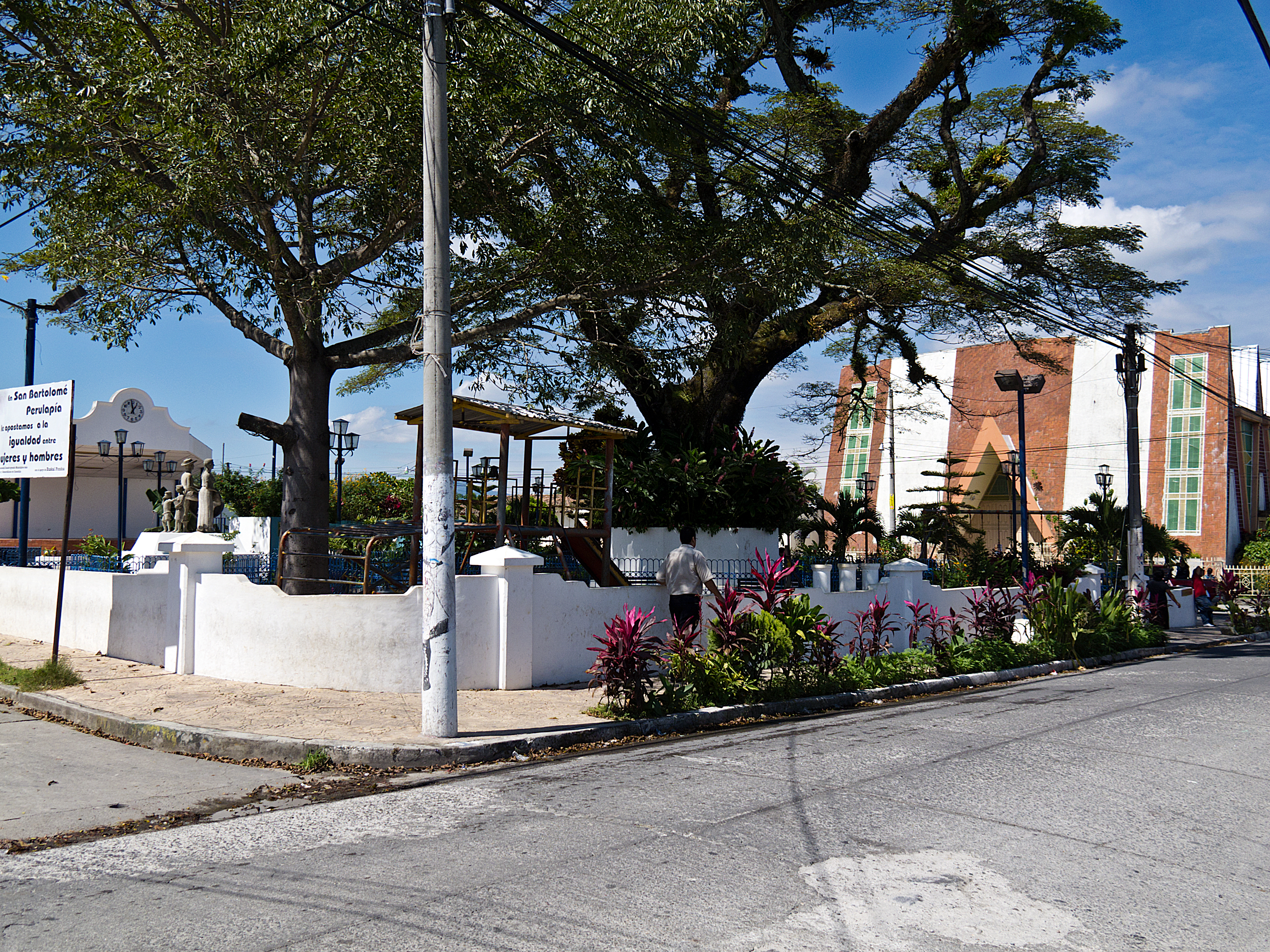

- Location in El Salvador
- Coordinates: 13°45′57″N 89°3′3″W
- Country: El Salvador
- Department: Cuscatlán
- Municipality: Cuscatlán Norte
- Elevation: 2,139 ft (652 m)

Population (2024)
  - District: 7,681
  - Rank: 152nd in El Salvador
  - Urban: 6,507
  - Rural: 1,174

San Bartolomé Perulapía is a district in the Cuscatlán Department of El Salvador. It is located on the highway between San Martín and Suchitoto.

The following statistics are for a city of the same name within the municipality:

== Municipality statistics ==
- Population: 12,000 (according to mayorship) or 6909 (according to SIBASI 2001)
- One Hospital
- Two Schools
- Ten Churches
- Water, electricity, phone services
- Two Alcoholics Anonymous groups
- A police force
- A court

== History ==
When the Spanish conquistadors came, the location was part of three native towns called pupulapan. The towns were then called, by the Europeans, San Martín, San Pedro, y San Bartolomé Perulapán, also called pupulapía, y transformed into perulapía. In 1770 Pedro Cortés y Larraz estimated that the population was 421 natives and 6 Latinos in population.

It was part of the department of San Salvador from 1824 until 1835, at which time it was turned over to Cuscatlán. Because of an earthquake in 1872, the town was moved a kilometer from its original location. Its population was 960 inhabitants in 1890.
