= San José, El Salvador =

San José
- District
- Location in El Salvador
- Coordinates: 13°25′N 87°59′W
- Country: El Salvador
- Department: La Unión Department
- Elevation: 750 ft (230 m)

Population (2024)
  - District: 2,544
  - Rank: 241st in El Salvador
  - Rural: 2,544

San José is a municipality in the La Unión department of El Salvador.

San José, also known as San José La Fuente, is a municipality of the department of La Unión in El Salvador

The Cantones("Neighborhoods" or "boroughs") within the municipality consist of the following: La Chacara, El Valle Nuevo, El Sapote, El Chagüite, La Joya, Las Pilas, La Bolsa, and El Sombrero.
