= San Matías, El Salvador =

San Matías
- District
- Location in El Salvador
- Coordinates: 13°53′N 89°19′W
- Country: El Salvador
- Department: La Libertad
- Elevation: 1,600 ft (500 m)

Population (2024)
  - District: 7,074
  - Estimate (2026): 9,042
  - Rank: 168th in El Salvador
  - Urban: 6
  - Rural: 7,068

San Matías is a municipality in La Libertad department of El Salvador.

A small town where in around February held festive celebrations to show their love for the village and San Matías. There are rodeos and coronations of the queen of the town (reina del pueblo). There are also: a fair, games, horse races, cockfights and fireworks.
