= Bolívar, El Salvador =

Bolívar
- District
- Location in El Salvador
- Coordinates: 13°35′N 87°57′W
- El Salvador: El Salvador
- Department: La Unión

Area
  - District: 51.59 km^{2} (19.92 sq mi)
- Elevation: 242 m (794 ft)

Population (2024)
  - District: 3,482
  - Rank: 224th in El Salvador
  - Rural: 3,482
- Time zone: UTC-6 (Central)

Bolívar is a municipality (municipio) in La Unión Department of El Salvador.
