= Carolina, El Salvador =

Carolina
- Municipality
- Location in El Salvador
- Coordinates: 13°51′N 88°18′W
- Country: El Salvador
- Department: San Miguel Department
- Elevation: 1,410 ft (430 m)

Population (2024)
  - Total: 6,419

Carolina is a municipality in the San Miguel department of El Salvador.
