= El Rosario, La Paz =

El Rosario
- District
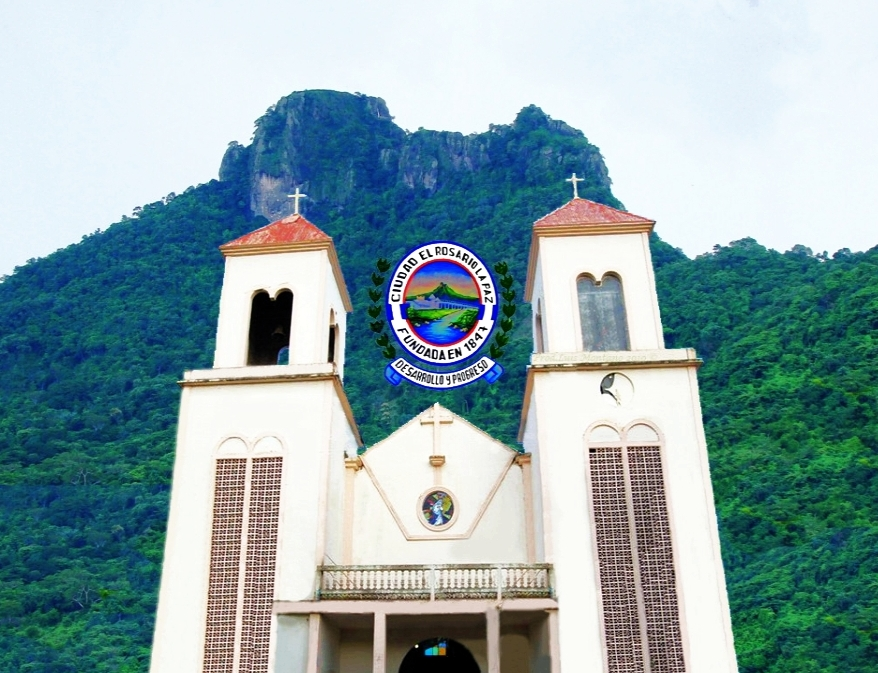

- Location in El Salvador
- Coordinates: 13°30′N 89°2′W
- Country: El Salvador
- Department: La Paz

Area
  - Land: 7.4 sq mi (19.2 km^{2})

Population (2024)
  - District: 17,551
  - Estimate (2026): 20,724
  - Rank: 82nd in El Salvador
  - Urban: 14,055
  - Rural: 3,496

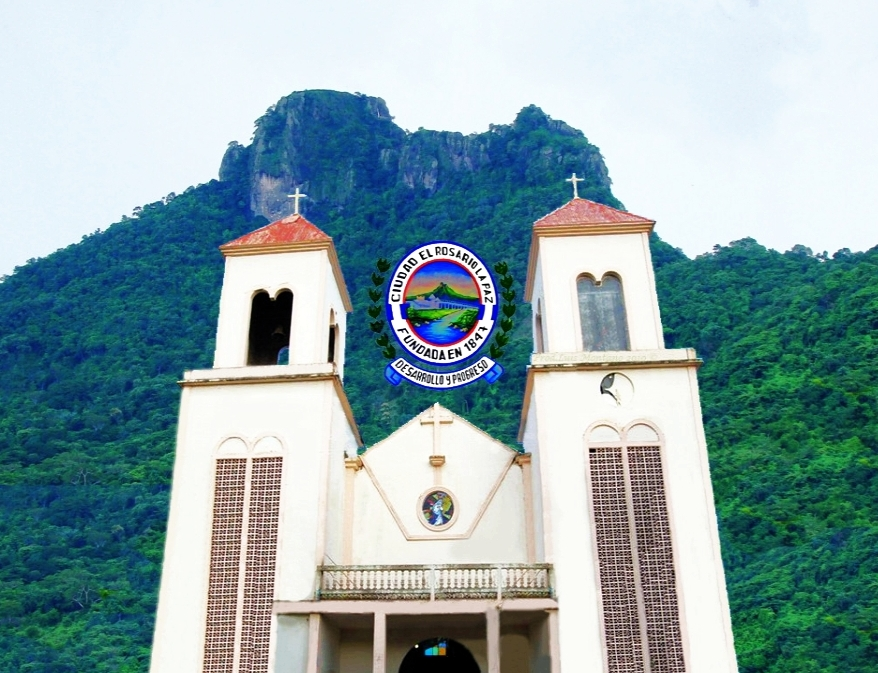

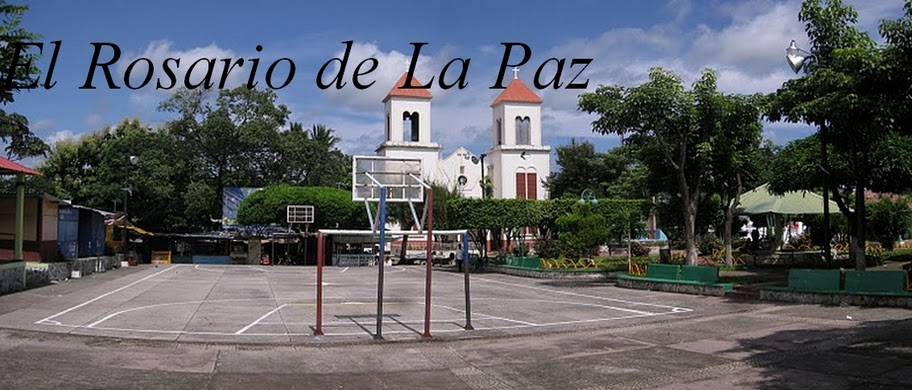

El Rosario is a municipality in the La Paz department of El Salvador.

== Early history ==
The history of El Rosario begins when it was a plantation called "Hacienda El Rosario", which belonged to Doña Margarita Carballo, and originated from Zacatecoluca. The inhabited village was composed of Ladinos, mulattos, and peasants with a predominantly rural agricultural environment. This plantation was visited as early as 1770 by Monsignor Pedro Larras Cortez, a Spanish Archbishop based in Guatemala, when he came on pastoral visits to the country.

El Rosario belonged to the department of San Salvador until February 21, 1852, when the Department of La Paz was established and Zacatecoluca was named as the departmental headquarters whose administrative area was now to include the town of El Rosario while still a part of the Olocuilta district.

== Title of town ==
By Legislative Decree No 486, dated November 18, 1998, El Rosario obtained the title of city, under the administration of Julio Arevalo Diego Bonilla. The administration of former President Dr. Armando Calderon Sol bestowed the title of City in a solemn public ceremony in the town's Central Park on December 19, 1998.

== Politics ==
Historically El Rosario has had a Conservative right-leaning municipal government in charge, the first being P.C.N. "Partido de Conciliación Nacional" (The Party of National Conciliation) and currently A.R.E.N.A "Alianza Republicana Nacionalista" (The Nationalist Republican Alliance). Julio Arevalo Diego Bonilla of P.C.N. is credited with modernizing the city of El Rosario by implementing the construction of concrete streets and a municipal soccer stadium.
