= Perquín =

- District
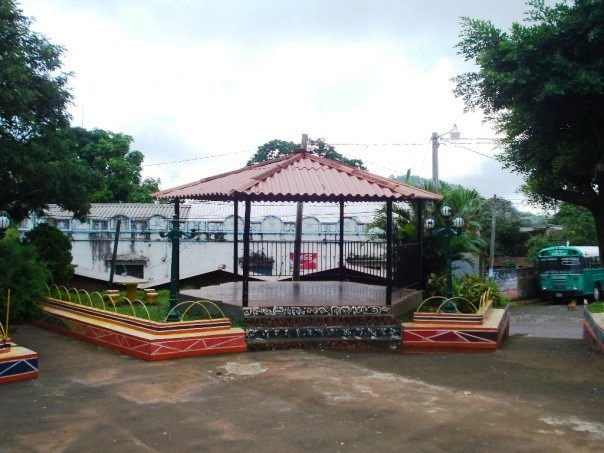

- Location in El Salvador
- Coordinates: 13°57′N 88°10′W
- Country: El Salvador
- Department: Morazán Department

Government
  - Mayor: Imelda Maribel Sorto (ARENA)

Area
  - District: 42 sq mi (109 km^{2})
- Elevation: 3,665 ft (1,117 m)

Population (2024)
  - District: 2,564
  - Rank: 240th in El Salvador
  - Rural: 2,564

Perquín is a municipality in the Morazán department of El Salvador.

It is home to the Museum of the Revolution, which contains artifacts and exhibits related to the Salvadoran Civil War. Exhibits include a recreation of Radio Venceremos, a civil war-era opposition radio station that was broadcast throughout the country and re-broadcast via short wave radio throughout the world during the 1980s. Today Radio Venceremos is a commercial radio station called la RV.

Perquin is surrounded by coffee plantations and green pinegroves and hosts an annual festival that takes place during the first week of August.

== Climate ==
Climate data for Perquín (1991–2020)
Month	Jan	Feb	Mar	Apr	May	Jun	Jul	Aug	Sep	Oct	Nov	Dec	Year
Mean daily maximum °C (°F)	26.6 (79.9)	27.9 (82.2)	28.9 (84.0)	28.9 (84.0)	27.1 (80.8)	26.3 (79.3)	26.9 (80.4)	26.7 (80.1)	25.8 (78.4)	25.4 (77.7)	25.8 (78.4)	26.2 (79.2)	26.9 (80.4)
Daily mean °C (°F)	20.1 (68.2)	20.8 (69.4)	21.6 (70.9)	22.3 (72.1)	21.7 (71.1)	21.2 (70.2)	21.6 (70.9)	21.2 (70.2)	20.5 (68.9)	20.3 (68.5)	20.2 (68.4)	20.1 (68.2)	21.0 (69.8)
Mean daily minimum °C (°F)	15.9 (60.6)	16.2 (61.2)	16.9 (62.4)	18.0 (64.4)	18.1 (64.6)	18.0 (64.4)	17.9 (64.2)	17.8 (64.0)	17.6 (63.7)	17.5 (63.5)	16.8 (62.2)	16.3 (61.3)	17.3 (63.1)
Average precipitation mm (inches)	5.2 (0.20)	6.0 (0.24)	27.0 (1.06)	89.1 (3.51)	365.7 (14.40)	442.4 (17.42)	310.5 (12.22)	404.1 (15.91)	559.3 (22.02)	437.6 (17.23)	99.6 (3.92)	11.8 (0.46)	2,758.1 (108.59)
Average relative humidity (%)	67	65	65	71	81	85	77	82	89	87	77	71	76.3
Source: Ministerio de Medio Ambiente y Recursos Naturales

== See also ==
- Prodetur – ecotourism organization active in Perquin
