= El Porvenir, El Salvador =

El Porvenir
- Municipality
- Location in El Salvador
- Coordinates: 14°01′N 89°38′W
- Country: El Salvador
- Department: Santa Ana

Government
  - Mayor: Jorge Sigfredo Ramos Macal

Area
  - Municipality: 20.28 sq mi (52.52 km^{2})
- Elevation: 2,300 ft (700 m)

Population
  - Municipality: 8,232

El Porvenir is a city and municipality in the Santa Ana department of El Salvador.
