= Oratorio de Concepción =

- District
- Interactive map of Oratorio de Concepción
- Location in El Salvador
- Coordinates: 13°49′N 89°4′W
- Country: El Salvador
- Department: Cuscatlán
- Municipality: Cuscatlán Norte
- Elevation: 1,940 ft (590 m)

Population (2024)
  - District: 3,748
  - Rank: 220th in El Salvador
  - Urban: 2,192
  - Rural: 1,556

Oratorio de Concepción is a district in the Cuscatlán Department of El Salvador.
