= San Isidro, Morazán =

San Isidro
- District
- Location in El Salvador
- Coordinates: 13°51′N 88°14′W
- Country: El Salvador
- Department: Morazán Department
- Elevation: 1,729 ft (527 m)

Population
  - District: 2,811
  - Rank: 233rd in El Salvador
  - Urban: 1,141
  - Rural: 1,670

San Isidro is a municipality in the Morazán department of El Salvador.
