= Yamabal =

- District
- Location in El Salvador
- Coordinates: 13°40′N 88°10′W
- Country: El Salvador
- Department: Morazán Department
- Elevation: 843 ft (257 m)

Population (2024)
  - District: 3,010
  - Rank: 232nd in El Salvador
  - Rural: 3,010

Yamabal is a municipality in the Morazán department of El Salvador.
