= San Juan Talpa =

- Municipality
- Location in El Salvador
- Coordinates: 13°30′N 89°5′W
- Country: El Salvador
- Department: La Paz
- Elevation: 430 ft (130 m)

San Juan Talpa is a municipality in the La Paz department of El Salvador.
