= San Antonio del Monte =

Coordinates: 13°43′N 89°44′W

San Antonio Del Monte
- Municipality
- Interactive map of San Antonio Del Monte
- Country: El Salvador
- Department: Sonsonate Department
- Established: 1901

Area
  - Municipality: 25.11 km^{2} (9.70 sq mi)
- Elevation: 282.84 m (928.0 ft)

Population (2020)
  - Municipality: 41,439
  - Density: 1,650/km^{2} (4,274/sq mi)
  - Urban: 30,790
- Time zone: UTC-6

San Antonio del Monte is also a subdivision of Garafía in the island of La Palma in the Canary Islands

San Antonio del Monte (Spanish for "Saint Anthony of the mountain") is a municipality in the Sonsonate department of El Salvador. The town was founded at the beginning of the 18th century by the friars of the convent of Santo Domingo of Sonsonate. It is at an altitude of 230 meters, a kilometer west of the city of Sonsonat.
