= San Emigdio =

- District
- Location in El Salvador
- Coordinates: 13°39′N 88°59′W
- Country: El Salvador
- Department: La Paz
- Elevation: 2,293 ft (699 m)

Population (2024)
  - District: 2,779
  - Rank: 234th in El Salvador
  - Rural: 2,779

San Emigdio (Spanish pronunciation: [san eˈmiɣðjo]) is a municipality in the La Paz department of El Salvador.
