= Cuyultitán =

- Municipality
- Nickname: Cuyulo.
- Location in El Salvador
- Coordinates: 13°33′N 89°6′W
- Country: El Salvador
- Department: La Paz

Area
  - Total: 8.61 km^{2} (3.32 sq mi)
- Elevation: 345 m (1,132 ft)

Population (2007)
  - Total: 5,590
  - Density: 649.25/km^{2} (1,681.5/sq mi)

Cuyultitán is a municipality in the La Paz department of El Salvador.
