= Guazapa =

Municipality in San Salvador

- District
- Location in El Salvador
- Coordinates: 13°53′N 89°10′W
- Country: El Salvador
- Department: San Salvador Department
- Elevation: 1,358 ft (414 m)

Guazapa is a district in San Salvador Norte Municipality in the San Salvador Department of El Salvador.
