= Lolotiquillo =

- District
- Location in El Salvador
- Coordinates: 13°44′N 88°05′W
- Country: El Salvador
- Department: Morazán Department
- Elevation: 1,437 ft (438 m)

Population (2024)
  - District: 4,592
  - Rank: 202nd in El Salvador
  - Urban: 988
  - Rural: 3,604

Lolotiquillo is a municipality in the Morazán department of El Salvador.
