= Lolotique =

- Municipality
- Location in El Salvador
- Coordinates: 13°33′N 88°21′W
- Country: El Salvador
- Department: San Miguel Department
- Elevation: 1,670 ft (510 m)

Population (2024)
  - Total: 15,007

Lolotique is a municipality in the San Miguel department of El Salvador.
