= Uluazapa =

Uluazapa Stony Place of the Ulúas
- District
- Location in El Salvador
- Coordinates: 13°30′N 88°04′W
- Country: El Salvador
- Department: San Miguel Department

Government
  - Mayor: Juan Rivera

Area
  - Land: 14.06 sq mi (36.42 km^{2})
- Elevation: 1,099 ft (335 m)

Population (2024)
  - District: 3,339
  - Rank: 226th in El Salvador
  - Rural: 3,339
- Area code: 503

Uluazapa is a municipality in the San Miguel department of El Salvador. The town is located approximately 30 minutes from San Miguel and is known for its musical atmosphere. Many refer to it as a "cradle of musicians" for its emphasis on musical education. The name "Uluazapa" stands for "Stony place of the Ulúas" in Nauathl, which were Indian tribes that inhabited the area pre-Columbian time. The municipality is made up of surrounding cantons, hamlets, and neighborhoods. The Uluazapa Central Park is located in the middle of the town, next to the colonial "San Pedro Apostal" church and the municipal hall. Surrounding the park are local shop, restaurants, and businesses. It also has a large sport center equipped with a soccer field and basketball courts. The town has a population of 3,351 Inhabitants.
