= San Antonio Masahuat =

- District
- Location in El Salvador
- Coordinates: 13°34′N 89°2′W
- Country: El Salvador
- Department: La Paz
- Elevation: 879 ft (268 m)

Population (2024)
  - District: 3,949
  - Rank: 214th in El Salvador
  - Rural: 3,949

San Antonio Masahuat is a municipality in the La Paz department of El Salvador.
