= Comacarán =

- District
- Location in El Salvador
- Coordinates: 13°32′N 88°04′W
- Country: El Salvador
- Department: San Miguel Department

Area
  - District: 13.37 sq mi (34.62 km^{2})
- Elevation: 627 ft (191 m)

Population (2024)
  - District: 3,451
  - Rank: 225th in El Salvador
  - Rural: 3,451

Comacarán is a municipality in the San Miguel department of El Salvador.
