= San Cristóbal, El Salvador =

San Cristóbal
- District
- Location in El Salvador
- Coordinates: 14°2′N 89°5′W
- Country: El Salvador
- Department: Cuscatlán Department
- Elevation: 820 ft (250 m)

Population (2024)
  - District: 9,497
  - Rank: 141st in El Salvador
  - Urban: 6,779
  - Rural: 2,718

San Cristóbal is a municipality in the Cuscatlán department of El Salvador.
