= Santa Cruz Analquito =

- District
- Location in El Salvador
- Coordinates: 13°39′N 88°57′W
- Country: El Salvador
- Department: Cuscatlán Department
- Elevation: 1,594 ft (486 m)

Population (2024)
  - District: 2,409
  - Rank: 244th in El Salvador
  - Rural: 2,409

Santa Cruz Analquito is a municipality in the Cuscatlán department of El Salvador.
