= Caluco =

- District
- Location in El Salvador
- Coordinates: 13°43′N 89°39′W
- Country: El Salvador
- Department: Sonsonate

Government
  - Mayor: Nelson Uvaldo Cornejo Sibrian

Area
  - Municipality: 19.86 sq mi (51.43 km^{2})
- Elevation: 1,250 ft (380 m)

Population (2024)
  - Total: 10,330

Caluco is a city and municipality in the Sonsonate department of El Salvador. According to the 2007 Population and Housing Census, it has a population of 9,139.

== History ==
Caluco was a producer of cocoa.

Caluco, which in colonial times was at the peak of Salvadoran cocoa production and export, also holds a treasure of cultural heritage: the ruins of the first church in El Salvador.

== Area ==
The municipality is 51.43 km^{2} (19.86 mi^{2}) large.
