= Azacualpa, El Salvador =

Azacualpa
- District
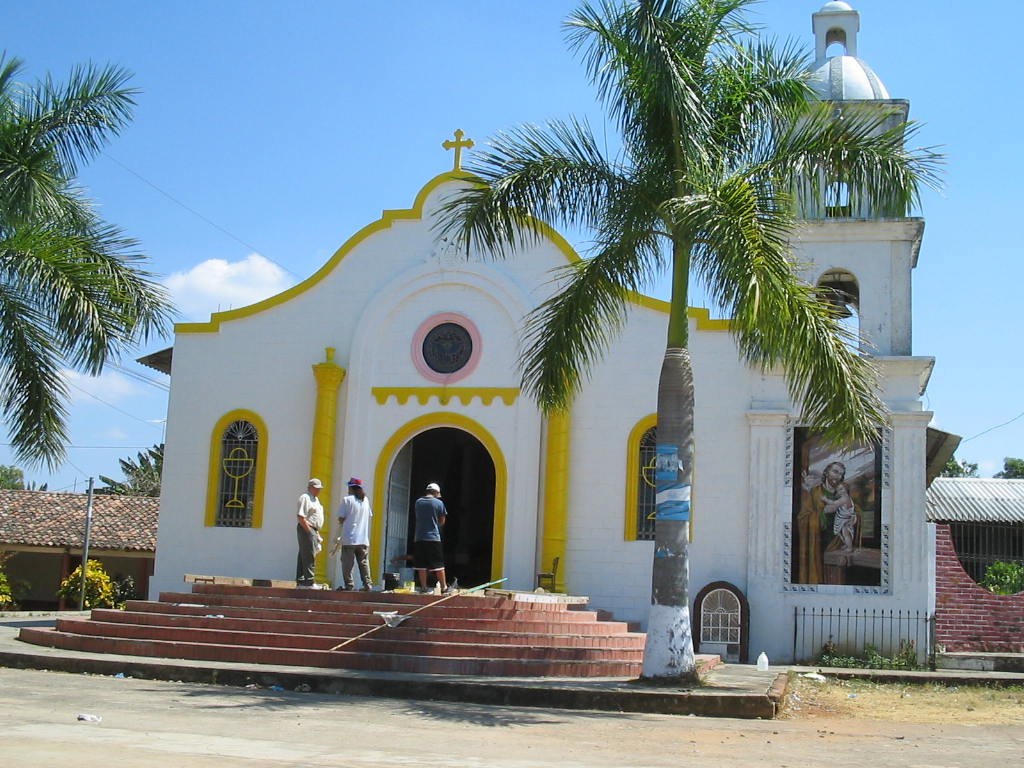

- Location in El Salvador
- Coordinates: 13°58′N 88°58′W
- Country: El Salvador
- Department: Chalatenango
- Municipality: Chalatenango Sur

Area
  - District: 3.9 sq mi (10.1 km^{2})
- Elevation: 1,854 ft (565 m)

Population (2024)
  - District: 1,053
  - Rank: 257th in El Salvador
  - Urban: 2
  - Rural: 1,051

Azacualpa is a district in the Chalatenango Department of El Salvador. At the 2024 census, it had a population of 1053.
