= San Pedro Puxtla =

- District
- Location in El Salvador
- Coordinates: 13°46′N 89°48′W
- Country: El Salvador
- Department: Ahuachapán
- Municipality: Ahuachapán Sur

Area
  - District: 15.99 sq mi (41.42 km^{2})
- Elevation: 1,654 ft (504 m)

Population (2024)
  - District: 8,749
  - Rank: 148th in El Salvador
  - Density: 547.1/sq mi (211.2/km^{2})
  - Urban: 6,136
  - Rural: 2,613

San Pedro Puxtla is a district in the Ahuachapán Department of El Salvador.
