= Tamanique =

- District
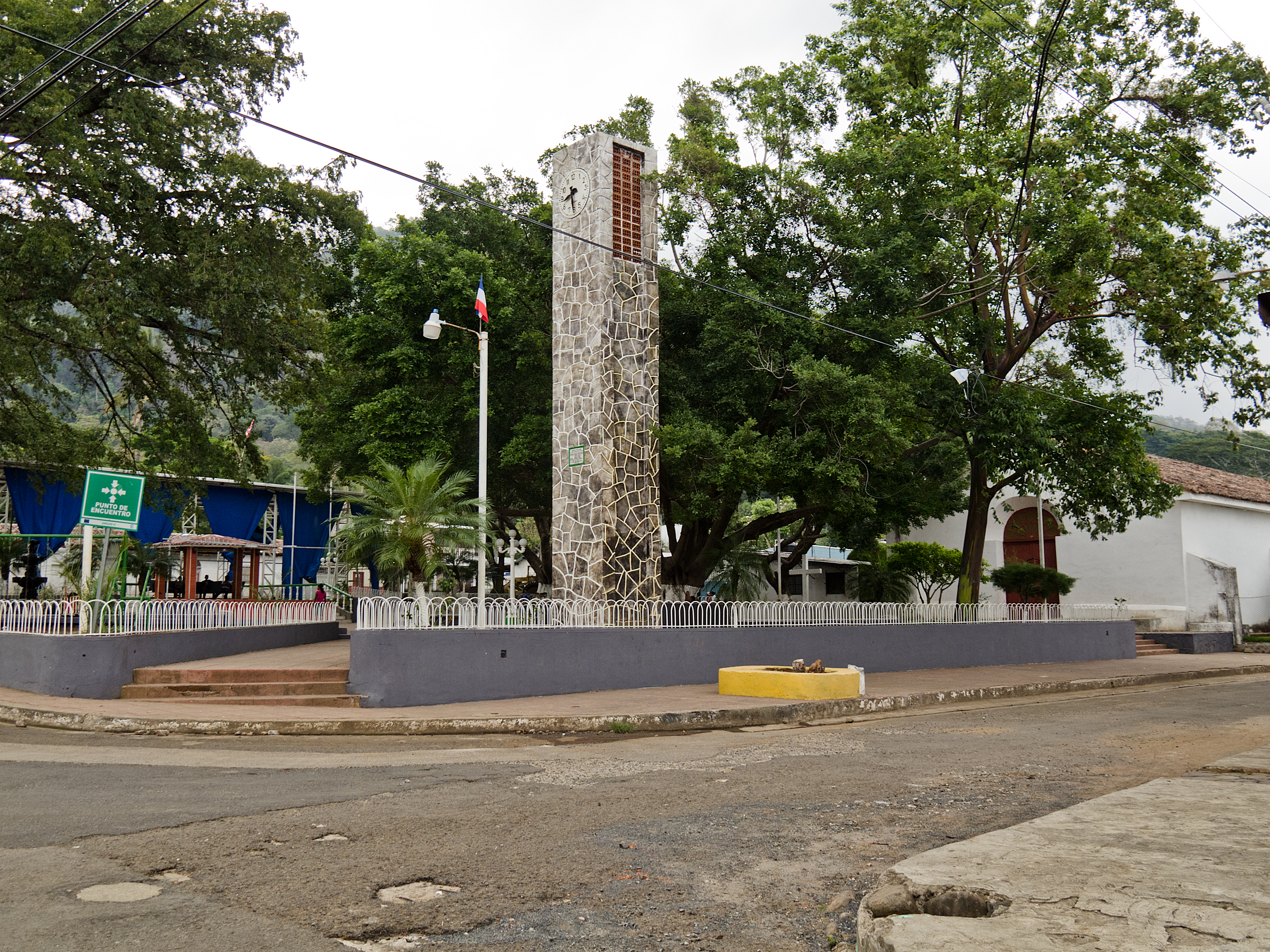

- Location in El Salvador
- Coordinates: 13°36′N 89°25′W
- Country: El Salvador
- Department: La Libertad
- Elevation: 2,083 ft (635 m)

Population (2024)
  - District: 14,068
  - Rank: 96th in El Salvador
  - Urban: 4,620
  - Rural: 9,448

Tamanique is a municipality in the La Libertad department of El Salvador, about 17 miles northwest of El Puerto La Libertad.

Tamanique is known for coffee growing and avocado trees. Its population is 5,000 (including surrounding areas).

== Gallery ==
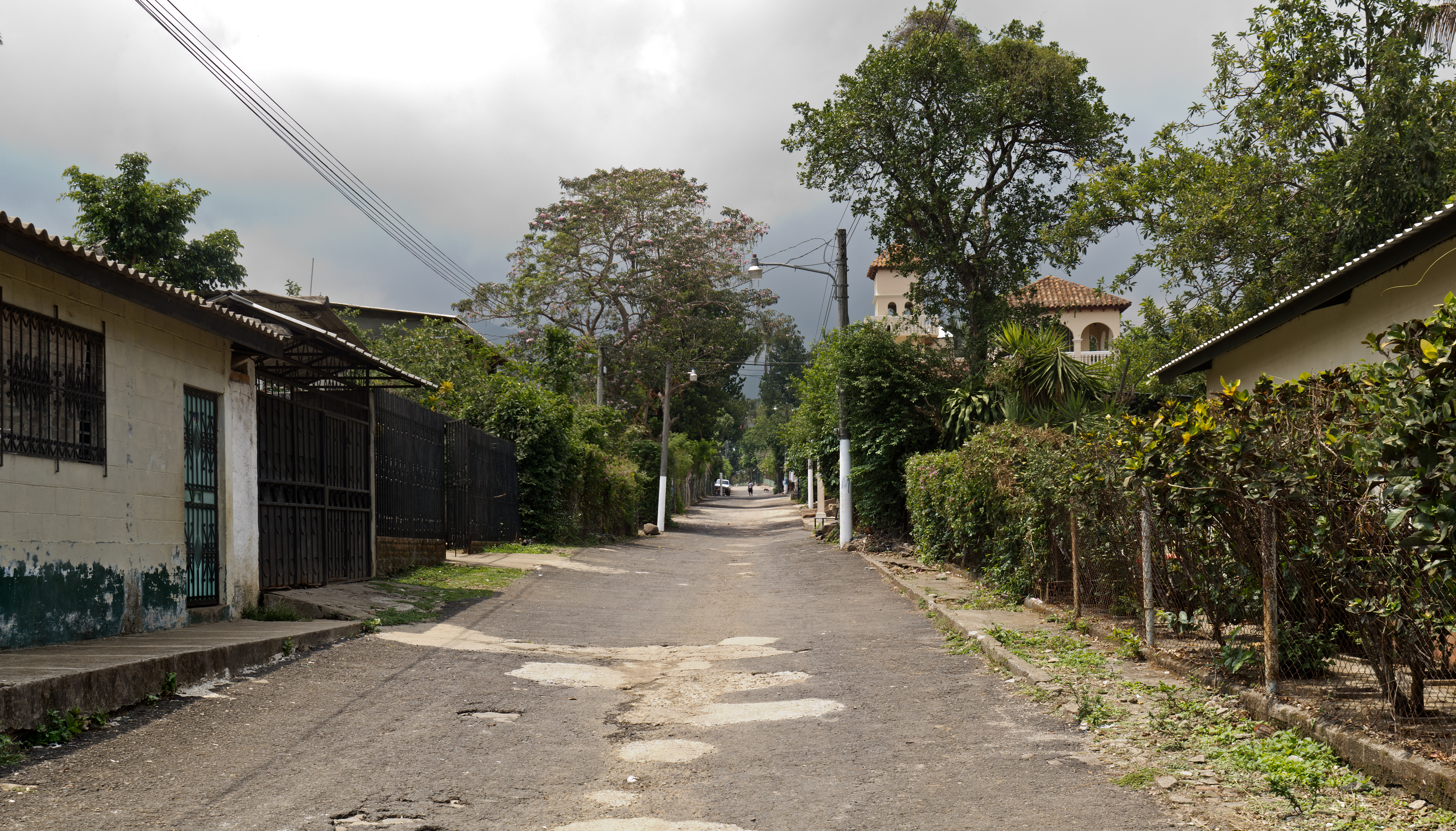
Streets of Tamanique.

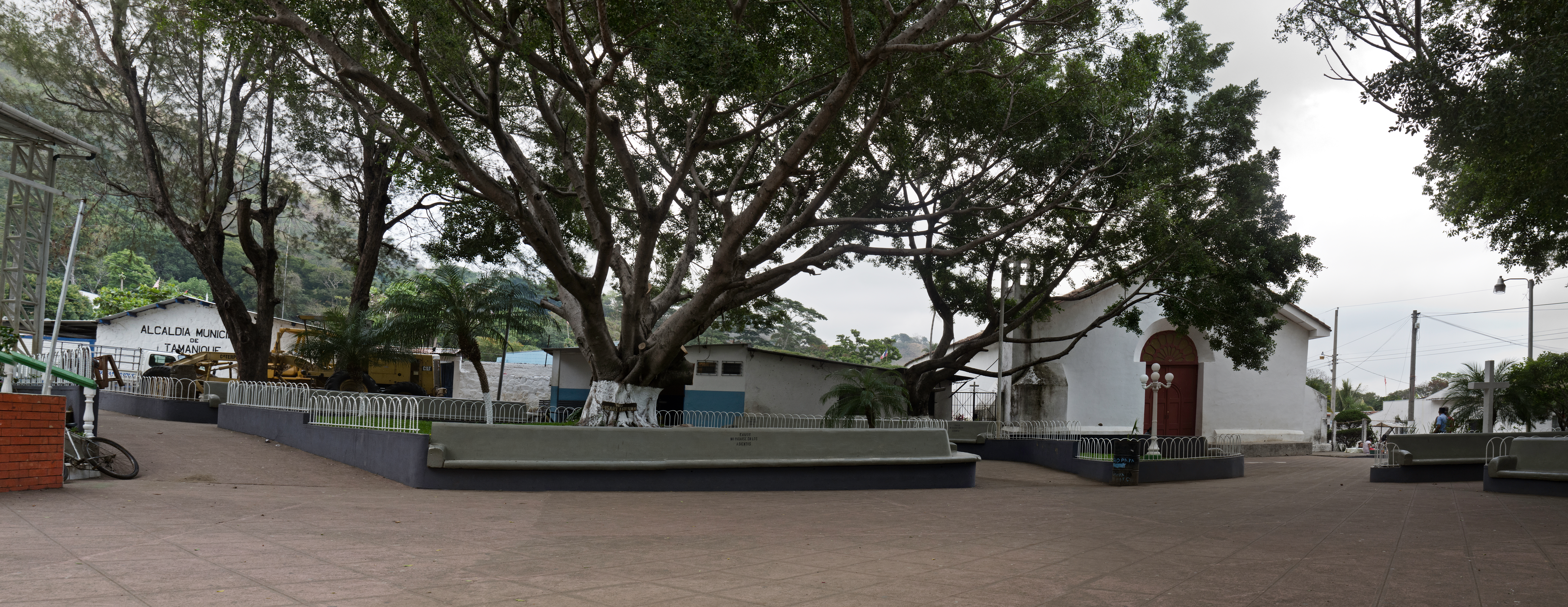
Central Park in Tamanique.

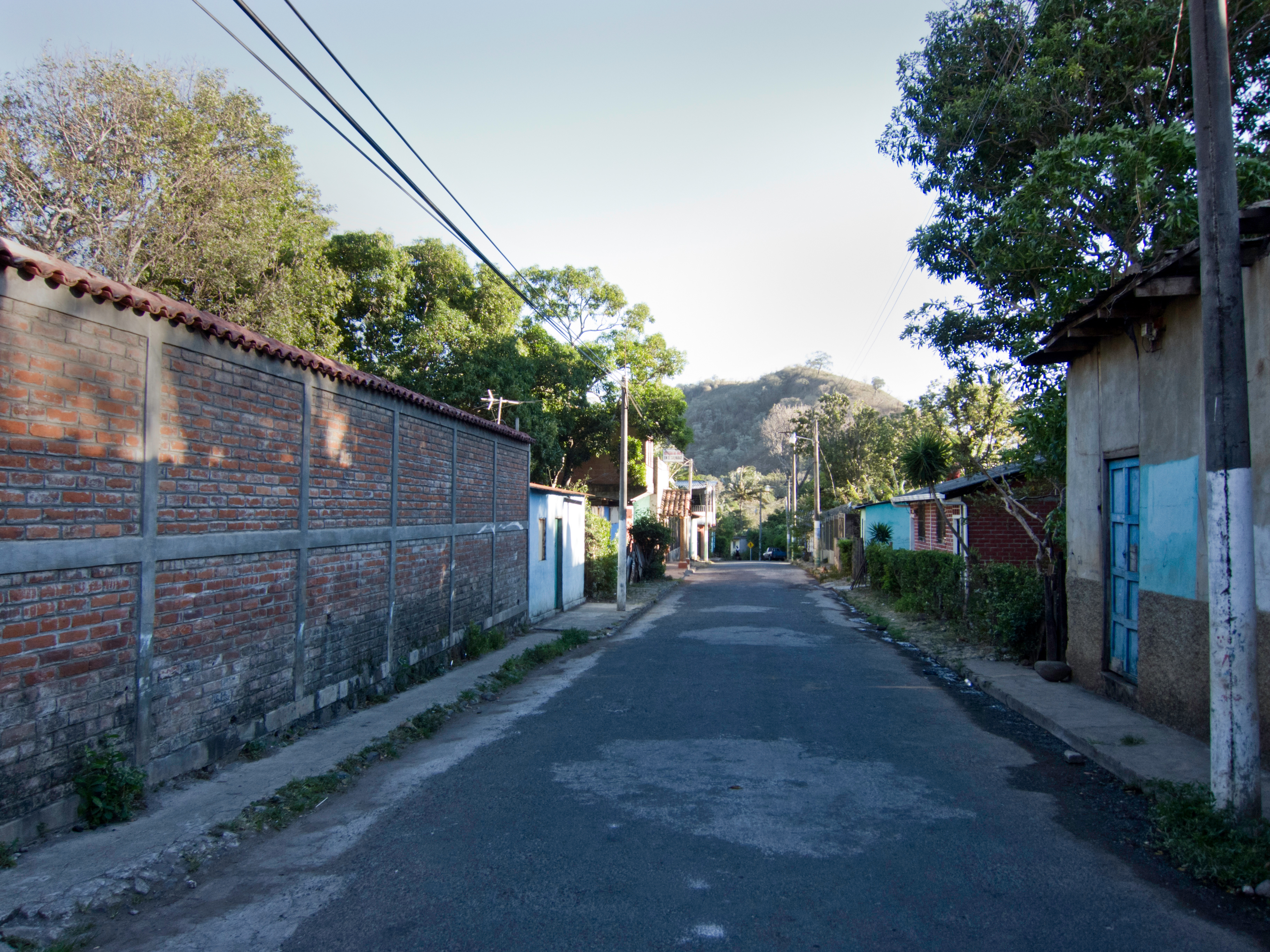
Going out of Tamanique

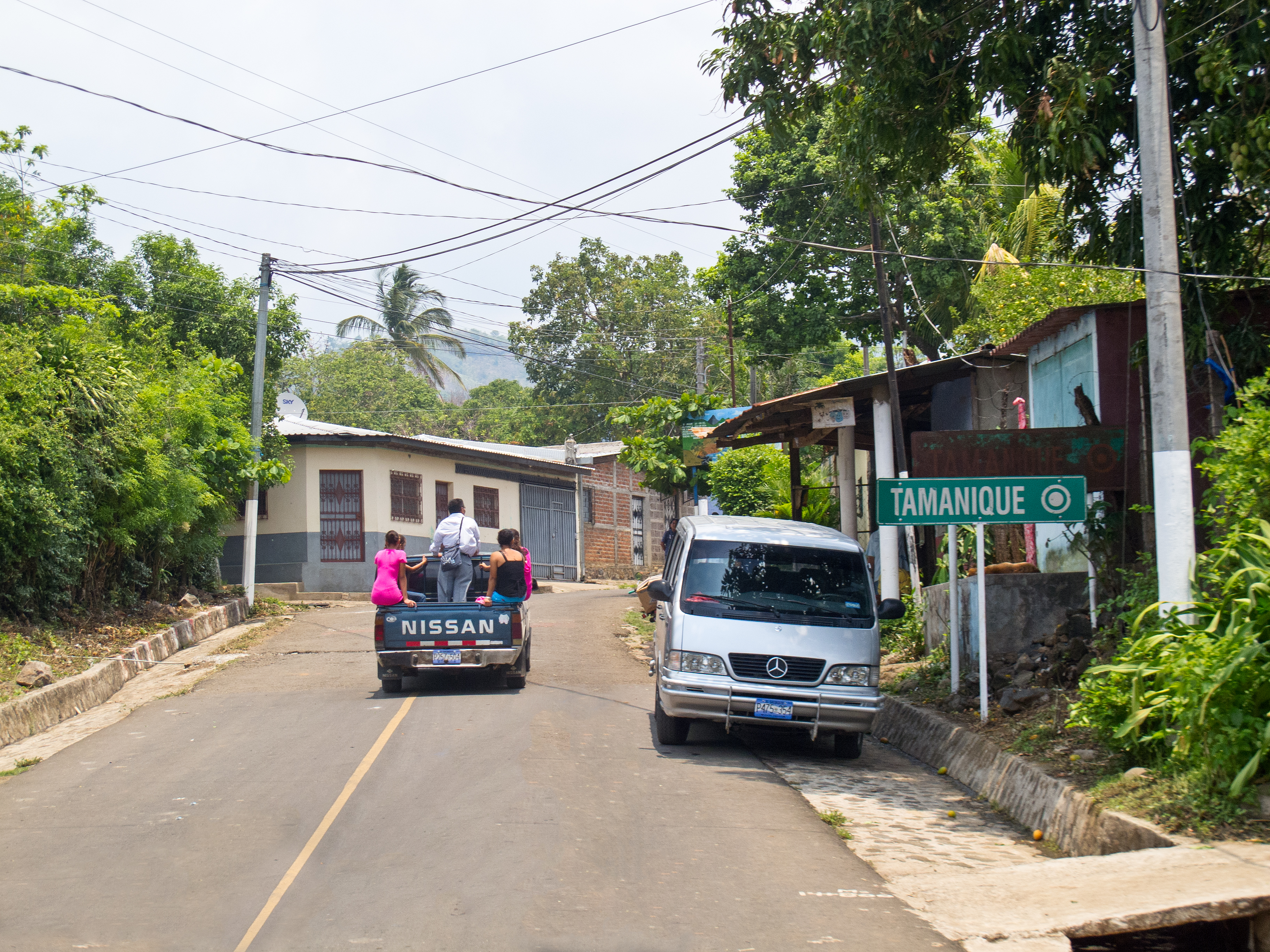
Entrance to Tamanique
