= Jocoaitique =

- District
- Location in El Salvador
- Coordinates: 13°53′N 88°8′W
- Country: El Salvador
- Department: Morazán Department
- Elevation: 1,670 ft (510 m)

Population (2024)
  - District: 4,253
  - Rank: 208th in El Salvador
  - Rural: 4,253

Jocoaitique is a municipality in the Morazán department of El Salvador.

== Sports ==
The local football club is named C.D. Atlético Juvenil and it currently plays in the Salvadoran Third Division.
