= San Francisco Chinameca =

- Municipality
- Location in El Salvador
- Coordinates: 13°36′N 89°6′W
- Country: El Salvador
- Department: La Paz
- Elevation: 2,260 ft (689 m)

San Francisco Chinameca is a municipality in the La Paz department of El Salvador.
