= San Isidro Labrador, El Salvador =

San Isidro Labrador
- District
- Location in El Salvador
- Coordinates: 14°0′N 88°51′W
- Country: El Salvador
- Department: Chalatenango
- Municipality: Chalatenango Sur
- Elevation: 1,293 ft (394 m)

Population (2024)
  - District: 586
  - Rank: 262nd in El Salvador
  - Rural: 586

San Isidro Labrador is a district in the Chalatenango Department of El Salvador.
