= Monte San Juan =

- District
- Location in El Salvador
- Coordinates: 13°46′N 88°57′W
- Country: El Salvador
- Department: Cuscatlán Department
- Elevation: 2,156 ft (657 m)

Population (2024)
  - District: 12,239
  - Rank: 116th in El Salvador
  - Urban: 10,930
  - Rural: 1,309

Monte San Juan is a municipality in the Cuscatlán department of El Salvador.
