= Tepetitán, El Salvador =

- District
- Location in El Salvador
- Coordinates: 13°39′N 88°50′W
- Country: El Salvador
- Department: San Vicente Department

Population (2024)
  - District: 3,869
  - Rank: 215th in El Salvador
  - Urban: 2,995
  - Rural: 874

Tepetitán is a municipality in the San Vicente department of El Salvador.

On February 16, 1833 indio rebel leader Anastasio Aquino was proclaimed commander-in-chief of the liberation army, and issued the Declaration of Tepetitán.
