= Paraíso de Osorio =

- District
- Location in El Salvador
- Coordinates: 13°38′N 88°58′W
- Country: El Salvador
- Department: La Paz
- Elevation: 1,610 ft (490 m)

Population (2024)
  - District: 2,607
  - Rank: 237th in El Salvador
  - Rural: 2,607

Paraíso de Osorio is a municipality in the La Paz department of El Salvador.

Paraíso de Osorio is a small village in the La Paz department and is the only village in El Salvador to play carambolas. Originally named El Paraíso (The Paradise), Paraíso de Osorio was established in the 19th century. In 1883 when it officially became a town, it became known as Paraíso de Osorio, in honor of General Rafael Osorio.
