= Tapalhuaca =

Tapalhuaca Tapalhuacan
- District
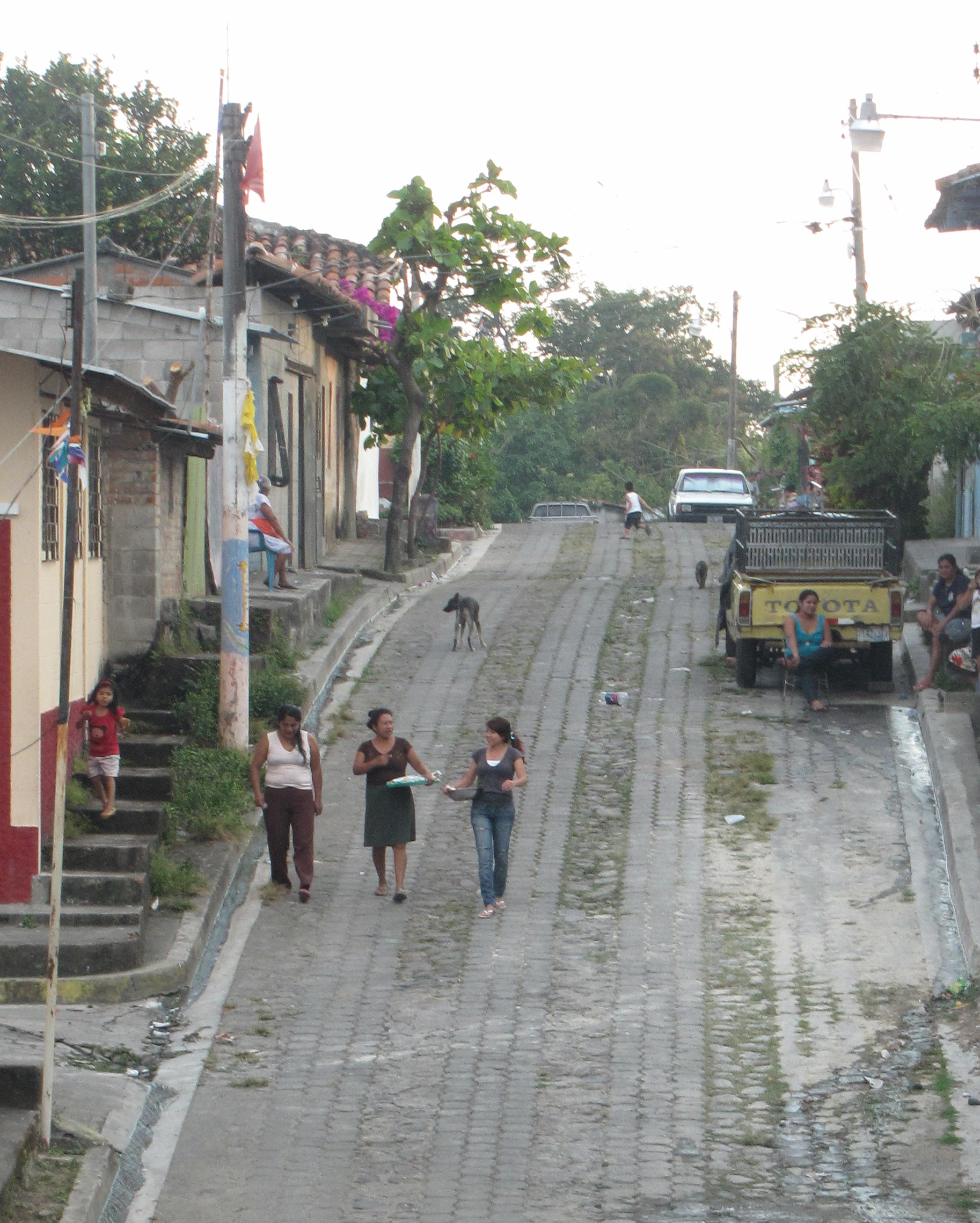
- Interactive map of Tapalhuaca
- Location in El Salvador
- Coordinates: 13°34′N 89°5′W
- Country: El Salvador
- Department: La Paz

Government
  - Alcalde (mayor of the village ): Nelson Quezada
- Elevation: 1,037 ft (316 m)

Population (2024)
  - District: 3,711
  - Rank: 221st in El Salvador
  - Urban: 1,151
  - Rural: 2,560

Tapalhuaca is a municipality in the La Paz department of El Salvador.
