= El Rosario, Cuscatlán =

El Rosario El Rosario Cuscatlan
- District
- Location in El Salvador
- Coordinates: 13°40′N 88°58′W
- Country: El Salvador
- Department: Cuscatlán Department
- Established: 1872

Government
  - Alcalde: Odilio Portillo
- Elevation: 2,021 ft (616 m)

Population (2024)
  - District: 3,639
  - Rank: 223rd in El Salvador
  - Urban: 2,129
  - Rural: 1,510

El Rosario is a municipality in the Cuscatlán department of El Salvador.
