= San Antonio de la Cruz =

- District
- Location in El Salvador
- Coordinates: 14°1′N 88°47′W
- Country: El Salvador
- Department: Chalatenango
- Municipality: Chalatenango Sur
- Elevation: 860 ft (262 m)

Population (2024)
  - District: 1,747
  - Rank: 252nd in El Salvador
  - Rural: 1,747

San Antonio de la Cruz is a district in the Chalatenango Department of El Salvador.
