= San Fernando, Morazán =

San Fernando
- District
- Location in El Salvador
- Coordinates: 13°57′45″N 88°11′51″W
- Country: El Salvador
- Department: Morazán Department
- Elevation: 3,159 ft (963 m)

Population (2024)
  - District: 1,900
  - Rank: 250th in El Salvador
  - Rural: 1,900

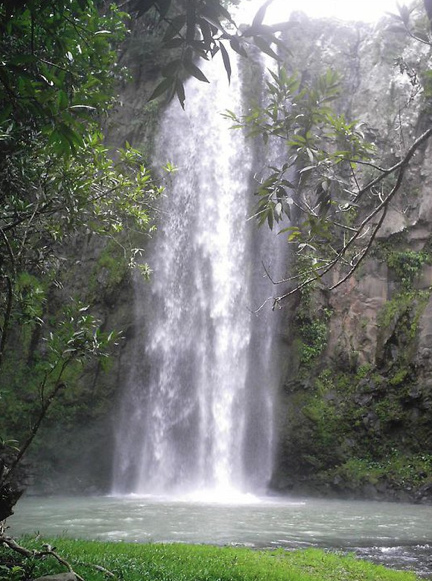
Waterfall in El Chorreron

San Fernando is a municipality in the Morazán department of El Salvador.
