= Concepción de Oriente =

- District
- Location in El Salvador
- Coordinates: 13°47′N 87°43′W
- Country: El Salvador
- Department: La Unión Department
- Elevation: 410 ft (125 m)

Population (2004)
  - Total: 7,130

Concepción de Oriente is a district in the La Unión department of El Salvador.

The district borders the Goascorán River. The river divides El Salvador and Honduras and serves as the borderline in El Salvador's eastern part of the country. The villa itself runs into the river. There is no bridge connecting the district to Honduras. The villa used to be known as "Saco". There are paved roads that lead from the nearest big city of Santa Rosa de Lima, La Unión. The "fiestas patronales" are in the first week of January.

Had the highest percent of remittances in El Salvador in 2005.
