= Gualococti =

- District
- Location in El Salvador
- Coordinates: 13°49′N 88°13′W
- Country: El Salvador
- Department: Morazán Department
- Elevation: 1,745 ft (532 m)

Population (2024)
  - District: 4,263
  - Rank: 206th in El Salvador
  - Urban: 3,043
  - Rural: 1,220

Gualococti is a municipality in the Morazán department of El Salvador.
