= Ereguayquín =

Municipality in Usulután, El Salvador

Coordinates: 13°21′N 88°23′W

Ereguayquín is a municipality in the Usulután department of El Salvador.
