= San Carlos, El Salvador =

San Carlos
- District
- Location in El Salvador
- Coordinates: 13°39′N 88°6′W
- Country: El Salvador
- Department: Morazán Department
- Elevation: 653 ft (199 m)

Population (2024)
  - District: 4,530
  - Rank: 204th in El Salvador
  - Rural: 4,530

San Carlos is a municipality in the Morazán department of El Salvador.
