= El Sauce, El Salvador =

El Sauce
- District
- Flag

- Location in El Salvador
- Coordinates: 13°40′8″N 87°48′2″W
- Country: El Salvador
- Department: La Unión Department

Government
- Elevation: 1,266 ft (386 m)

El Sauce is a district in the La Unión department of El Salvador.
