= Santiago de la Frontera =

- District
- Location in El Salvador
- Coordinates: 14°10′N 89°36′W
- Country: El Salvador
- Department: Santa Ana

Government
  - Mayor: Jorge Castro

Area
  - District: 17.07 sq mi (44.22 km^{2})
- Elevation: 1,677 ft (511 m)

Population
  - District: 5,017

Santiago de la Frontera is a district that is a part of the municipality Santa Ana Oeste in the Santa Ana department of El Salvador.

== History ==
Santiago de la Frontera began as a Spanish settlement around 1770, with it falling under the district of Metapán after 1786.

=== Post Independence ===
It was under the department of Sonsonate until 1855, when the department of Santa Ana was created. In 1848, a partition of Guatemala joined the valley of Santiago, expanding the territory of the municipality.
