= San Ramón, El Salvador =

San Ramón
- District
- Interactive map of San Ramón
- Location within El Salvador
- Coordinates: 13°40′58″N 88°55′35″W
- Country: El Salvador
- Department: Cuscatlán
- Municipality: Cuscatlán Sur

Area
  - District: 15.71 km^{2} (6.07 sq mi)
- Elevation: 600 m (2,000 ft)

Population (2024)
  - District: 6,516
  - Rank: 175th in El Salvador
  - Urban: 5,996
  - Rural: 520
- Time zone: UTC−6
- Area code: +503

San Ramón is a municipality in the Cuscatlán department of El Salvador.
