= El Divisadero, El Salvador =

El Divisadero
- District
- Location in El Salvador
- Coordinates: 13°36′N 88°3′W
- Country: El Salvador
- Department: Morazán Department

Area
  - Total: 23.69 sq mi (61.36 km^{2})
- Elevation: 899 ft (274 m)

Population
  - Total: 8,021

El Divisadero is a district in the Morazán department of El Salvador.
