= El Triunfo, El Salvador =

Municipality

Coordinates: 13°33′32″N 88°25′48″W

El Triunfo is a municipality in the Usulután department of El Salvador. It has a population of 7518 inhabitants.

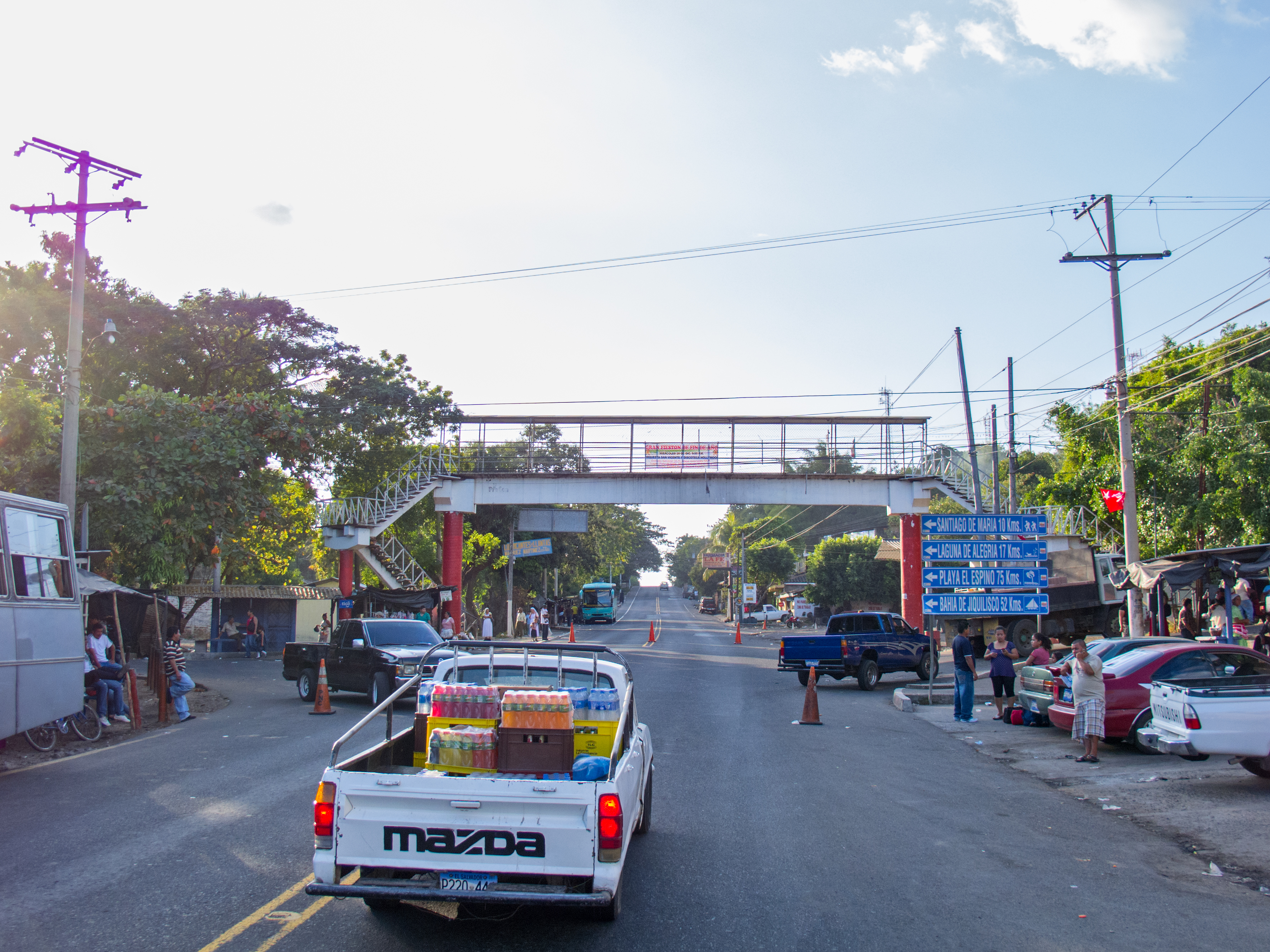
El Triunfo. This is from the Panamerican Highway
