= Polorós =

- District
- Location in El Salvador
- Coordinates: 13°35′4″N 87°50′28″W
- Country: El Salvador
- Department: La Unión Department
- Elevation: 1,325 ft (404 m)

Polorós is a district in the La Unión department of El Salvador. The 2007 census counted a population of 9,701.

== History ==
Polorós was a pre-Columbian Lenca settlement. Around 1577, it was given to the Franciscan friars of the convent of San Andres Nacaome. As a town of the parish of Gotera, according to Pedro Cortes y Larraz, it had a total of 171 inhabitants in 1770, and was known as San Gaspar Polorós. The town was part of the district of Gotera from 1786 to 1827. Since 1883, it has belonged to the district of Santa Rosa de Lima, and after having been in the department of San Miguel, in 1865 it became part of the department of La Union. The town earned the title of city by a legislative decree on February 28, 1891.

== Overview ==
The district covers an area of 126.60 km^{2} and is at an altitude of 380 meters. The name Polorós means "Place of piles of leaves", "Place of leaves" or "City is reborn." The city's saints day festivities are celebrated in the month of June in honor of John The Baptist.
