= Cacaopera =

- Municipality
- Location in El Salvador
- Coordinates: 13°46′N 88°5′W
- Country: El Salvador
- Department: Morazán Department
- Elevation: 1,998 ft (609 m)

Cacaopera is a municipality in the Morazán department of El Salvador.

According to UNESCO:

The community of Cacaopera is the sole surviving representative of an otherwise vanished ethnic group, variously referred to as Ulua, Matagalpa, or Cacaopera. Linguistic evidence suggests that this group originated in lower Central America, and at some point in time (but shortly before the conquest) established an enclave within the territory of eastern El Salvador. Some of the traits which continue to identify members of the community with this ethnic group are architecture, subsistence patterns, religious practices, myths, legends, and clothing styles. The marked traditionalism of Cacaopera can be attributed, in part, to its isolation within the very mountainous terrain of northern Morazan department. This region was severely affected by the war. Many of the inhabitants of outlying hamlets relocated to Cacaopera. Cacaopera was alternatively occupied by Army and FMLN troops, and was the scene of firefights and bombardments. These circumstances has introduced considerable changes in traditional lifeways. Several archaeological sites have been recorded within the Cacaopera municipality. Tradition identifies some of these as former locations of Ulua communities. Other sites are definitely of much greater antiquity, probably reaching far back into the Archaic Period. A number of sites consist of rock shelters with petroglyphs, pictographs, and lithic flakes and debitage.
