= Santa Isabel Ishuatán =

Coordinates: 13°37′N 89°35′W

Santa Isabel Ishuatán is a municipality in the Sonsonate department of El Salvador.

Santa Isabel Ishuatán is a district in Sonsonate Este, part of the Sonsonate Department, in El Salvador, situated near the Pacific coast. This place has an area of about 95.25 km², and the 2024 census recorded that the population was 10,313 people. Traditionally, the name of the settlement was Zapotán, and then Ishuatán. The origin of the name of the settlement is in the Nahuat language, and the word “Ishuatán” usually means "place of leaves." There is a history of the settlement from colonial times, with agriculture being one of the factors determining the economy of the area (corn, cocoa, balsam, fruit, and other crops). Presently, Santa Isabel Ishuatán is famous for its rural settlements, agriculture, culture, and closeness to the Pacific Ocean.
