= Tecapán =

Coordinates: 13°27′N 88°29′W

Tecapán is a municipality in the Usulután department of El Salvador.
