= San Simón, El Salvador =

San Simón
- District
- Location in El Salvador
- Coordinates: 13°50′N 88°14′W
- Country: El Salvador
- Department: Morazán Department
- Elevation: 1,860 ft (567 m)

San Simón is a district in the Morazán department of El Salvador.
