= San Francisco Javier =

Municipality in El Salvador

Coordinates: 13°25′N 88°34′W

San Francisco Javier is a municipality in the Usulután department of El Salvador. According to the official census of 2024, it has a population of 5,144 inhabitants.

== History ==
At the beginning of the 20th century, Dr. Francisco Antonio Lima (1882-1958) made a request to the Legislative Assembly for the erection of a town and promised to donate land to build the Church, the Council, the Prisons and the Plaza. On July 13, 1932, the request was accepted and the town was called San Francisco Javier in honor of Dr. Francisco Antonio Lima and Saint Francis Xavier
