= Salcoatitán =

Coordinates: 13°50′N 89°45′W

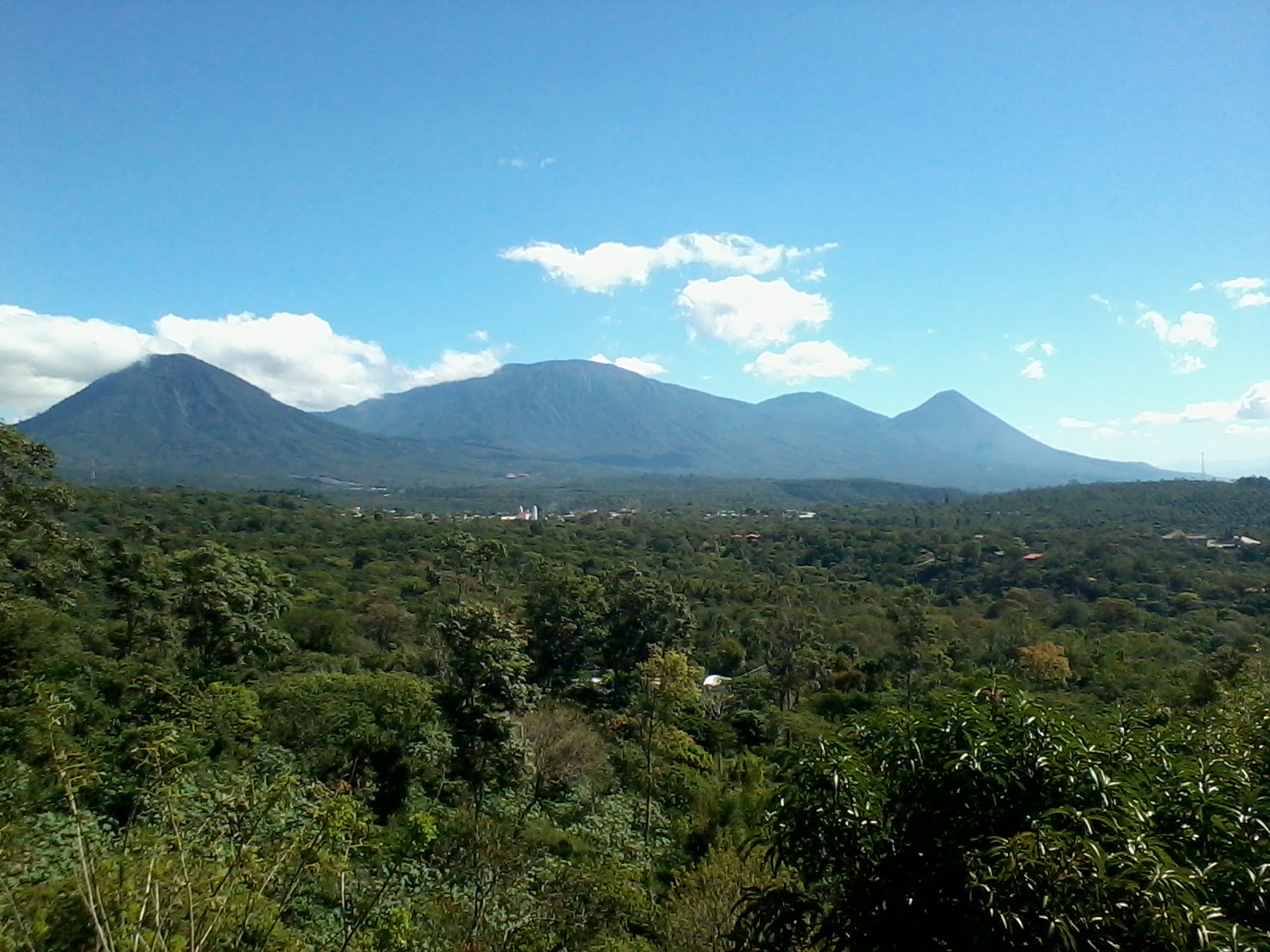
Salcoatitán.

Salcoatitán is a municipality in the Sonsonate department of El Salvador. It is located at a kilometer to the Southwest of Juayua, at 12 Kilometers to the north of Sonsonate, and at 1045 meters over the sea level. It possesses a small and beautiful colonial church that dates back to the beginning of the 19th century, made of calicanto, tile, and roof, with heavy support of bricks and stone, built by the presbyters Santiago Quijada, Esteban España, Cosme Alonso, and Juan Hidalgo. It is dedicated San Miguel Archangel, whose festivity takes place in November.
