= California, El Salvador =

Municipality in Usulután department, El Salvador

Coordinates: 13°22′N 88°40′W

California California
- District
- Interactive map of California
- Country: El Salvador
- Department: Usulután
- Municiplaity: Usulután Este

Population (2024)
  - District: 2,619
  - Rank: 236th in El Salvador
  - Urban: 35
  - Rural: 2,584

California is a municipality in the Usulután department of El Salvador.
