= Arambala =

- District
- Location in El Salvador
- Coordinates: 13°55′N 88°8′W
- Country: El Salvador
- Department: Morazán Department

Government
  - Mayor: Mariano Blanco Díaz (ARENA)
- Elevation: 2,687 ft (819 m)

Population (2024)
  - District: 3,861
  - Rank: 216th in El Salvador
  - Rural: 3,861

Arambala is a district in the Morazán Department of El Salvador. As of 2003, it had a population of 2116.
