= Rosario de Mora =

- District
- Location in El Salvador
- Coordinates: 13°35′N 89°13′W
- Country: El Salvador
- Department: San Salvador Department

Area
  - Total: 15.1 sq mi (39.2 km^{2})

Population (2007)
  - Total: 11,377

Rosario de Mora is a district in the San Salvador department of El Salvador. According to the Census of Population and Housing 2007, has 11,377 inhabitants.

== History ==
In the 1807 "The Rosary" was a farm located within the town limits of Panchimalco, years later it became Canton Township. On April, 7 1894 it was renamed as Rosario de Mora.
