= Santo Tomás, El Salvador =

Santo Tomás
- District
- Location in El Salvador
- Coordinates: 13°38′N 89°08′W
- Country: El Salvador
- Department: San Salvador Department

Area
  - Total: 9.4 sq mi (24.3 km^{2})
- Elevation: 2,293 ft (699 m)

Population (2007)
  - Total: 25,344

Santo Tomás is a district in the San Salvador department of El Salvador.

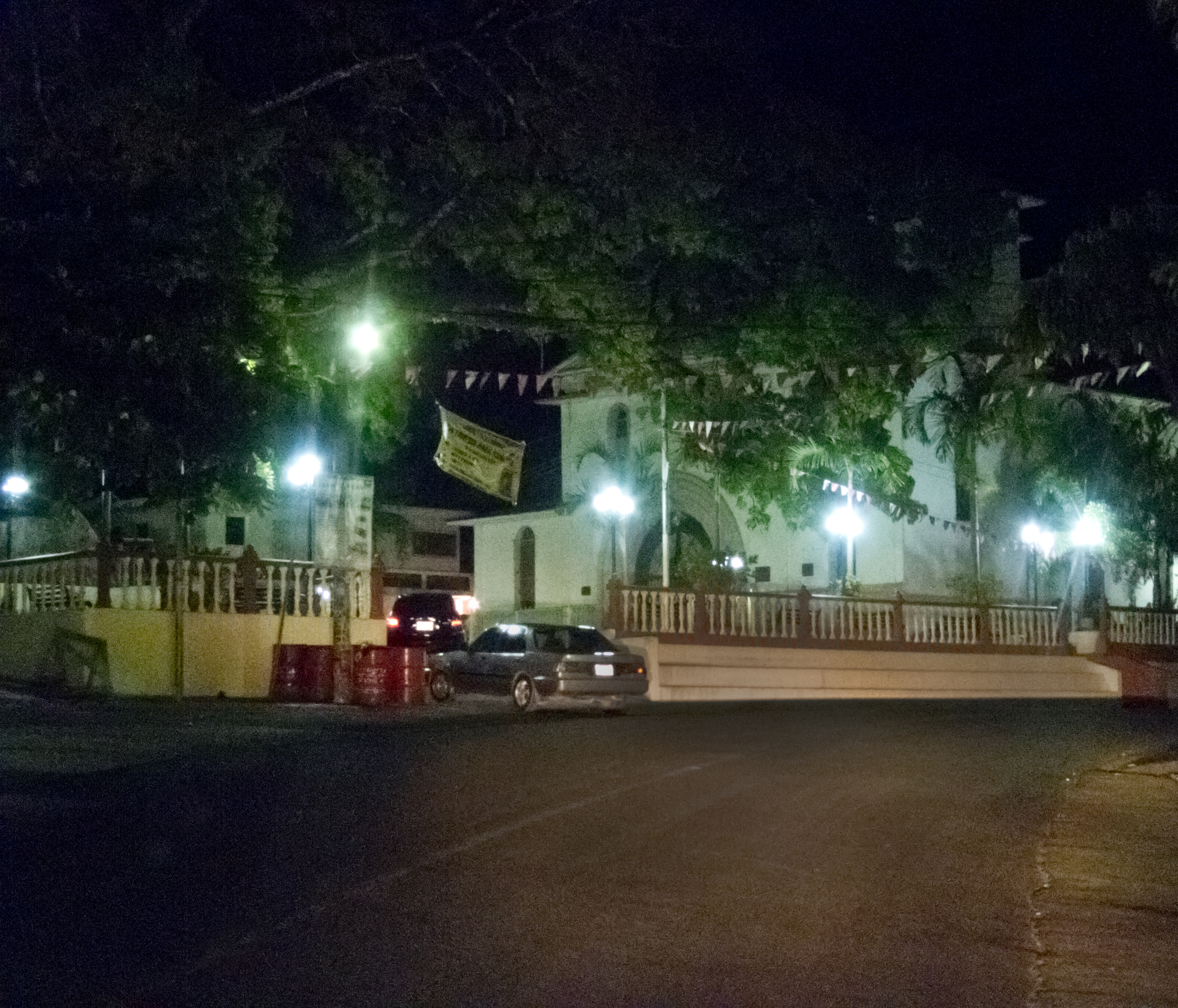
Main cathedral of Santo Tomás, across from the city hall
