= Ozatlán =

Municipality of the Usulután Department of El Salvador

Coordinates: 13°23′N 88°30′W

Ozatlán is a municipality in the Usulután department of El Salvador.

The city of Ozatlán was named in the 1970s by the governor of El Salvador. It was recently rebuilt, with a new central park and business district.
