= Santiago Texacuangos =

- District
- Santiago Texacuangos City Hall

- Location in El Salvador
- Coordinates: 13°39′N 89°07′W
- Country: El Salvador
- Department: San Salvador Department

Area
  - Total: 11.8 sq mi (30.5 km^{2})
- Elevation: 2,680 ft (817 m)

Population (2007)
  - Total: 19,428

Santiago Texacuangos is a district in the San Salvador department of El Salvador. It is near Lake Ilopango.
