= San Agustín, Usulután =

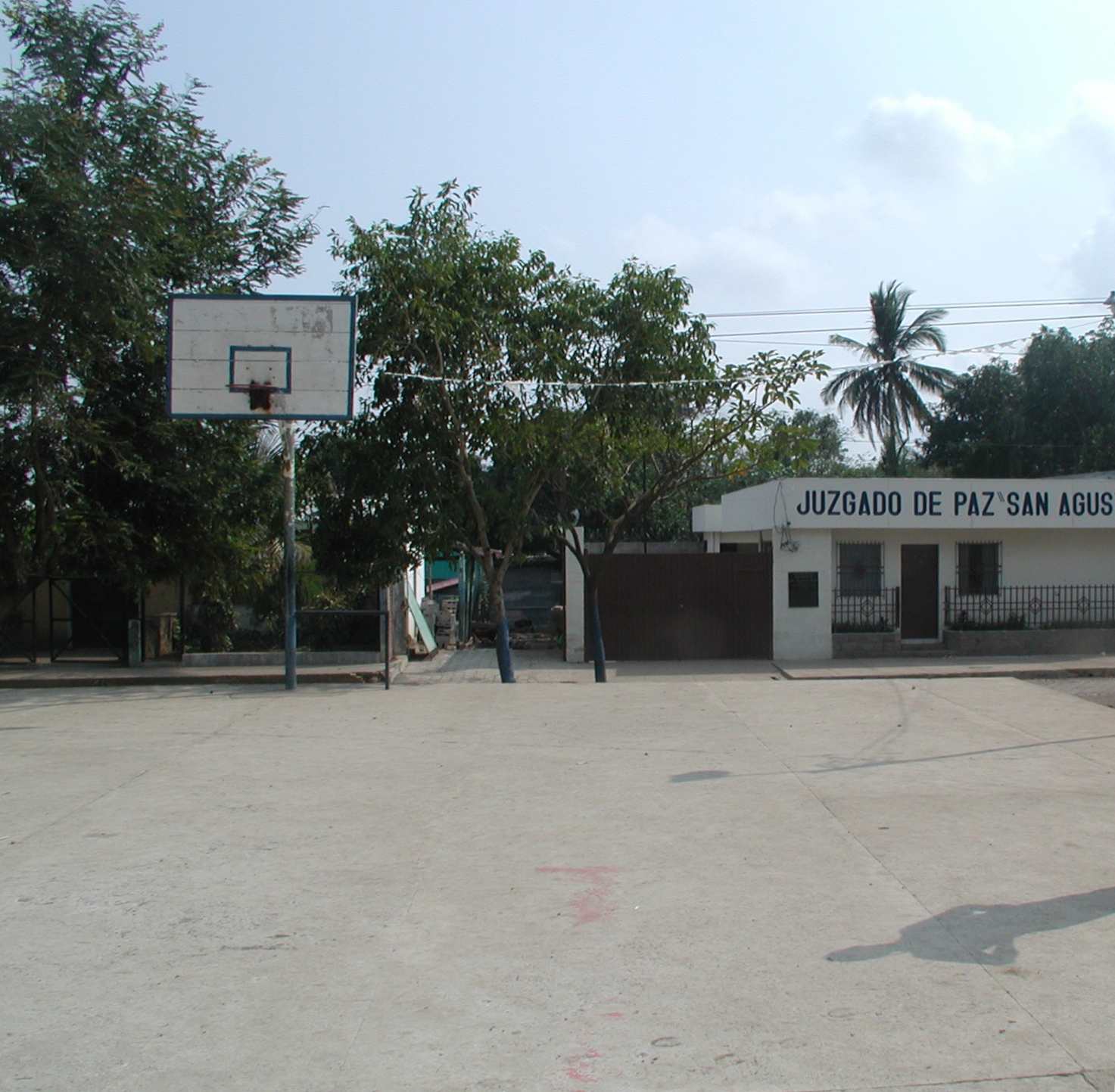
- Town Square of San Agustín

- Location within El Salvador
- Coordinates: 13°26′N 88°36′W
- Country: El Salvador
- Department: Usulután Department

San Agustín is a municipality in the Usulután department of El Salvador.
