= Morazán Department =

Department of El Salvador

Morazán
- Department
- Flag

- Location within El Salvador
- Coordinates: 13°46′30″N 88°05′53″W
- Country: El Salvador
- Created (given current status): 1875
- Seat: San Francisco Gotera

Area
  - Total: 1,447.4 km^{2} (558.8 sq mi)
  - Rank: Ranked 7th

Population (2024)
  - Total: 169,784
  - Rank: Ranked 12th
  - Density: 117.30/km^{2} (303.81/sq mi)
- Time zone: UTC−6 (CST)
- ISO 3166 code: SV-MO

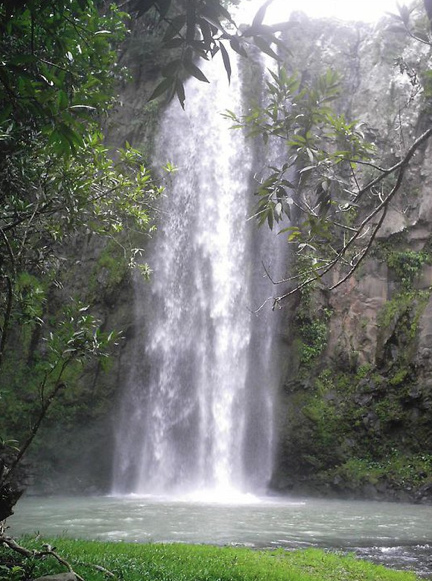
El Chorreron, San Fernando

Morazán (Spanish pronunciation: [moɾaˈsan]) is a department of El Salvador. Located in the northeast part of the country, its capital is San Francisco Gotera. It covers a total surface area of 1,447 km^{2} (559 sq mi).

== History ==
Gotera was made a department in 1875, with its capital at Osicala. On February 8, 1877, Gotera was made the capital. The department changed its name from Gotera to Morazán on March 14, 1877.

Morazán was a major stronghold of the guerrilla movement during the 1979-1992 civil war. The infamous El Mozote massacre took place in this department in the village of El Mozote on December 11, 1981, when Salvadoran armed forces killed an estimated 900 civilians in an anti-guerrilla campaign. Originally dismissed by the Salvadoran and United States governments as an invention of anti-government propaganda, the massacre was confirmed in the early 1990s through exhumation of bodies buried at the site. A museum commemorating the Salvadoran civil war, the Museum of the Revolution, was established in the municipality of Perquín.

== Agriculture ==
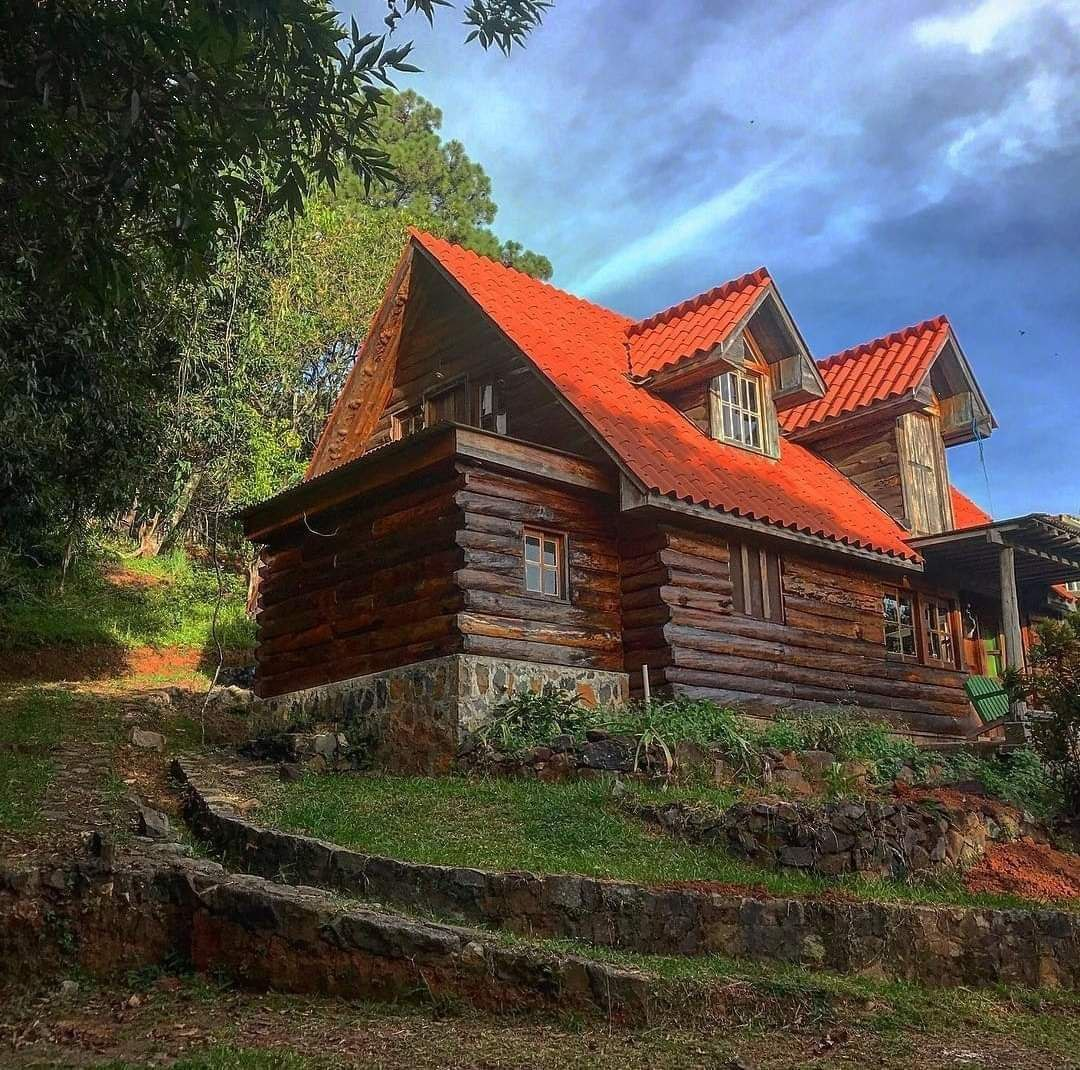
Cottage in Morazán

Among the agricultural products that stand out are the basic grains, sugar cane, henequen, grass, orchard plants, bananas, cocoa, and coffee. Livestock cultivation of cattle, horses, donkeys and sheep is also common.

== Municipalities ==
1. Morazán Norte
2. Morazán Sur

== Districts ==
1. Arambala
2. Cacaopera
3. Chilanga
4. Corinto
5. Delicias de Concepción
6. El Divisadero
7. El Rosario
8. Gualococti
9. Guatajiagua
10. Joateca
11. Jocoaitique
12. Jocoro
13. Lolotiquillo
14. Meanguera
15. Osicala
16. Perquín
17. San Carlos
18. San Fernando
19. San Francisco Gotera
20. San Isidro
21. San Simón
22. Sensembra
23. Sociedad
24. Torola
25. Yamabal
26. Yoloaiquín

== Geography ==
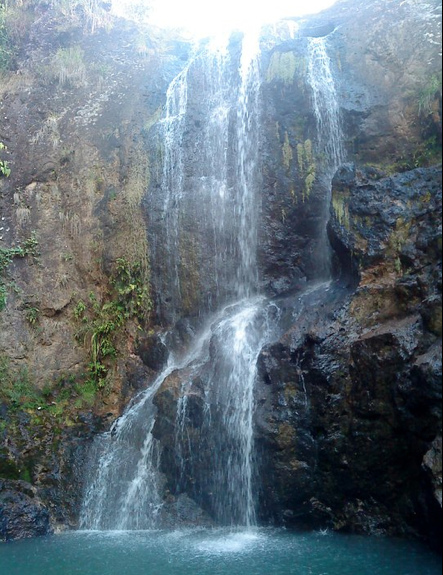
Llano del Muerto waterfall in Perquin

=== Rio Sapo ===
The Sapo River is an ecotourism destination whose turquoise-colored waters have their source in the heights of the north of Morazán. The Sapo River is reached by the highway that drives from Joateca to Arambala. 1 km. after the bridge there is a deviation with access to housing operated by Prodetur.

=== Grotto of Corinto ===
Located at 48 kilometers (30 Miles) from San Francisco Gotera, is the municipality of Corinto and a kilometer (Mile) and a half to the northeast is located the "La Gruta del Espíritu Santo" (The Holy Spirit Grotto). The grotto's walls of talpetate contain a series of petroglyphs.

=== Perquín ===
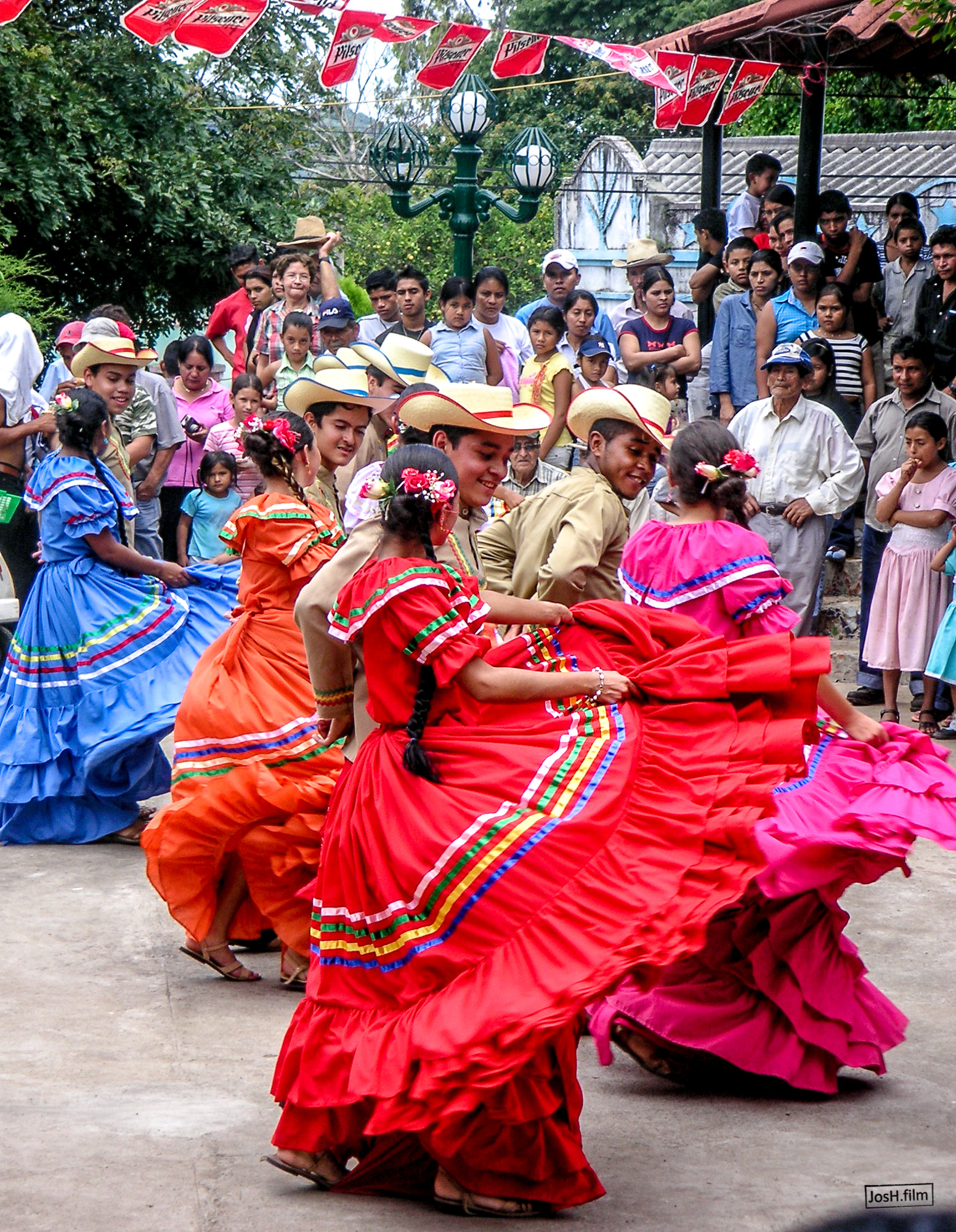
Traditional dance during the Winter Festival (celebrated beginning of every August) in Perquín, Morazán (El Salvador)

The village of Perquín was founded by Lenca tribes before European settlement. It is located at 29 kilometers to the north of San Francisco Gotera. It is the site of El Salvador's Museum of The Revolution. It is also the site of the Deadman's Plain, the Bailadero del Diablo, La Cascada del Perol, Chilanga, is located 2 kilometers (1.2 Miles) to the north of San Francisco Gotera. And is also one of the municipalities with more importance in the department. With a population of over 11,000 people it's also one of the more grown town in population. The Center of Chilanga has a public school"Dr David Turcios", a park, Catholic Church, city hall, Health Center, local court, Police precinct, Local soccer team Stadium, and many local businesses places. Chilanga's fireworks (cohetes de Don Ciro) are popular and famous in the entire region and part of the East of the country.
