= Torola =

- District
- Location in El Salvador
- Coordinates: 13°55′N 88°14′W
- Country: El Salvador
- Department: Morazán Department
- Elevation: 2,323 ft (708 m)

Population (2024)
  - District: 3,082
  - Rank: 229th in El Salvador
  - Rural: 3,082

Torola is a municipality in the Morazán department of El Salvador.
