= Santa Catarina Masahuat =

Municipality of El Salvador

Coordinates: 13°47′N 89°46′W

Santa Catarina Masahuat is a district in the Sonsonate department of El Salvador.
