= El Rosario, Morazán =

El Rosario
- District
- Location in El Salvador
- Coordinates: 13°51′57.5″N 88°12′36″W
- Country: El Salvador
- Department: Morazán Department

Area
  - District: 7.38 sq mi (19.12 km^{2})
- Elevation: 2,753 ft (839 m)

Population (2024)
  - District: 1,310
  - Rank: 255th in El Salvador
  - Rural: 1,310

El Rosario is a municipality in the Morazán department of El Salvador. The municipality has an area of 19.12 km² and a population of 1,296 according to the 2007 census.
