= Meanguera, El Salvador =

Meanguera
- District
- Location in El Salvador
- Coordinates: 13°51′N 88°09′W
- Country: El Salvador
- Department: Morazán Department
- Elevation: 1,053 ft (321 m)

Meanguera is a district in the Morazán department of El Salvador.
