= Delicias de Concepción =

- District
- Delicias de Concepción
- Interactive map of Delicias de Concepción
- Coordinates (13°47′22″N 88°08′22″W): 13°47′22″N 88°08′22″W
- Country: El Salvador
- Department: Morazán
- Municipality: Morazán Sur

Area
  - District: 20.22 km^{2} (7.81 sq mi)
- Elevation: 585 m (1,919 ft)

Population (2024)
  - District: 4,621
  - Rank: 201st in El Salvador
  - Density: 228.5/km^{2} (592/sq mi)
  - Urban: 1,887
  - Rural: 2,734
- Time zone: UTC−6 (Central Standard Time)

Delicias de Concepción is a municipality in the Morazán department of El Salvador.
