= National Liberal Party (El Salvador) =

Political party in El Salvador

National Liberal Party (Spanish: Partido Nacional Liberal) is a centrist political party in El Salvador.

On March 12, 2006 legislative election, the party won no seats.
