= Mercedes Umaña =

Coordinates: 13°34′N 88°30′W

Mercedes Umaña is a district in the Usulután department of El Salvador.
