= Guatajiagua =

- District
- Location in El Salvador
- Coordinates: 13°40′N 88°12′W
- Country: El Salvador
- Department: Morazán Department
- Elevation: 866 ft (264 m)

Guatajiagua is a district in the Morazán department of El Salvador.
