= Municipalities of El Salvador =

Administrative entity in El Salvador

municipality of El Salvador
- Municipio (Spanish)
- Category: Second-level administrative division
- Location: El Salvador
- Found in: Departments
- Government: Municipal Council

The municipalities of El Salvador (Spanish: municipios) are the second-level administrative divisions within the Republic of El Salvador. These municipalities divide the country's departments and serve as the fundamental administrative units of local government.

== History ==
=== Colony ===
San Salvador, founded in 1525 by Pedro de Alvarado, is the first municipality established in Central America. The Spanish organized the cabildos and ayuntamientos in the cities.

=== Post independence ===
In the first Constitution of the State of El Salvador, the limits of each municipality were established. On 4 September 1832, the Reglament of Political Governors, Municipalities and Mayors was emitted. This reglament established limits and jurisdictions for the Departments and regulated the municipalities and the position of Mayors. According to the reglament, the municipal councils were organized according to the following criteria:

Inhabitants	Alcalde(s)	Regidores	Síndico(s)
200 to 500	1	2	1
1000 to 2000	2	6	2
2000 to 4000	2	8	2
4000+	3	8	2

To become a member of the municipal council the requirements were: citizenship, 25 years of age, of "known morality", and being a neighbor of the territory or region of the municipality. The municipalities that were capitals of partidos (districts) had to establish Juntas de sanidad (boards of sanitation) composed of the First Alcalde, the parroquial priest, one Regidor, those trained in or practicing medicine or surgery and one neighbor named by the municipal council. The municipality was in charge of the statistics and public works of its jurisdiction.

On 9 December 1854, the government decreed various changes for the governance of municipalities. The number of members of the municipal councils was reformed in the following way: there would be 1 alcalde and 1 síndico for each population and the number of regidores would be determined according to the following criteria:

- 1 regidor in populations with no more than 3000 inhabitants.
- 3 regidores in populations with 3000 to 10,000 inhabitants.
- 5 regidores in populations with more than 10,000 inhabitants.

This decree also established the Juzgado de Paz (Justice of the Peace) which separated judicial matters from the political government of the municipalities. These were established with the following numbers:

- 1 proprietary Juez de Paz, and 1 auxiliary for populations with 1 or 3 regidores.
- 2 proprietary Jueces de Paz, and 2 auxiliaries for populations with 5 regidores.

On 12 November 1861, the government of president Gerardo Barrios decreed the Reglamento de Gobernadores, Jefes de Partido, Concejos Municipales, Alcaldes y Jueces de Paz. This bylaw had the purpose of remediating the confusions caused by the various and diverse laws emitted for the regulation of municipalities and to regulate the attributions of Jefes de Partido (District Chiefs) and to ensure the collection and legal investment of municipal funds.

On 15 February 1866, during the administration of president Francisco Dueñas, the House of Senators issued the Código Político y Municipal (Political and Municipal Code), it entered into validity after its publication in the official newspaper El Constitucional on April 4, 1867. this code replaced the Reglament of 1861 which was considered to be in disharmony with the laws that assured the independence of municipal and judicial functionaries and contained "dispositions which were too complicated and impracticable in the management and counting of municipal funds." According to the Code, the municipal councils were proportioned with 1 Alcalde and 1 Síndico with:

- 2 Regidores and 1 proprietary Juez de Paz with 1 auxiliary in populations with 200 to 2000 inhabitants.
- 4 Regidores and 2 proprietary Jueces de Paz with 2 auxiliaries in populations with more than 2000 inhabitants.

The Constitution of 1886 established the character of popular elections in the municipal government. On 8 May 1897, the National Assembly emitted a Law of the Municipal Branch which was sanctioned by the executive office on 16 May. On 28 April 1908 another Law of the Municipal Branch was issued. The Constitution of 1939 passed the election of local governments to the executive office, but in the constitutional reforms made in 1945 and in the Constitution of 1950, political autonomy was returned to the municipalities.

== Requirements for creating a municipality ==
According to Chapter I, Title IV of the Municipal Code, the requirements for the creation of a municipality are:

1. A population of no less than 50,000 inhabitants.
2. A determined territory.
3. A population center with no less than 20,000 inhabitants, which will serve as the seat of its authorities.
4. The possibility of sufficient resources to attend the costs of government, administration and the presentation of essential public services.
5. Conformity with the plans of national development.

The creation, fusion or incorporation of municipalities corresponds to the Legislative Assembly.

== Government ==
The municipal government is exerted by a Consejo Municipal (Municipal Council), which has the characteristics of deliberative and normative. It is integrated by an Alcalde (Mayor), one Sindico (Legal representative) and a number of proprietary Regidores (Council members) that is proportionate to the population and 4 auxiliary Regidores.

The proportion of the amount of Regidores is:

- 2 regidores in municipalities with up to 10,000 inhabitants.
- 4 in those with between 10,000 and 20,000 inhabitants.
- 6 in those with between 20,000 and 50,000 inhabitants.
- 8 in those with between 50,000 and 100,000 inhabitants.
- 10 in those with more than 100,000 inhabitants.

Members of the municipal councils must be both at least 21 and residents of the municipality.

Directly elected, municipal officials serve three-year terms and may be re-elected. Municipios are not all of equal size but are required to have a population of at least 10,000. Boundaries are determined by the Legislative Assembly.

The powers of local government are those given by the central government. Because department governors are appointed by the president, their independence is questionable. Despite their status as elected representatives, the powers of municipal officeholders are also limited in certain key areas. The most glaring example is taxation.

Although the municipal councils are allowed to suggest local taxes and tax rates, only the Legislative Assembly has the power to levy the taxes. Therefore, all funds used by the councils are appropriated and disbursed by the assembly, but such funds are earmarked in the budget and are not incorporated into the central government's general fund.

Among the duties relegated to the municipal councils under the Salvadoran Municipal Code is the holding of town meetings (cabildos abiertos) at least once every three months.

The council is enjoined from acting against the majority opinion expressed at the town meetings. The municipal councils also grant legal recognition (personalidad juridica) to communal associations in their municipios. The councils are required to meet periodically with representatives of the communal associations and to consult with them on the appointment of representatives to advisory and other local commissions. The councils also issue local ordinances and regulations.

== Territorial organization ==
Municipalities are subdivided into one urban area which is the municipal capital and various cantons which comprise its rural population. Cantons are composed of Caseríos.

== See also ==
- List of municipalities and districts of El Salvador
- Departments of El Salvador
- List of cities in El Salvador

== Bibliography ==
- Aguilar Parada, Myron Roberto; Machado Castro, Marvin Alexander; Monge Navas, Ana Yamileth; Quijada Landaverde, Jessica Jassmín; Serrano Henríquez, José Humberto (14 August 2013). Departamento de Derecho Público, Facultad de Jurisprudencia y Ciencias Sociales (ed.). La Historia del Municipio. Municipalismo. Ciudad Universitaria: Universidad de El Salvador.
- Guevara Lacayo, Guillermo Antonio; Alvarenga, Alfonso Aristides; Romero de Torres, Marcia Judith; Hernández Portillo, Pedro Alberto; Posada Sánchez, José Humberto (31 January 1986). Código Municipal. San Salvador.
- Menéndez, Isidro (1855). Recopilación. Vol. 1. San Salvador.
