= Departments of El Salvador =

Administrative divisions of El Salvador

- Location: El Salvador
- Number: 14
- Populations: Smallest: Cabañas (143,049); Largest: San Salvador (1,563,371)
- Areas: Smallest: Cuscatlán (756.2 km^{2}); Largest: Usulután (2,130.4 km^{2})
- Subdivisions: Municipality

El Salvador is divided into 14 departments (Spanish: departamentos) for administrative purposes, subdivided into 44 municipalities (municipios) and 262 districts. The country is a unitary state.

== Departments ==
The following table lists the 14 departments of El Salvador, their capitals, and their area and population. A total of nine out of 14 departments are named after their respective capitals.

Map	Flag	Coat of arms	Department	ISO Code	Capital	Area (km^{2})	Population (2024)	Municipalities	Districts
			Ahuachapán	SV-AH	Ahuachapán	1,239.6	348,880	3	12
			Cabañas	SV-CA	Sensuntepeque	1,103.5	143,049	2	9
			Chalatenango	SV-CH	Chalatenango	2,016.6	185,930	3	33
			Cuscatlán	SV-CU	Cojutepeque	756.2	244,901	2	16
			La Libertad	SV-LI	Santa Tecla	1,652.9	765,879	6	22
			La Paz	SV-PA	Zacatecoluca	1,223.6	318,374	3	22
			La Unión	SV-UN	La Unión	2,074.3	224,375	2	18
			Morazán	SV-MO	San Francisco Gotera	1,447.4	169,784	2	26
			San Miguel	SV-SM	San Miguel	2,077.1	447,634	3	20
			San Salvador	SV-SS	San Salvador	886.2	1,563,371	5	19
			San Vicente	SV-SV	San Vicente	1,184.0	161,857	2	13
			Santa Ana	SV-SA	Santa Ana	2,023.2	552,938	4	13
			Sonsonate	SV-SO	Sonsonate	1,225.2	470,455	4	16
			Usulután	SV-US	Usulután	2,130.4	325,494	3	23

== History ==
12 June 1824: The first Salvadoran constitution within the Federal Republic of Central America establishes a territorial division of four departments, Sonsonate, San Salvador, San Vicente, and San Miguel. Sonsonate was formerly part of Guatemala before this point.

1833–1834: A short lived Department of Tejutla was established from the districts of Metapán and Tejutla in San Salvador.

22 January 1835: The Federal District of San Salvador is separated both from San Salvador department and from the State of Salvador. The remainder of San Salvador department is renamed to Cuscatlan, and Metapan district is transferred to Sonsonate department.

17 May 1839: Cuscatlán's Olocuitla district and San Vicente's Zacatecoluca district are combined into the new department of La Paz.

30 July 1839: The Federal District of San Salvador is dissolved, and San Salvador department is reconstituted, combining the former federal district with Opico district of Cuscatlan.

15 March 1847: La Paz department is abolished and reincorporated into San Vicente.

21 February 1852: La Paz department is restored.

8 February 1855: Santa Ana department is separated from Sonsonate.

14 February 1855: Chalatenango department is separated from Cuscatlán.

26 January 1865: La Libertad department is separated from San Salvador.

22 June 1865: Usulután and La Union departments are separated from San Miguel.

12 February 1869: Ahuachapán department is separated from Santa Ana.

10 February 1873: Cabañas department is created from parts of Cuscatlán and San Vicente.

14 July 1875: Gotera department is separated from San Miguel. It would be renamed to Morazán department on 14 March 1887.

== See also ==
- List of cities in El Salvador
- Municipalities of El Salvador
- Geography of El Salvador
- List of Salvadoran departments by Human Development Index
- Department (administrative division)
- ISO 3166-2:SV
