= Central La Paz =

Municipality in La Paz Department, El Salvador

Central La Paz La Paz Centro (Spanish)
- Municipality
- Location of Central La Paz in El Salvador
- Coordinates: 13°30′30″N 88°57′00″W
- Country: El Salvador
- Department: La Paz
- Established: 1 May 2024
- Municipal seat: Santiago Nonualco
- Districts: 12 districts

Area
  - Total: 405.8 km^{2} (156.7 sq mi)

Population (2024)
  - Total: 114,507
  - Density: 282.2/km^{2} (730.8/sq mi)
- Time zone: UTC−6 (CST)
- Postal code: 01601
- Area code: +503

Central La Paz (Spanish: La Paz Centro) is a municipality in the central region of La Paz Department, El Salvador. Created during El Salvador's 2023–2024 municipal restructuring, it consolidates twelve former municipalities into a single administrative jurisdiction stretching from the central volcanic highlands down to the Pacific coast.

== History ==
In June 2023, the Legislative Assembly of El Salvador approved the Special Law for Municipal Restructuring (Ley Especial para la Reestructuración Municipal), reducing the nation's 262 municipalities to 44. Under this law, which entered into force on 1 May 2024, twelve existing municipalities in central La Paz Department were merged to form the new municipality of Central La Paz, with their former municipal territories reclassified as administrative districts.

== Geography ==
Central La Paz spans an area of 405.8 km^{2} (156.7 sq mi) across the central corridor of La Paz Department, extending from the southern slopes of the San Vicente (Chinchontepec) volcano and the Jiboa River valley in the north to the Pacific Ocean and the Estero de Jaltepeque in the south.

It is bordered to the north by San Vicente Department and Cuscatlán Department, to the east by Eastern La Paz (Zacatecoluca, San Juan Nonualco, and San Rafael Obrajuelo), to the west by Western La Paz (Olocuilta, San Luis Talpa, and San Pedro Masahuat), and to the south by the Pacific Ocean.

== Administrative divisions ==
Central La Paz is divided into twelve administrative districts:

District	Population (2024)	Notes
El Rosario	19,215	Agricultural and commercial hub along the Littoral Highway (CA-2)
Jerusalén	2,340	Northern highland district
Mercedes La Ceiba	1,105	Northern highland district
Paraíso de Osorio	3,120	Northern highland district
San Antonio Masahuat	4,680	Northern highland district
San Emigdio	2,890	Northern highland district
San Juan Tepezontes	3,510	Located near Lake Ilopango's southern ridge
San Luis La Herradura	20,542	Coastal district encompassing Costa del Sol and the Jaltepeque Estuary
San Miguel Tepezontes	5,420	Located near Lake Ilopango's southern ridge
San Pedro Nonualco	9,845	Commercial and agricultural center in the Nonualco highlands
Santa María Ostuma	6,130	Known for pineapple cultivation and annual agricultural festivals
Santiago Nonualco	35,710	Most populous district and administrative seat

== Economy and infrastructure ==
The municipality's economy reflects its diverse geography across three distinct zones:

- Northern highlands: Agriculture centered on coffee, pineapple (particularly in Santa María Ostuma), citrus fruits, and basic grains.
- Central plain: Commercial trade, agro-industry, and logistics along the Littoral Highway (CA-2), which bisects the municipality through El Rosario and Santiago Nonualco.
- Southern coast: Coastal tourism, real estate development, sport and artisanal fishing, and aquaculture centered in San Luis La Herradura and along the Costa del Sol peninsula.

== See also ==
- Municipalities of El Salvador
- Departments of El Salvador
- La Paz Department (El Salvador)
- Costa del Sol (El Salvador)
