= Western La Paz =

Municipality in La Paz Department, El Salvador

Western La Paz La Paz Oeste (Spanish)
- Municipality
- Location of Western La Paz in El Salvador
- Coordinates: 13°34′00″N 89°07′00″W
- Country: El Salvador
- Department: La Paz
- Established: 1 May 2024
- Municipal seat: Olocuilta
- Districts: 7 districts

Area
  - Total: 268.5 km^{2} (103.7 sq mi)

Population (2024)
  - Total: 92,840
  - Density: 345.8/km^{2} (895.5/sq mi)
- Time zone: UTC−6 (CST)
- Postal code: 01601
- Area code: +503

Western La Paz (Spanish: La Paz Oeste) is a municipality covering the western corridor of La Paz Department in south-central El Salvador. Stretching across 268.5 km^{2} (103.7 sq mi) from the southern rim of the Lake Ilopango caldera down to the Pacific Ocean, it consolidates seven constituent districts—Cuyultitán, Olocuilta, San Francisco Chinameca, San Juan Talpa, San Luis Talpa, San Pedro Masahuat, and Tapalhuaca—around its administrative seat in Olocuilta. The municipality houses the El Salvador International Airport in San Luis Talpa, serving as the primary international aviation and air-cargo gateway for El Salvador.

== Aviation, logistics, and industrial corridors ==
Western La Paz occupies a strategic transit zone immediately south of the Metropolitan Area of San Salvador, traversed by the Autopista a Comalapa (RN-5) and the Littoral Highway (CA-2):

- El Salvador International Airport: Located in the coastal plain of San Luis Talpa, the El Salvador International Airport (San Óscar Arnulfo Romero y Galdámez) functions as the principal international passenger hub and regional maintenance/logistics center for Central America.
- Free-trade zones and agro-industry: Along the Comalapa highway corridor through Olocuilta, San Juan Talpa, and San Luis Talpa, industrial parks and export-processing free-trade zones (zonas francas) concentrate textile manufacturing, pharmaceuticals, logistics warehousing, and aeronautical maintenance facilities.
- Culinary and artisanal heritage: Olocuilta is nationally recognized for its traditional production of rice-flour pupusas (pupusas de arroz), sustaining commercial pupusódromo gastronomic corridors along the highway, while Cuyultitán is noted for traditional clay pottery and basketry.

== Geography ==
Western La Paz spans three distinct ecological zones: steep volcanic hills bordering the southern edge of Lake Ilopango in the north (San Francisco Chinameca and Olocuilta), fertile agricultural valleys along the middle basin of the Comalapa and Jiboa rivers, and flat coastal plains bordering the Pacific Ocean in San Luis Talpa and San Pedro Masahuat (including Playa Las Hojas and Playa Amatecampo).

The municipality borders Southern San Salvador (Panchimalco and Santo Tomás) and Eastern San Salvador (Ilopango) to the north, Central La Paz (San Juan Tepezontes, San Antonio Masahuat, El Rosario, and San Luis La Herradura) to the east, the Pacific Ocean to the south, and Coastal La Libertad (La Libertad) and Eastern La Libertad (Huizúcar) to the west.

== Administrative reorganization ==
Under the Special Law for Municipal Restructuring approved by the Legislative Assembly of El Salvador in June 2023 and enacted on 1 May 2024, La Paz Department's twenty-two former municipalities were consolidated into three larger municipal jurisdictions: Western La Paz, Central La Paz, and Eastern La Paz.

| District | Population (2024) | Key characteristics |
|---|---|---|
| Cuyultitán | 6,180 | Valley district between Olocuilta and San Juan Talpa noted for artisanal handicrafts |
| Olocuilta | 32,410 | Most populous district, municipal seat, commercial hub, and national center for rice-flour pupusas |
| San Francisco Chinameca | 7,890 | Northern highland district overlooking Lake Ilopango |
| San Juan Talpa | 8,420 | Industrial and residential corridor town along the Autopista a Comalapa |
| San Luis Talpa | 23,640 | Coastal district housing the El Salvador International Airport and Pacific beaches |
| San Pedro Masahuat | 11,480 | Coastal agricultural and livestock district bordering the Jiboa River |
| Tapalhuaca | 2,820 | Smallest district by population, located in the central foothills |

== See also ==
- Central La Paz
- Eastern La Paz
- La Paz Department (El Salvador)
- Municipalities of El Salvador
