= Eastern La Libertad =

Municipality in La Libertad Department, El Salvador

Eastern La Libertad La Libertad Este (Spanish)
- Municipality
- Location of Eastern La Libertad in El Salvador
- Coordinates: 13°40′00″N 89°15′00″W
- Country: El Salvador
- Department: La Libertad
- Established: 1 May 2024
- Municipal seat: Antiguo Cuscatlán
- Districts: 5 districts

Area
  - Total: 168.4 km^{2} (65.0 sq mi)

Population (2024)
  - Total: 114,890
  - Density: 682.2/km^{2} (1,767/sq mi)
- Time zone: UTC−6 (CST)
- Postal code: 01502
- Area code: +503

Eastern La Libertad (Spanish: La Libertad Este) is a municipality in the eastern urban and foothill corridor of La Libertad Department, El Salvador, forming the southwestern core of the Metropolitan Area of San Salvador. Covering 168.4 km^{2} (65.0 sq mi) across five constituent districts—Antiguo Cuscatlán, Huizúcar, Nuevo Cuscatlán, San José Villanueva, and Zaragoza—it encompasses the highest-income residential enclaves, highest per-capita economic output, and densest concentration of corporate headquarters, embassies, and commercial real estate in the country.

== Socioeconomic profile and real estate ==
Antiguo Cuscatlán and Nuevo Cuscatlán consistently rank among the jurisdictions with the highest Human Development Index (HDI), highest municipal tax revenue per capita, and lowest multidimensional poverty rates in El Salvador. Driven by proximity to the capital and direct highway access to the Pacific coast, Eastern La Libertad has become the primary center for high-value residential, corporate, and commercial real estate development:

- Gated communities and golf infrastructure: San José Villanueva and Nuevo Cuscatlán house several of El Salvador's largest master-planned residential communities and country clubs, notably El Encanto Country Club, which features an 18-hole golf course designed by Dye Designs alongside luxury villas and condominiums, as well as gated enclaves along the Zaragoza–Puerto de La Libertad highway corridor (such as Residencial Los Sueños).
- Corporate, diplomatic, and retail centers: The Santa Elena and La Sultana sectors of Antiguo Cuscatlán concentrate multinational regional headquarters, business process outsourcing (BPO) campuses, five-star hotels, the Embassy of the United States, and major open-air and enclosed retail complexes including Multiplaza and La Gran Vía.
- Higher education: The municipality hosts two of El Salvador's leading private universities: the Central American University (UCA) in Antiguo Cuscatlán and the Escuela Superior de Economía y Negocios (ESEN) in Santa Tecla/Nuevo Cuscatlán's immediate border zone.

== Geography and boundaries ==
Eastern La Libertad slopes southward from the urbanized San Salvador valley floor over the eastern ridges of the Cordillera del Bálsamo toward the coastal foothills above the Pacific plain. The Huiza River (Río Huiza) drains the central and eastern valleys of San José Villanueva, Huizúcar, and Zaragoza southward toward the Pacific coast.

It borders Southern La Libertad (Santa Tecla) and Central San Salvador (San Salvador) to the north, Southern San Salvador (San Marcos, Santo Tomás, Panchimalco, and Rosario de Mora) to the east, Coastal La Libertad (La Libertad) to the south, and Southern La Libertad (Santa Tecla) and Coastal La Libertad (La Libertad) to the west.

== Administrative background ==
In June 2023, the Legislative Assembly of El Salvador approved the Special Law for Municipal Restructuring, consolidating El Salvador's 262 municipalities into 44 effective 1 May 2024. Within La Libertad Department, five eastern jurisdictions were merged to form Eastern La Libertad with its municipal seat in Antiguo Cuscatlán.

District	Population (2024)	Key characteristics
Antiguo Cuscatlán	41,250	Municipal seat; national hub for corporate headquarters, embassies, retail malls, and universities; historically an indigenous Pipil capital (Cuzcatlán)
Huizúcar	15,840	Mountain district in the eastern Cordillera del Bálsamo known for coffee estates and colonial church heritage
Nuevo Cuscatlán	11,420	High-income suburban and vertical residential growth corridor with high per-capita municipal investment
San José Villanueva	19,630	Home to El Encanto golf community, master-planned gated estates, and agricultural foothills
Zaragoza	26,750	Commercial gateway along the Puerto de La Libertad Highway linking San Salvador to the Surf City coast

== See also ==
- Northern La Libertad
- Central La Libertad
- Western La Libertad
- Coastal La Libertad
- Southern La Libertad
- La Libertad Department (El Salvador)
- Municipalities of El Salvador
