= Michelle Sol =

Minister of Housing of El Salvador

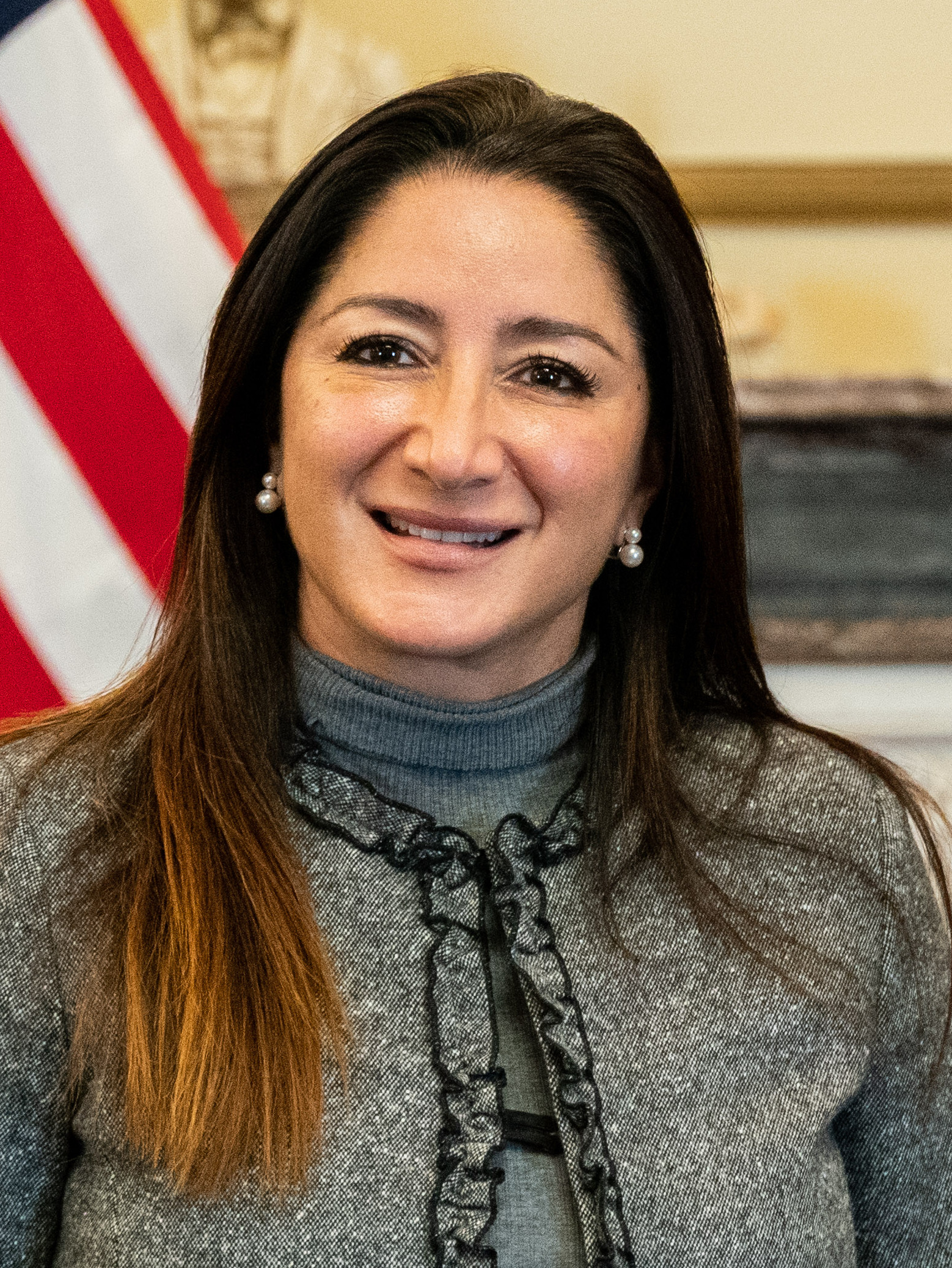

Minister of Housing of El Salvador
- Incumbent
- Assumed office 1 June 2019
- President: Nayib Bukele; Claudia Rodríguez (acting)
- Preceded by: Edín Martínez

Mayor of Nuevo Cuscatlán
- In office 1 May 2015 – 1 June 2019
- Preceded by: Nayib Bukele
- Succeeded by: Roberto Morales

Personal details
- Born: Irma Michelle Martha Ninette Sol; 20 December 1972 (age 53) Nuevo Cuscatlán, El Salvador
- Party: Nuevas Ideas
- Other political affiliations: FMLN (2012–2019)
- Spouse: Ernesto Castro
- Education: José Matías Delgado University
- Occupation: Politician, businesswoman

Irma Michelle Martha Ninette Sol Schweikert de Castro (born 20 December 1972), commonly known Michelle Sol, is a Salvadoran politician and businesswoman who currently serves as the minister of housing of El Salvador. She previously served as the mayor of Nuevo Cuscatlán from 2015 to 2019, and was a candidate for mayor of La Libertad Este in 2024.

== Early life ==
Irma Michelle Martha Ninette Sol Schweikert was born on 20 December 1972 in Nuevo Cuscatlán, El Salvador. Sol is a niece of Ana Ligia Mixco Sol de Saca, the first lady of El Salvador from 2004 to 2009.

Sol studied at the Excellent Municipal Management School in Madrid, Spain, and the Doctor José Matías Delgado University in San Salvador, El Salvador. She received a degree in municipal legislation from the latter. Sol worked as the marketing and public relations director at Tecnutral, a family business.

== Political career ==
=== Mayor of Nuevo Cuscatlán ===
During the 2012 municipal elections, Sol was elected as a council member of the municipal council of Nuevo Cuscatlán. As a council member, she held the position of president of the entrepreneurship and job training center. On 10 February 2015, Nayib Bukele, the mayor of Nuevo Cuscatlán, left the power to administer Nuevo Cuscatlán to Sol while he ran for mayor of San Salvador during the 2015 municipal elections. At the time, Sol was herself running for mayor of Nuevo Cuscatlán as a member of the Farabundo Martí National Liberation Front (FMLN) in a political coalition with Democratic Change. Her primarily opponent was Gerardo Barón from the Nationalist Republican Alliance (ARENA). Sol won the election with 60.79 percent of the vote. Sol assumed office as mayor of Nuevo Cuscatlán on 1 May.

Sol ran for re-election in the 2018 municipal elections with the FMLN in a political coalition with Democratic Change, the Social Democratic Party, and the Salvadoran Progressive Party. Her primary opponent was Nuria Varela from ARENA. Sol won the election, but Varela stated that she would challenge the results for alleged fraud. On 10 March 2018, Attorney General Douglas Meléndez confirmed that there was an investigation into fraud allegations in Nuevo Cuscatlán concerning transferring votes to benefit the FMLN.

=== Minister of Housing ===
In May 2019, Sol was selected by Bukele, who won the 2019 presidential election, to be his minister of housing. Sol was sworn in on 1 June 2019. She was one of the eight women who composed Bukele's cabinet of sixteen ministers. Sol was the first person to hold the position of minister of housing since Edín Martínez left office in 2014.

== 2024 municipal campaign ==
In June 2023, Sol announced she was running for mayor of the new municipality of La Libertad Este, which consists of the now-districts of Antiguo Cuscatlán, Nuevo Cuscatlán, Huizúcar, San José Villanueva, and Zaragoza. Sol's primarily opponent was Milagro Navas from ARENA who was the incumbent mayor of Antiguo Cuscatlán. In February 2024, Navas challenged Sol to a debate, but Sol rejected Navas' challenge, stating that debates were "the politics of the past" ("la política de antes"). Navas defeated Sol.

== Personal life ==
Sol is married to Ernesto Castro, the incumbent president of the Legislative Assembly. The couple owns a food company called Sociedad Castro Sol S.A. de C.V. In 2023, the El Faro digital newspaper revealed that the company received US$504,000 from Salvadoran President Mauricio Funes in 2010 and 2011 to provide services for the Presidential Battalion. El Faro alleged that the payment came from a black budget which Funes supposedly managed.

== Electoral history ==
Year	Office	Type	Party	Main opponent	Party	Votes for Sol				Result	Swing	Ref.
Year	Office	Type	Party	Main opponent	Party	Total	%	P.	±%	Result	Swing	Ref.
2015	Mayor of Nuevo Cuscatlán	General	FMLN–CD	Gerardo Barón	ARENA	4,116	60.79	1st	N/A	Won	Hold	
2018	Mayor of Nuevo Cuscatlán	General	FMLN–CD–PSD–PSP	Nuria Varela	ARENA	?	?	1st	?	Won	Hold	
2024	Mayor of La Libertad Este	General	NI	Milagro Navas	ARENA				N/A	Lost	Hold	

== See also ==
- Cabinet of Nayib Bukele

Political offices
Preceded by Nayib Bukele	Mayor of Nuevo Cuscatlán; 2015–2019	Succeeded by Roberto Morales
Preceded by Edín Martínez	Minister of Housing of El Salvador; 2019–present	Incumbent
