= 1982 El Salvador earthquake =

Earthquake in Central America

- UTC time: 1982-06-19 06:21:58
- ISC event: 597450
- USGS-ANSS: ComCat
- Local date: 19 June 1982
- Local time: 00:21:58
- Duration: 25 s (shaking felt)
- Magnitude: M_{w} 7.3
- Depth: 73 km (45 mi)
- Epicenter: 13.33°N 89.39°W
- Type: Normal
- Areas affected: El Salvador
- Total damage: $5 million
- Max. intensity: MMI VII (Very strong)
- Landslides: Yes
- Casualties: 16–43 dead

The 1982 El Salvador earthquake occurred southeast of San Salvador on 19 June at 00:21 local time (06:21 UTC). This undersea earthquake struck offshore in the Pacific Ocean and had a surface wave magnitude of 7.3 and a maximum Mercalli intensity of VII (Very strong). Occurring adjacent to a subduction zone at the Middle America Trench, this normal-slip shock left at least 16 and as many as 43 people dead, and many injured, and also inflicted $5 million in damage.

== Tectonic setting ==
Near the Salvadorian coast, the Cocos plate is subducting beneath the Caribbean plate at the Middle America Trench. This earthquake was an intra-slab, normal-slip subduction earthquake in the subducting plate. The subduction zone and a local system of faults along the volcanic chain are two major sources of the earthquakes in El Salvador.

== Earthquake ==
The mechanism of this earthquake had many similarities with the El Salvador earthquake of 13 January 2001.

=== Intensity ===
The intensity in San Salvador reached VII (Very strong). The most affected cities are San Salvador, Ahuachapán, Concepción de Ataco, Comasagua, San Miguel, San Pedro Nonualco, and San Juan Tepezontes. This earthquake could be felt in Guatemala, Honduras, Nicaragua, and Costa Rica, with intensities V (Moderate) in Guatemala City, Guatemala, IV (Light) in Tegucigalpa, Honduras, V in Managua, Nicaragua, and III (Weak) in San José, Costa Rica.

== See also ==
- List of earthquakes in El Salvador
