= Eastern La Paz =

Municipality in La Paz Department, El Salvador

Eastern La Paz La Paz Este (Spanish)
- Municipality
- Location of Eastern La Paz in El Salvador
- Coordinates: 13°30′29″N 88°52′08″W
- Country: El Salvador
- Department: La Paz
- Established: 1 May 2024
- Municipal seat: Zacatecoluca
- Districts: 3 districts

Area
  - Total: 521.4 km^{2} (201.3 sq mi)

Population (2024)
  - Total: 94,180
  - Density: 180.6/km^{2} (467.8/sq mi)
- Time zone: UTC−6 (CST)
- Postal code: 01601
- Area code: +503

Eastern La Paz (Spanish: La Paz Este) is a municipality occupying the eastern half of La Paz Department in south-central El Salvador. Spanning 521.4 km^{2} (201.3 sq mi) from the southern slopes of the San Vicente (Chinchontepec) volcano down to the Pacific Ocean and the mouth of the Lempa River, it consolidates three constituent districts—San Juan Nonualco, San Rafael Obrajuelo, and Zacatecoluca—around the departmental capital of Zacatecoluca.

== Historical background ==
Eastern La Paz forms the historical core of the Nonualco region, inhabited prior to Spanish colonization by Nahuat-speaking Pipil communities. In 1833, Santiago Nonualco, San Juan Nonualco, and Zacatecoluca were the epicenter of the indigenous peasant uprising led by Anastasio Aquino, who briefly proclaimed himself leader of the Nonualcos before the rebellion was suppressed by federal forces.

Zacatecoluca was granted city status in 1844 and became the permanent departmental capital of La Paz Department upon its definitive establishment in 1852. Following the passage of the Special Law for Municipal Restructuring in June 2023 and its implementation on 1 May 2024, Zacatecoluca was merged with neighboring San Juan Nonualco and San Rafael Obrajuelo to form the modern municipality of Eastern La Paz.

== Geography and ecosystems ==
Eastern La Paz is the largest of La Paz Department's three municipalities by land area, encompassing over 40 percent of the department's territory. Its northern boundary rises onto the southern flanks of the San Vicente volcano, while its central and southern zones broaden into the fertile alluvial plains of the Bajo Lempa (Lower Lempa River basin).

Along the Pacific coast, the eastern tip of the Estero de Jaltepeque and the western estuary of the Lempa River delta enclose Isla Montecristo and extensive coastal mangrove wetlands recognized as part of the Jaltepeque Ramsar wetland complex.

The municipality borders Northern San Vicente (Guadalupe) and Southern San Vicente (San Vicente and Tecoluca) to the north and east across the Lempa River, the Pacific Ocean to the south, and Central La Paz (San Pedro Nonualco, Santiago Nonualco, and San Luis La Herradura) to the west.

== Constituent districts ==
Eastern La Paz comprises three administrative districts:

District	Population (2024)	Key characteristics
San Juan Nonualco	18,420	Highland and valley district on the southern slopes of San Vicente volcano, noted for colonial heritage and agriculture
San Rafael Obrajuelo	11,640	Compact commercial and agricultural district situated immediately west of Zacatecoluca along the Littoral Highway
Zacatecoluca	64,120	Departmental capital, municipal seat, regional commercial/hospital center, and birthplace of independence leader José Simeón Cañas

== Economy and infrastructure ==
- Agro-industry and livestock: The Bajo Lempa coastal plain is one of central El Salvador's primary zones for sugarcane cultivation, cattle ranching, dairy production, basic grains, and aquaculture (shrimp farming).
- Regional commerce and public services: Zacatecoluca serves as the administrative, judicial, educational, and healthcare hub for eastern La Paz, anchored by the Santa Teresa National Hospital and regional markets.
- Transit corridors: The municipality is bisected east-to-west by the Littoral Highway (CA-2), which crosses the Lempa River via the San Marcos Lempa Bridge into Usulután Department, as well as Route RN-7 connecting Zacatecoluca northward over the volcanic saddle toward San Vicente.

== See also ==
- Western La Paz
- Central La Paz
- La Paz Department (El Salvador)
- Municipalities of El Salvador
