= Nonoalca =

Mesoamerican ethnic group

The Nonoalca or Nonoalca Chichimeca were a group of people in postclassic Mesoamerica who played an important role in the city of Tula and interacted with the Toltec proper. By the time of European contact they spoke a dialect of Nahuatl, but they may have originally had their own language.

== Etymology ==
The most common theory behind the name "Nonoalca" derives it from nonotli/nontli. This gives it the meaning "mutes", which could refer to them originally being non-Nahuatl speakers. However, Ángel María Garibay K. argues that it instead derives from onoc, meaning "to be established somewhere".

== Origin ==
According to Fernando de Alva Cortés Ixtlilxóchitl, the Nonoalca originated in Tlapallan/Huehuetlapallan (possibly located near Honduras or Coatzacoalcos) and subsequently migrated successively to Tuxtepec, Quiahuiztlan, Zacatlán, Papantla, Huejutla, Tulancingo, and finally Tula. On the other hand, the Historia Tolteca-Chichimeca traces their origin to Chicomoztoc.

Mexican archaeologist Wigberto Jiménez-Moreno identified the Nonoalca with metalworking Nahuas originally from the Teotihuacan civilization who, after its decline, had settled among and been culturally influenced by the Classic Veracruz culture, and Enrique Florescano also connected them to the culture of Teotihuacan. They may have also been influenced by the Maya civilization. Jiménez-Moreno proposed that the Nonoalca were "Mazatec-Popolocas, more or less Nahuatized" based on their location next to these peoples.

== In Tula ==
According to the Historia Tolteca-Chichimeca, the Nonoalca were guided to Tula by their rulers Xelhua, Ueuetzin, Quauhtzin and Citlalmacuetzin in the year 1 Flint. They arrived jointly with the Toltec, with whom they formed a sort of confederation in which the Toltec were the dominant group. Both groups stayed in Tula for three centuries, and initially enjoyed a peaceful coexistence.

The Toltec and Nonoalca together travelled to Cholula to have their septums pierced, symbolizing them shedding the label of Chichimeca and becoming "civilized". The Nonoalca stayed in Cholula as vassals. Accounts differ as to how the Nonoalca were freed from servitude. One version recounts that the Toltec sent a message encouraging the Nonoalca to abandon Cholula and live with them in Tula, which they did without being pursued. Another version claims that the Toltec invaded Cholula and freed the Nonoalca in a war.

The last Toltec ruler Huemac asked the Nonoalca to guard his palace as a way to coerce them into adopting a sedentary lifestyle. The Nonoalca obliged despite this being an insult. Huemac then asked the Nonoalca to bring him a woman with hips four arm-lengths wide (probably a reference to the fertility cult of Cihuacōātl. They brought four women before him, but he was unsatisfied and refused them. The Nonoalca were angered and left, and Huamec sacrificed the women. The Nonoalca entered into rebellion against Huemac and gained the support of the Toltec rulers Icxicouatl and Quetzalteueyac, and together they managed to chase Huemac to the cave 1 House (Cencalco) where he died violently in accordance with his unlucky birth sign.

There is also a narrative of an internal conflict or civil war at Tula between the Toltec and Nonoalca. It is also depicted as a struggle between Quetzalcoatl and Tezcatlipoca after their respective patron deities. The Nonoalca prevailed, and the Toltec followers of Quetzalcoatl were exiled to the east.

== After Tula ==
After the fall of Tula, they moved south, settling in Izúcar de Matamoros, Zongolica, Tehuacán, Teotitlán de Flores Magón, and Coxcatlán, guided by their legendary progenitor Xelhua who died on the journey. On this journey they stopped in Amecameca and Tepoztlán, and some stayed behind in those places. They were also present in Xaltocan. Neighborhoods called Nonoalco existed in many cities in the Valley of Mexico, such as Tlatelolco, Tacubaya, Chiautla and Coatlinchan, and were likely home to Nonoalca. Some seem to have moved to Tabasco and the Laguna de Términos, later moving to the Yucatán Peninsula where they were associated with the cults of Chaac and Kukulkan, and this is supported by Chimalpahin and Torquemada locating Nonoalco (country of the Nonoalca) in these regions, with Chimalpahin equating it to Tlapallan. They are also sometimes postulated as partially ancestral to the Pipil of Central America, where multiple towns bear their name to this day (Santiago Nonualco, San Juan Nonualco, San Pedro Nonualco). The metalworkers from the gulf coast who the Lienzo de Jucutacato describes as settling in Jucutácato (now a district of Uruapan), Michoacán during the postclassic period may have been Nonoalca.

== Other ==
The name "Nonoalca" was also given to a small sailing boat that Bill Verity sailed across the Atlantic to Fenit harbour in Tralee Bay in 1966, and 3,500 miles in the Gulf of Mexico in 1965.
