= Western La Libertad =

Municipality in La Libertad Department, El Salvador

Western La Libertad La Libertad Oeste (Spanish)
- Municipality
- Location of Western La Libertad in El Salvador
- Coordinates: 13°43′30″N 89°22′00″W
- Country: El Salvador
- Department: La Libertad
- Established: 1 May 2024
- Municipal seat: Colón
- Districts: 5 districts

Area
  - Total: 244.6 km^{2} (94.4 sq mi)

Population (2024)
  - Total: 162,890
  - Density: 665.9/km^{2} (1,725/sq mi)
- Time zone: UTC−6 (CST)
- Postal code: 01512
- Area code: +503

Western La Libertad (Spanish: La Libertad Oeste) is a municipality covering the western interior and mountain ridge of La Libertad Department, El Salvador. Spanning 244.6 km^{2} (94.4 sq mi) between the southern edge of the Zapotitán Valley and the peaks of the Cordillera del Bálsamo, it unites five administrative districts—Colón, Jayaque, Sacacoyo, Talnique, and Tepecoyo—with its municipal seat in Colón.

== Administrative creation ==
Under the Special Law for Municipal Restructuring approved by the Legislative Assembly of El Salvador in June 2023 and enacted on 1 May 2024, La Libertad Department's twenty-two former municipalities were consolidated into six larger municipal jurisdictions. Five western jurisdictions were unified to create Western La Libertad, while the remaining seventeen jurisdictions formed Northern La Libertad, Central La Libertad, Eastern La Libertad, Coastal La Libertad, and Southern La Libertad.

== Geography ==
Western La Libertad features sharp elevation contrasts, rising from the fertile lowland plains of northern Colón and Sacacoyo into the steep volcanic ridges of the Cordillera del Bálsamo across Jayaque, Talnique, and Tepecoyo.

The municipality is bordered to the north by Central La Libertad (Ciudad Arce and San Juan Opico), to the east by Southern La Libertad (Santa Tecla) and Coastal La Libertad (Tamanique), to the south by Coastal La Libertad (Comasagua, Chiltiupán, and Teotepeque), and to the west by Eastern Sonsonate (Armenia, San Julián, and Cuisnahuat).

== Districts ==
Western La Libertad comprises five administrative districts:

District	Population (2024)	Profile
Colón	126,410	Most populous district, municipal seat, and major suburban/industrial corridor (including Lourdes)
Jayaque	12,180	Highland coffee-producing town in the Cordillera del Bálsamo
Sacacoyo	13,450	Valley agricultural and residential district along the highway toward Sonsonate
Talnique	5,420	Mountain agricultural district located southeast of Jayaque
Tepecoyo	5,430	Western highland district noted for coffee and balsam tree cultivation

== Economy and infrastructure ==
- Suburban growth and light industry: Colón—particularly the urban corridor of Lourdes—has experienced rapid residential, commercial, and industrial expansion as part of the western commuter belt of the Metropolitan Area of San Salvador, housing industrial parks, logistics centers, and large-scale housing developments.
- Transit corridors: The municipality is traversed by the Pan-American Highway (CA-1) through the Los Chorros canyon linking Santa Tecla with Lourdes and western El Salvador, as well as Route CA-8 connecting Lourdes westward toward Armenia and Sonsonate.
- Highland agriculture: The mountain districts of Jayaque, Talnique, and Tepecoyo are traditional producers of shade-grown coffee, citrus fruits, and balsam of Peru (Myroxylon balsamum), a resin historically harvested along the Cordillera del Bálsamo.

== See also ==
- La Libertad Department (El Salvador)
- Municipalities of El Salvador
