= San José Villanueva =

- District
- Interactive map of San José Villanueva
- Coordinates: 13°34′N 89°16′W
- Country: El Salvador
- Department: La Libertad
- Municipality: La Libertad Este
- Founded: 1868 (as a village)
- Town status: 20 February 1914

Government
  - Mayor: Milagro Navas (ARENA)
  - District Director: (Appointed by Municipal Council)

Area
  - District: 34.37 km^{2} (13.27 sq mi)
- Elevation: 552 m (1,811 ft)

Population (2024)
  - District: 19,150
  - Estimate (2026): 20,355
  - Rank: 77th in El Salvador
  - Density: 557.2/km^{2} (1,443/sq mi)
  - Urban: 17,740
  - Rural: 1,410

San José Villanueva is a district in the municipality of La Libertad Este, located in the La Libertad Department of El Salvador. Following the 2024 administrative restructuring, the former municipality was converted into a district under the jurisdiction of the new municipal seat in Antiguo Cuscatlán.

== History ==
The area has been inhabited since the pre-Columbian era, evidenced by the significant rock art found at the Piedra Pintada site. Historically, the settlement grew as an agricultural colony during the mid-19th century and was officially established as a village (aldea) in 1868. It was later elevated to the status of a town (villa) on 20 February 1914.

For over a century, its economy was defined by coffee production and basic grains. However, since the late 1990s, the district has undergone a rapid transformation into a high-end residential zone, hosting several gated communities (urbanizaciones privadas) due to its proximity to the San Salvador metropolitan area.

== Geography ==
The district covers an area of 34.37 square kilometres (13.27 sq mi) and sits at an average elevation of 552 metres (1,811 ft). It borders Nuevo Cuscatlán to the north, Huizúcar to the east, the port of La Libertad to the south, and Zaragoza to the west.

== Culture and Landmarks ==
The most notable landmark is the Piedra Pintada ("Painted Stone"), a large rock panel featuring pre-Hispanic petroglyphs and motifs located in the hills of Cantón Arada Vieja.

The district's patron saint festivities (fiestas patronales) are celebrated from March 18 to 19 in honor of Saint Joseph. A significant local tradition is the Festival del Maíz (Corn Festival) held in November, featuring parades and artisanal dresses made from corn husks.
