= Santiago Nonualco =

- District
- Location in El Salvador
- Coordinates: 13°31′N 88°57′W
- Country: El Salvador
- Department: La Paz

Area
  - District: 48.46 sq mi (125.51 km^{2})
- Elevation: 400 ft (122 m)

Population (2024)
  - District: 42,254
  - Estimate (2026): 42,756
  - Rank: 35th in El Salvador
  - Urban: 30,943
  - Rural: 11,311
  - Ethnicities density: 42/sq mi (16/km^{2})

Santiago Nonualco is a municipality in La Paz department of El Salvador.

"Nonualco" means "tribe of mutes" in the native Nahuat language, referring to the Nonoalca people who settled here around 900 CE. There are three "Nonualcos" in the area, the other two are San Juan Nonualco and San Pedro Nonualco.

Santiago Nonualco is a relatively poor community even by Salvadoran standards. The primary historical economic activity has been subsistence farming and the cultivation of sugar cane, providing back-breaking work for those willing to bake in the sun swinging their "corvos," curved tobacco-knife like machetes, for a couple of dollars a day. Currently there are very few employers in the area. Santiago Nonualco has a small central market, a few modest stores (tiendas), diners (comedores), bars, doctor's office, pharmacy, a couple of dentists, a small bank (casa de credito), some lawyers, and not much else. The nearest factories are located near the airport at El Pedregal, about 25 minutes away by bus.

== Warrior son ==
Santiago Nonualco has one famous native son, one warrior. Anastasio "Indio" Aquino, gained fame leading an uprising against the Spanish in 1832–3. He led his insurgency from a cave located just north of what is now El Salvador International Airport. "La cueva de Indio Aquino" (Indio Aquino's cave) is a little-visited site located in Cerro El Tigre overlooking the Jiboa River and the airport. After a seven-month-long rebellion, Indio Aquino was captured and executed by firing squad in San Vicente.
