= Southern La Libertad =

Municipality in La Libertad Department, El Salvador

Southern La Libertad La Libertad Sur (Spanish)
- Municipality
- Location of Southern La Libertad in El Salvador
- Coordinates: 13°40′37″N 89°17′23″W
- Country: El Salvador
- Department: La Libertad
- Established: 1 May 2024
- Municipal seat: Santa Tecla
- Districts: 2 districts

Area
  - Total: 212.4 km^{2} (82.0 sq mi)

Population (2024)
  - Total: 148,790
  - Density: 700.5/km^{2} (1,814/sq mi)
- Time zone: UTC−6 (CST)
- Postal code: 01501
- Area code: +503

Southern La Libertad (Spanish: La Libertad Sur) is a municipality in the south-central highland and metropolitan corridor of La Libertad Department, El Salvador. Spanning 212.4 km^{2} (82.0 sq mi) from the crater rim of the San Salvador volcano across the western urban core of the Metropolitan Area of San Salvador into the Cordillera del Bálsamo, it unites two constituent districts—Comasagua and Santa Tecla—around the departmental capital of Santa Tecla.

== Historical and architectural heritage ==
Southern La Libertad's urban center originated in 1854 when President José María San Martín decreed the founding of Nueva San Salvador (later renamed Santa Tecla) to serve as El Salvador's provisional capital after a devastating earthquake destroyed San Salvador. Although the national capital returned to San Salvador in 1858, Santa Tecla developed into the administrative seat of La Libertad Department upon the department's creation in 1865 and prospered as a principal center of El Salvador's late-19th- and early-20th-century coffee boom.

This era left a distinct architectural legacy in central Santa Tecla, including the neoclassical Palacio Tecleño, the neo-Gothic Church of El Carmen, and grid-planned avenues modeled on European urban design. In the neighboring mountain district of Comasagua, historic coffee estates (fincas) and indigenous-rooted highland communities maintained agricultural and artisanal traditions along the ridge of the Cordillera del Bálsamo.

== Volcanic geography and protected areas ==
The municipality's topography is dominated by two major volcanic and mountain formations:

- San Salvador Volcano (El Boquerón): The northern sector of Santa Tecla rises onto the southern and western flanks of the San Salvador volcano, encompassing El Boquerón National Park at the 1,800 m (5,900 ft) crater rim, which overlooks the 500 m (1,600 ft)-deep volcanic crater and the Boqueroncito cinder cone.
- Cordillera del Bálsamo: South of the urban valley floor, the terrain climbs sharply into the rugged peaks and cloud-forest ridges of Comasagua, including the Peñón de Comasagua, a prominent volcanic rock outcrop and scenic viewpoint overlooking both the central valley and the Pacific coastal plain.

Southern La Libertad borders Northern La Libertad (Quezaltepeque) and Central La Libertad (San Juan Opico) to the north, Central San Salvador (San Salvador) and Eastern La Libertad (Antiguo Cuscatlán, Nuevo Cuscatlán, and Zaragoza) to the east, Coastal La Libertad (La Libertad and Tamanique) to the south, and Western La Libertad (Colón, Jayaque, and Talnique) to the west.

== Administrative reorganization ==
Under the Special Law for Municipal Restructuring approved by the Legislative Assembly of El Salvador in June 2023 and effective on 1 May 2024, La Libertad Department's twenty-two former municipalities were consolidated into six larger municipal jurisdictions.

District	Population (2024)	Key characteristics
Comasagua	14,210	Highland district in the Cordillera del Bálsamo known for specialty coffee, eco-tourism, and pressed-flower handicrafts
Santa Tecla	134,580	Departmental capital, municipal seat, commercial/cultural hub (Paseo El Carmen), and gateway to El Boquerón National Park

== Economy and urban life ==
- Commerce, services, and education: Santa Tecla serves as a major commercial, financial, healthcare, and educational hub for western Greater San Salvador, featuring the Paseo El Carmen cultural and dining district, the Cafetalón municipal sports complex, and regional university campuses.
- Specialty coffee and eco-tourism: The upper slopes of El Boquerón and the mountain ridges of Comasagua produce high-altitude specialty coffee and sustain mountain restaurants, hiking trails, and artisanal workshops—notably Comasagua's traditional handcrafted pressed-flower art (artesanías de flores secas).

== See also ==
- Northern La Libertad
- Central La Libertad
- Western La Libertad
- Eastern La Libertad
- Coastal La Libertad
- La Libertad Department (El Salvador)
- Municipalities of El Salvador
