= Coastal La Libertad =

Municipality in La Libertad Department, El Salvador

Coastal La Libertad La Libertad Costa (Spanish)
- Municipality
- Location of Coastal La Libertad in El Salvador
- Coordinates: 13°29′18″N 89°19′15″W
- Country: El Salvador
- Department: La Libertad
- Established: 1 May 2024
- Municipal seat: La Libertad
- Districts: 5 districts

Area
  - Total: 461.8 km^{2} (178.3 sq mi)

Population (2024)
  - Total: 69,415
  - Density: 150.3/km^{2} (389.3/sq mi)
- Time zone: UTC−6 (CST)
- Postal code: 01501
- Area code: +503

Coastal La Libertad (Spanish: La Libertad Costa) is a municipality occupying the entire Pacific littoral of La Libertad Department in central El Salvador. Stretching across 461.8 km^{2} (178.3 sq mi) between the southern slopes of the Cordillera del Bálsamo and the Pacific Ocean, it consolidates five coastal and mountain-slope districts—Chiltiupán, Jicalapa, La Libertad, Tamanique, and Teotepeque—around the port city of La Libertad. The municipality serves as the primary hub of El Salvador's Surf City coastal tourism corridor.

== Maritime history and coastal geography ==
The municipal seat of La Libertad was formally opened to international maritime commerce in 1831, serving throughout the 19th and early 20th centuries as El Salvador's primary port for exporting coffee and balsam of Peru (Myroxylon balsamum), which was harvested along the coastal mountain range known as the Costa del Bálsamo.

Topographically, Coastal La Libertad transitions from the steep volcanic ridges of the Cordillera del Bálsamo in the north down to rocky headlands, river mouths, and dark volcanic-sand beaches along the Pacific shore. In the east, around San Diego and the Huiza River mouth, the terrain widens into flat coastal alluvial plains bordering La Paz Department.

The municipality is bordered to the north by Western La Libertad (Tepecoyo, Talnique, and Jayaque), Southern La Libertad (Comasagua and Santa Tecla), and Eastern La Libertad (Zaragoza, San José Villanueva, and Huizúcar), to the east by Western La Paz (Olocuilta and San Luis Talpa), to the south by the Pacific Ocean, and to the west by Eastern Sonsonate (Cuisnahuat and Santa Isabel Ishuatán).

== Surfing, tourism, and protected areas ==
- Surf City corridor and world-class breaks: The coastline of Coastal La Libertad is internationally recognized for consistent right-hand point breaks fueled by southern Pacific swells, hosting multiple World Surfing Games and World Surf League (WSL) Championship Tour events. Key surf beaches include Punta Roca and La Paz in La Libertad; El Tunco, El Sunzal, and El Palmarcito in Tamanique; El Zonte in Chiltiupán; and Mizata in Teotepeque.
- Waterfront redevelopment: The port area of La Libertad features an artisanal fishing pier, a seafood market, the Malecón boardwalk, and Sunset Park, a beachfront amusement and recreational complex operated by the Salvadoran Institute of Tourism (ISTU).
- Walter Thilo Deininger National Park: Located in eastern La Libertad district, Walter Thilo Deininger National Park protects 732 ha (1,810 acres) of tropical dry forest and coastal ecosystem, maintaining hiking trails, caves, and native wildlife habitats.

== Administrative reorganization ==
Under the Special Law for Municipal Restructuring approved by the Legislative Assembly of El Salvador in June 2023 and implemented on 1 May 2024, La Libertad Department's twenty-two former municipalities were consolidated into six larger municipal jurisdictions.

District	Population (2024)	Key characteristics
Chiltiupán	11,480	Western coastal and mountain district encompassing Playa El Zonte
Jicalapa	6,120	Highland and coastal district in the Costa del Bálsamo
La Libertad	32,840	Most populous district, municipal seat, historic port, Punta Roca surf break, and Walter Thilo Deininger National Park
Tamanique	12,890	Central coastal and waterfall district encompassing Playa El Tunco, Playa El Sunzal, and the Tamanique Waterfalls
Teotepeque	6,085	Westernmost district bordering Sonsonate Department and encompassing Playa Mizata

== See also ==
- Northern La Libertad
- Central La Libertad
- Western La Libertad
- Eastern La Libertad
- Southern La Libertad
- La Libertad Department (El Salvador)
- Municipalities of El Salvador
