= Nuevo Cuscatlán =

Nuevo Cuscatlán Ciudad de Nuevo Cuscatlán
- District
- Nuevo Cuscatlan
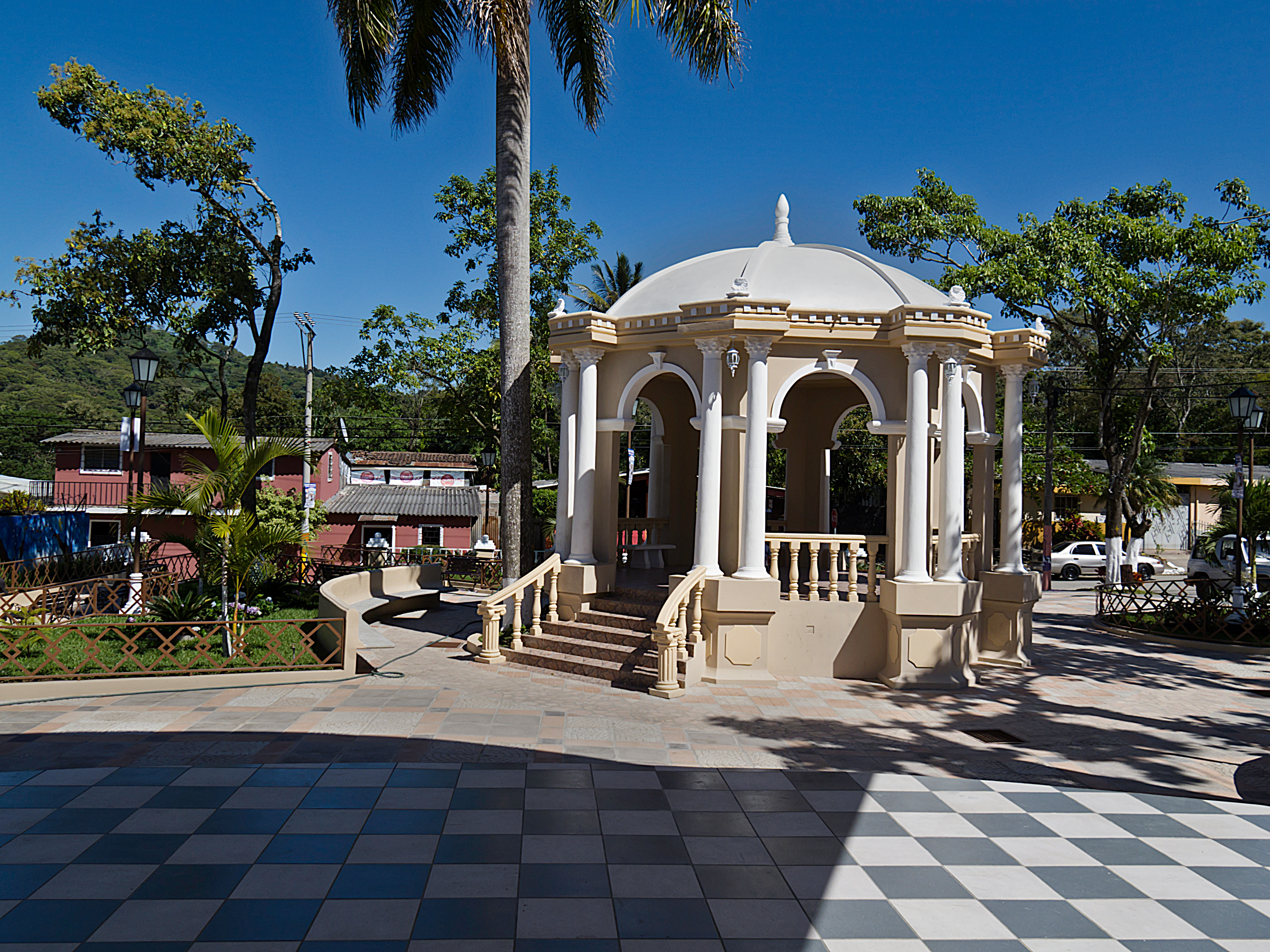
- Nuevo Cuscatlán

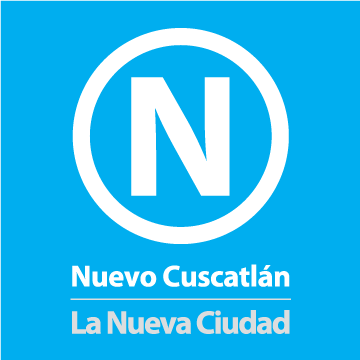
- Flag
- Nickname: La Joya
- Location in El Salvador
- Coordinates: 13°39′N 89°16′W
- Country: El Salvador
- Department: La Libertad
- Municipality: La Libertad Este
- Founded: 1853
- Town Incorporated: 2005
- Seat: Mayor

Government
  - Type: Mayor - Council Government
  - Mayor: Milagro Navas (as Mayor of La Libertad Este)(Alianza Republicana Nacionalista)
  - Council members: Edwin Gilberto Orellana; Rafael Hernandez Dale; Claudia Cristina Ventura; Anna Maria Copien; Juan Jose Alas Castillo; Francisco Antonio Castellón; Carlos Humberto Mendoza; Yolanda Concepción Peña; Elizabeth Andrade de Jovel

Area
  - District: 15.61 km^{2} (6.03 sq mi)
- Elevation: 969 m (3,179 ft)

Population (2024)
  - District: 12,699
  - Estimate (2026): 11,341
  - Rank: 111th in El Salvador
  - Density: 817/km^{2} (2,115/sq mi)
  - Urban: 12,689
  - Rural: 10
- Demonym(s): neocuscatleco, -ca
- Time zone: UTC-6 (Central Standard Time)

Nuevo Cuscatlán is a district in the department of La Libertad in El Salvador. It is located 13 kilometers from San Salvador. It borders the north and east with Antiguo Cuscatlán, the south with Huizúcar and San José Villanueva, and the west with Santa Tecla.

In 2024, the district had a population of 12,699 inhabitants. The territorial extension of the city is 15.61 square kilometers, and it maintains an average height of 920 meters above sea level. The region, covered by native plants, has a dry tropical climate, its temperatures range between 18° and 32 °C throughout the year.

It is also known for being the place where the popular President Nayib Bukele started his political journey by being elected as Mayor.

== History ==
On April 11, 1853, President Francisco Dueñas Díaz issued an executive agreement ordering the foundation of a town that bore the name of Joya Grande, land belonging to Don Francisco Escalón. Its first inhabitants came from Valle de la Joya, Antiguo Cuscatlán and other nearby places. On September 6, 1854, the agreement was finally formalized, assigning the place the name of Nuevo Cuscatlán. In the session of March 13, 1854, the Legislative Chamber approved the establishment of this municipality and broadly empowered the Executive Power, at that time chaired by Colonel José María San Martín, "so that, after the necessary reports, designate the limits of the jurisdiction of said town" and as of January 1865, the town becomes part of the department of La Libertad. According to the statistics of the department of La Libertad made by Governor José López on May 23, 1865, the population was 416 people. On September 7, 2005, it obtained the title of town. In 2016 the Legislative Assembly of El Salvador, with the vote of all the political forces present, granted the title of city to the municipality of Nuevo Cuscatlán.

== Government ==
The municipal government is exercised by a municipal council, integrated and presided over by a mayor, complemented by a trustee and several aldermen.

=== Results of municipal elections in Nuevo Cuscatlán ===
Municipal Elections 2021
Candidate	Party	Vote
José Manuel Dueñas	Nuevas Ideas	3,444
Ever Escobar	ARENA	1,922

Municipal Elections 2018
Candidate	Party	Votes
Michelle Sol	FMLN	3,287
Nuria Varela	ARENA	3,031

Municipal Elections 2015
Candidate	Party	Votes
Michelle Sol	FMLN	3,937
Gerardo Barón	ARENA	2,577

Municipal Elections 2012
Candidate	Party	Votes
Nayib Bukele	FMLN	2,754
Álvaro Rodríguez	ARENA	2,585

== Economy ==
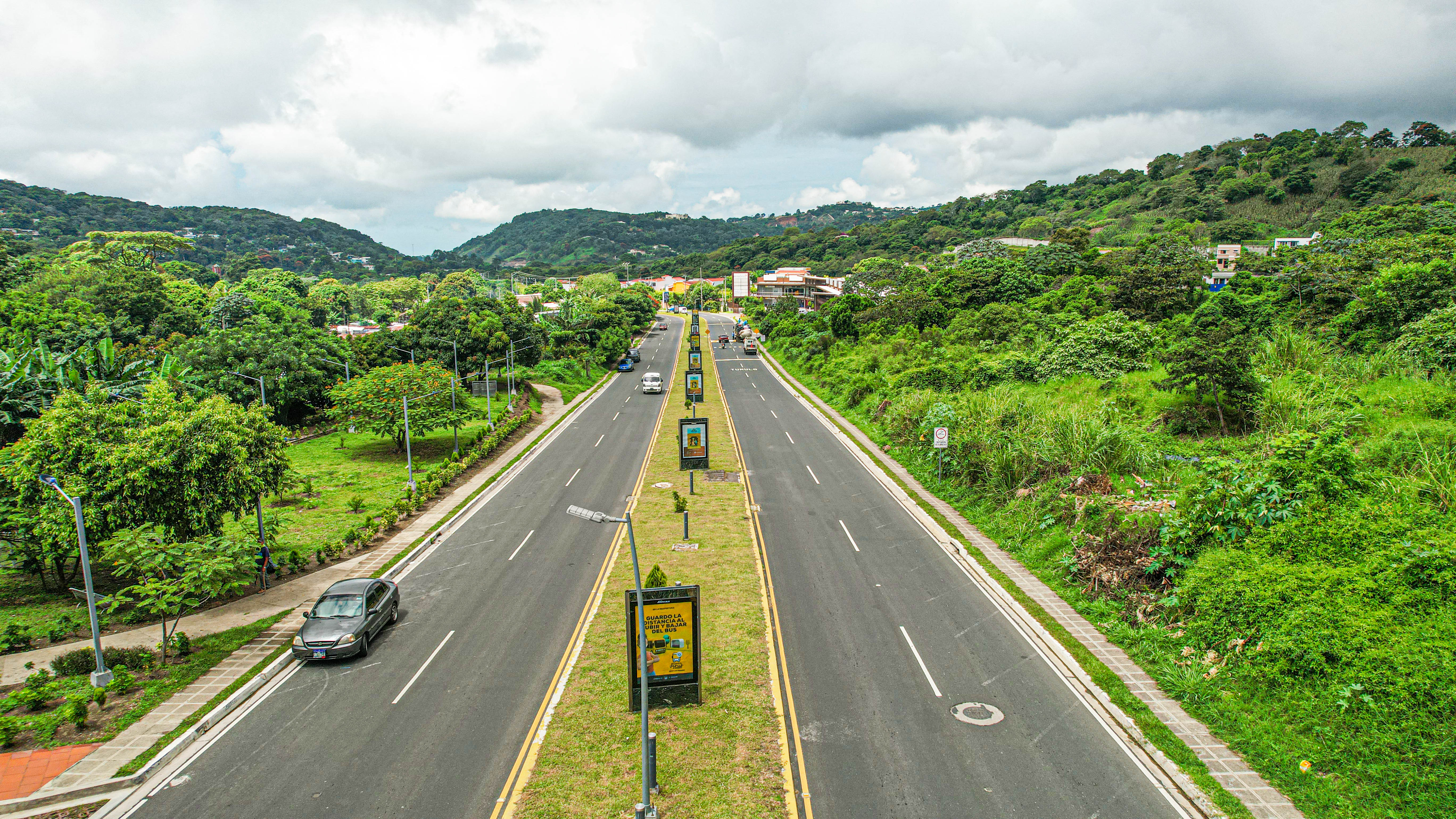
Aerial view, Cuscatlan Boulevard

Nuevo Cuscatlán has coffee as one of its main economic pillars, numerous coffee farms are located on the outskirts of the city. During the administration of Nayib Bukele, Boulevard Cuscatlán was inaugurated, which facilitated the connection and commercial connections between the municipalities of Huizúcar and Antiguo Cuscatlán. The investment allocated to this infrastructure work was $1.6 million, it has an extension of 743 linear meters and four lanes. Over the years, the municipality has developed innovative strategies that have boosted the local economy, employment, investment and business, allowing it to stand out as a destination for modernity and progress. The main malls in Nuevo Cuscatlán are:

- Los Suenos Mall
- Las Palmas Mall
- La Joya Mall
- New Cuscatlan Municipal Market
- Greenside Plaza
- Paradise square

In 2013, the Mayor's Office of Nuevo Cuscatlán, led by Nayib Bukele, launched the NUCU brand, an autochthonous crafts company that allowed the empowerment of Neo-Cuscatlán women. In the real estate sector, Nuevo Cuscatlán has grown exponentially and Several residential and commercial projects have been developed, among the main ones are:

- Infinity tower
- LIFE
- Park Tower
- Epic Plaza (under construction)
- Salamanca Events

== Education ==
The town has three public schools close to the downtown, that are Pedro Pablo Castillo School Center, Hacienda Florencia School Center and Caserío El Cajón School Center, but also has the private Cuscatlán Bilingual School. During the administration of Nayib Bukele launched a scholarship program, created with the purpose of financing the university career for young people born in Nuevo Cuscatlán, the scholarship holders have the possibility of choosing the university and career at will, in exchange, they perform social work in the most needy communities of the municipality. In addition, the construction of the first public Library in town began. In 2015, the Ministry of Education declared Nuevo Cuscatlán the third municipality in La Libertad to be free of illiteracy on June 19.

== Culture ==
The festivities in the town are on March 19, in honor to San José in the parish of the same name, during them parades are held through the main streets and avenues, the queen of said festivities is also chosen, which are accompanied with music and fireworks. In August, the San José parish usually holds the Corn Festival. In the corn festival, products derived from corn are sold, such as atol, tamales, corn on the cob, riguas and pupusas. On the outskirts of Nuevo Cuscatlan on the road that leads to Huizucar is the Salamanca complex, which is widely used for various cultural activities, concerts and entrepreneurial markets.

== Health ==
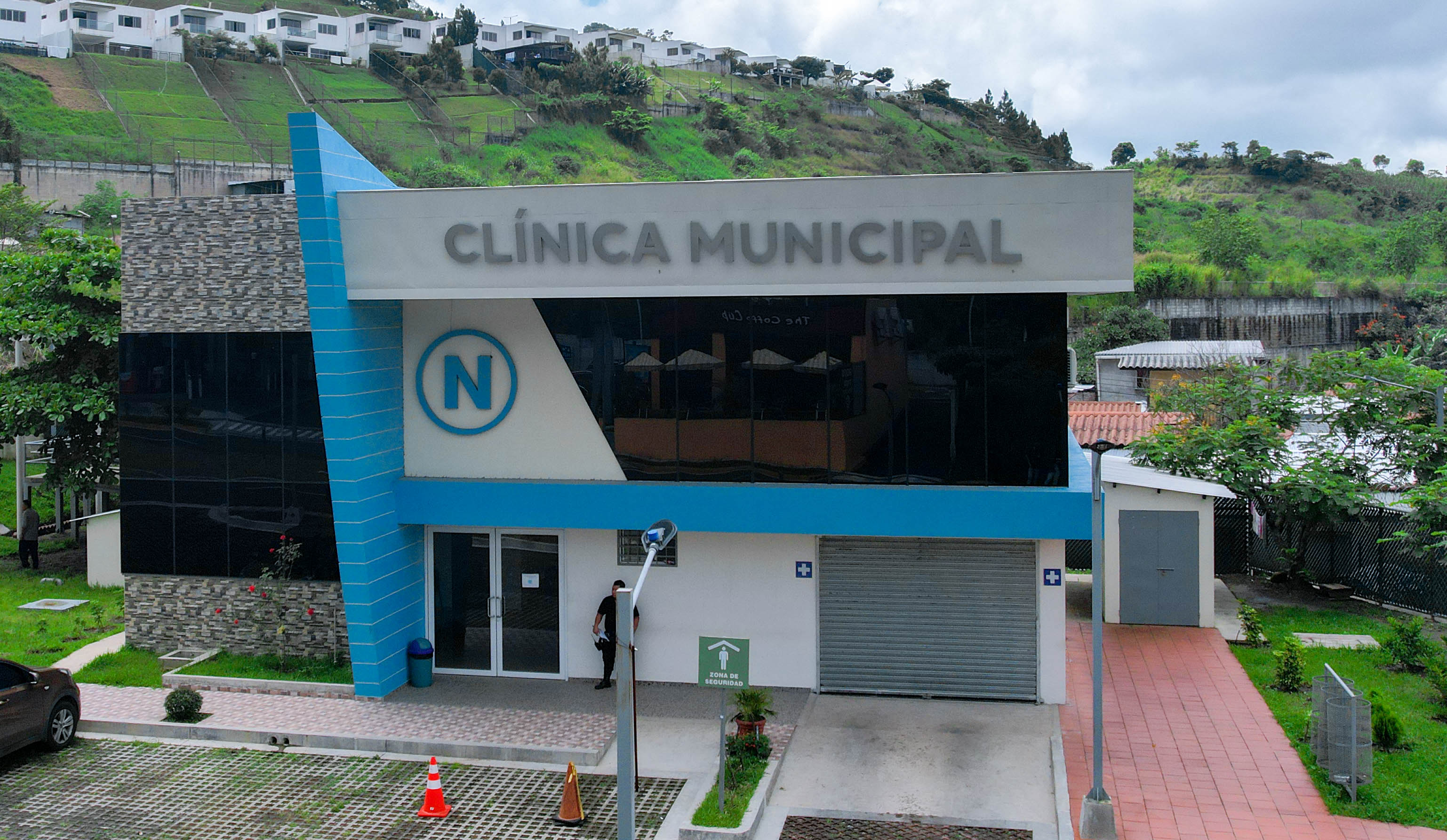

Nuevo Cuscatlán has a Health Unit attached to the Ministry of Health and a Municipal Clinic that provides services such as minor surgery, cytology, and minor procedures. Currently, the Municipal Clinic has two levels to provide support to the health of the inhabitants, the construction located on a land of 3,071.51 square meters, had an investment that amounted to $394,967.51.

== Religion ==
The town has only two Catholic churches, the San Juan de la Cruz parish and the San José parish; also has four evangelical churches, the New Cuscatlán Christian Church, the Kemuel Church, the New Cuscatlán Church of Tabernáculo Bíblico Bautista Amigos de Israel.

== Sport ==
The city has various scenarios for the practice of sport. The main one is the Nuevo Cuscatlán Stadium, other venues are the Florencia field, La Joya field and Santa Elena sportcenter. Nuevo Cuscatlán is home to the privately owned BeSport sport complex, which offers swimming pool, soccer field, paddle field, basketball and cricket.

== Etymology ==
The toponymic Cuzcatlán means in the Nahuatl language: "country of medals" or "city-jewel", since it comes from "Cuzcat", jewel, necklace account, wealth, medal, and "Tan or Tlan", locative suffix.}

== Nuevo Cuscatlan gallery ==
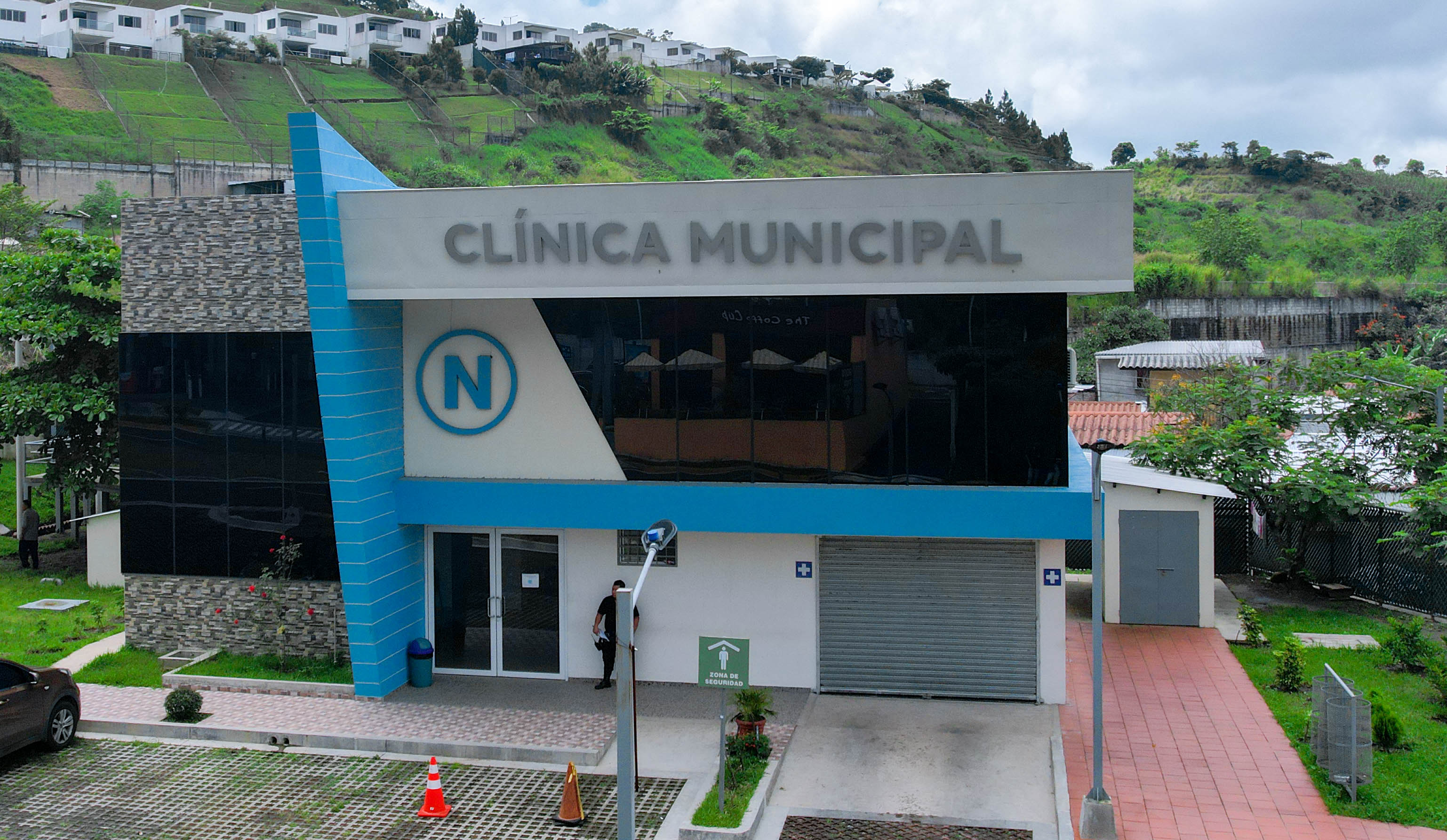
Public hospital of Nuevo Cuscatlan

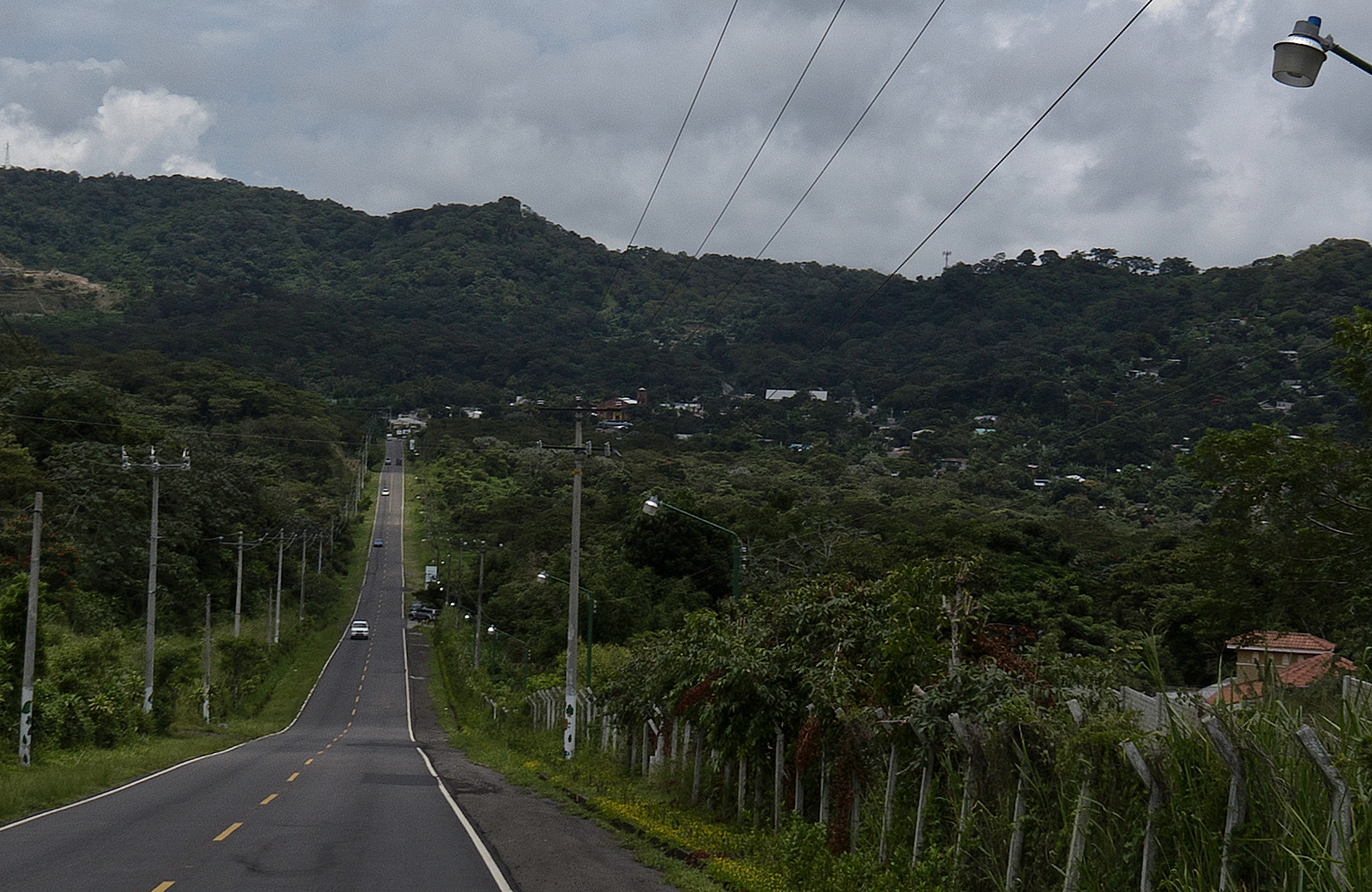
Road to Nuevo Cuscatlan

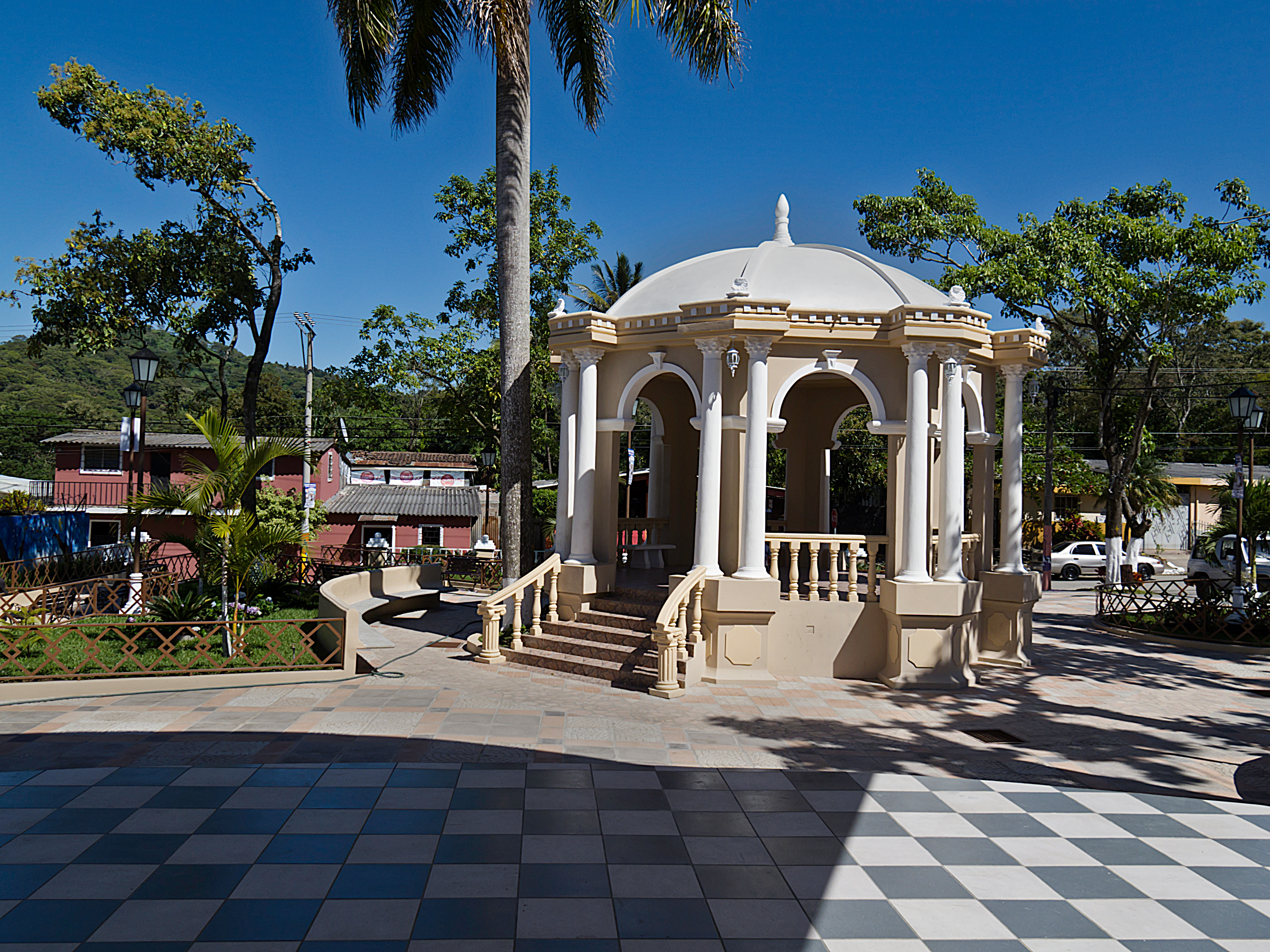
Nuevo Cuscatlán Central Park

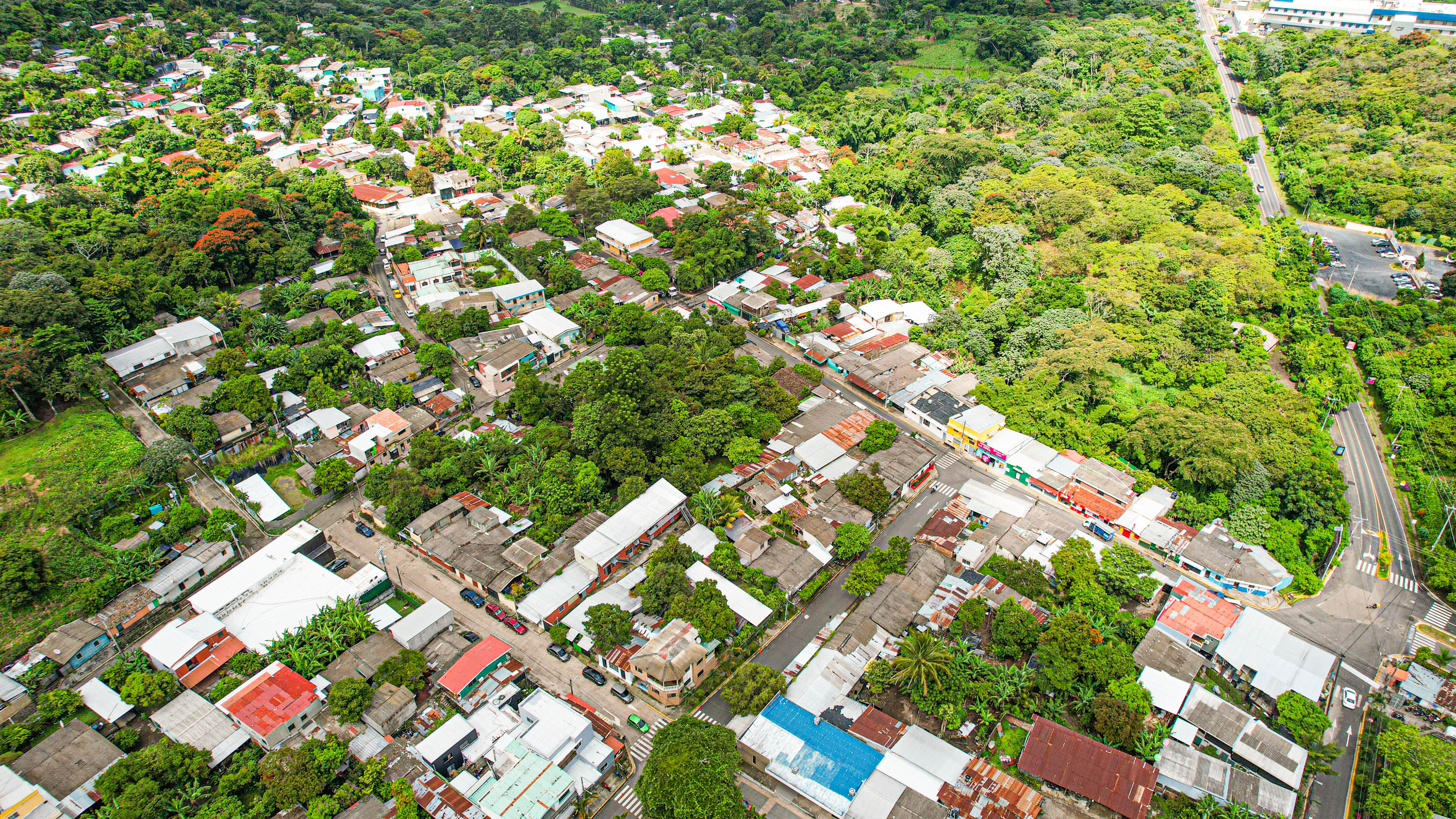
Nuevo Cuscatlan Downtown

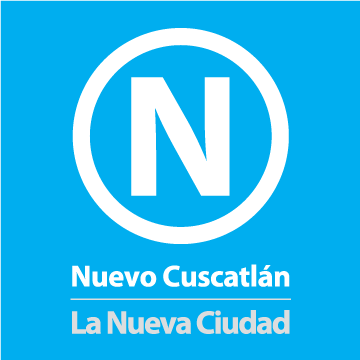
Nuevo Cuscatlan logo

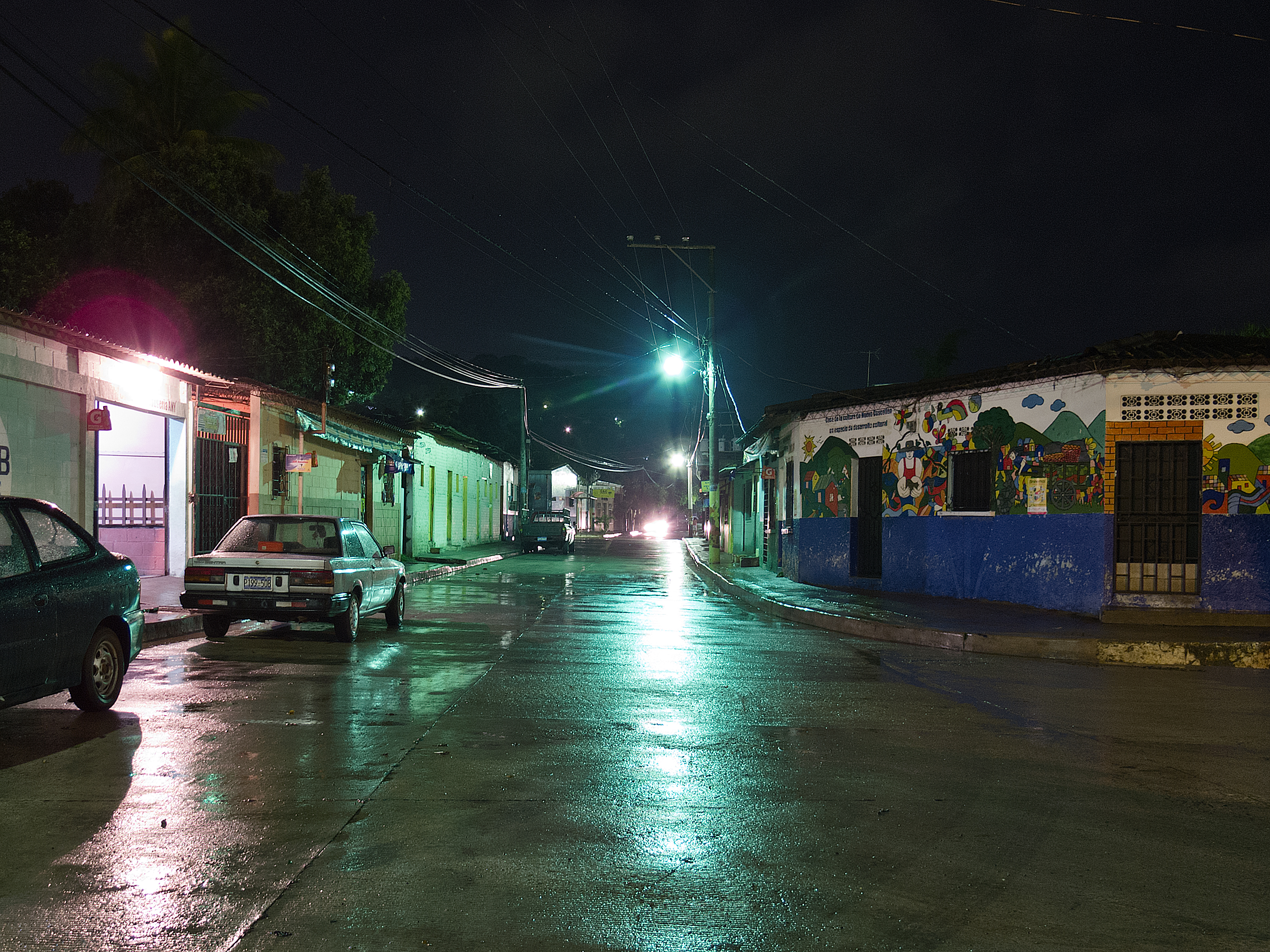
Nuevo Cuscatlan main street during night
