= Central American University =

Central American University may refer to:

- Central American University, Managua
- Central American University, San Salvador
- Autonomous University of Central America, located in Costa Rica
