= San Miguel Tepezontes =

- Municipality
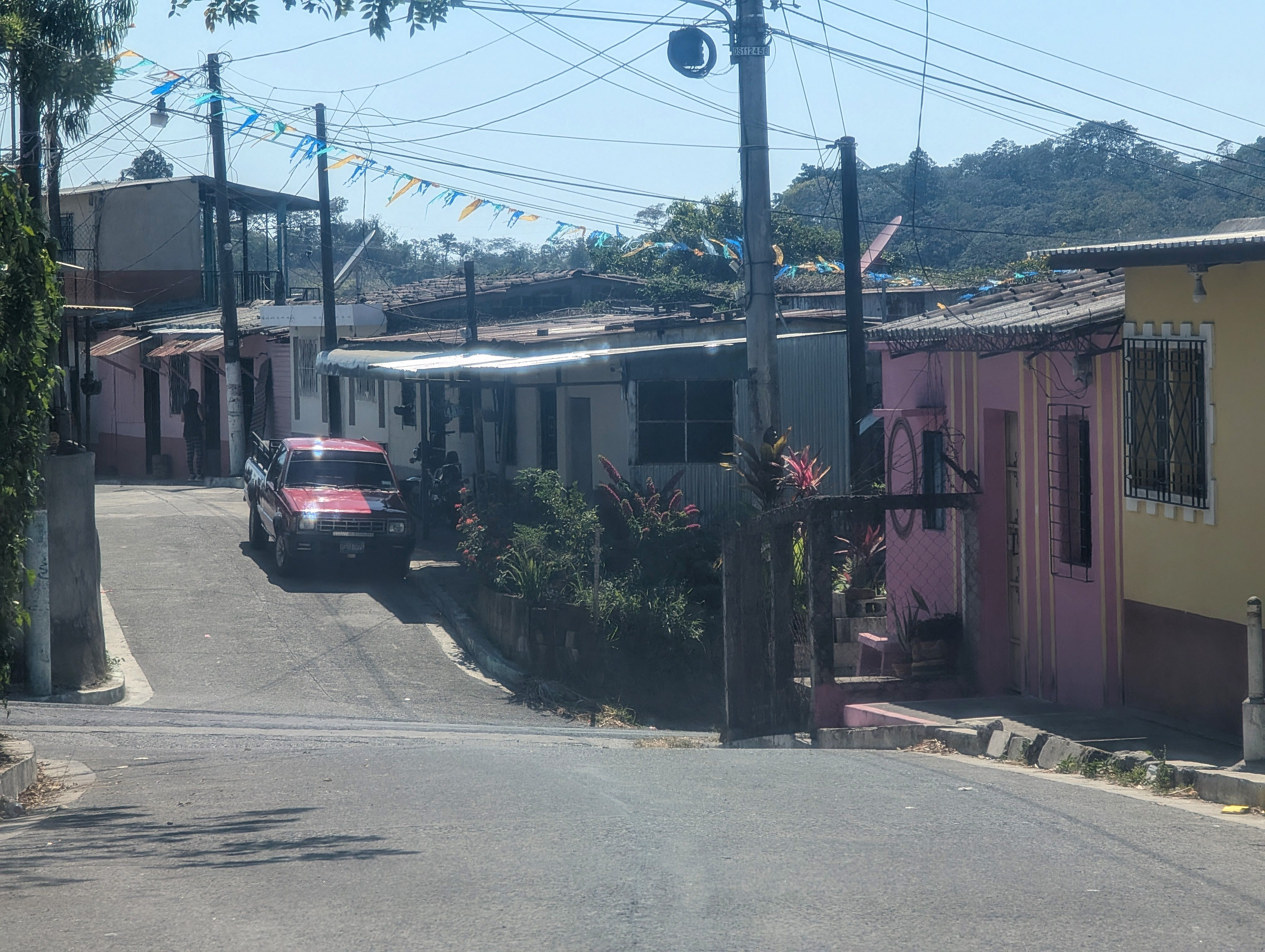
- San Miguel Tepezontes in 2026

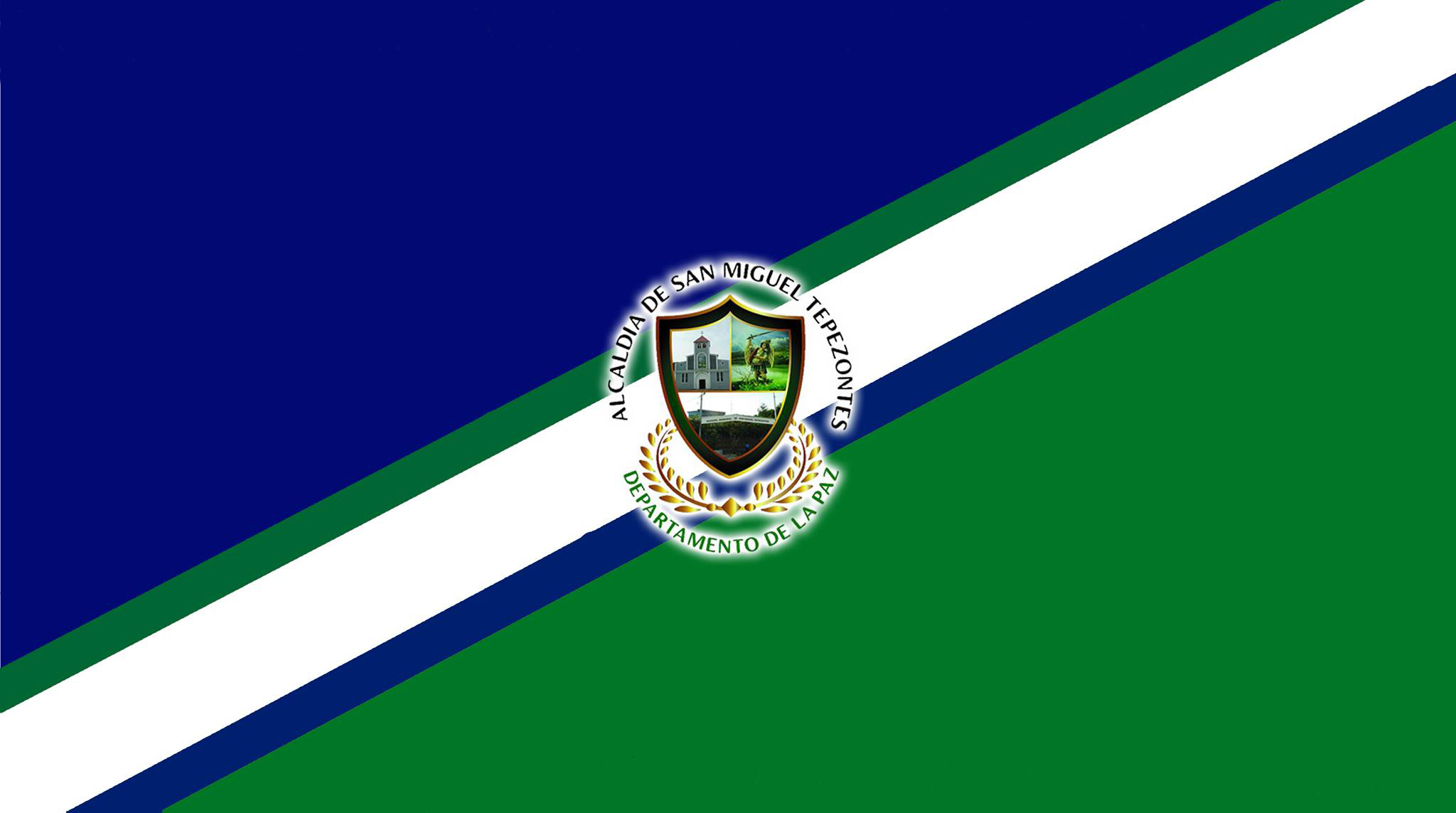
- Flag

- Location in El Salvador
- Coordinates: 13°37′N 89°1′W
- Country: El Salvador
- Department: La Paz
- Elevation: 2,484 ft (757 m)

Population
  - Total: 8,000

San Miguel Tepezontes is a municipality in the La Paz department of El Salvador. It is located in the countryside 25 minutes east of the capital city, San Salvador, and 40 minutes from the International Airport at Comalapa. It overlooks multiple natural tourist attractions, such as Lake Ilopango. The municipality has a population of more than 8,000 people, and is a producer of coffee, corn, beans and tropical fruit. The indigenous peoples are of Nahua origin.
