= Olocuilta =

- Municipality
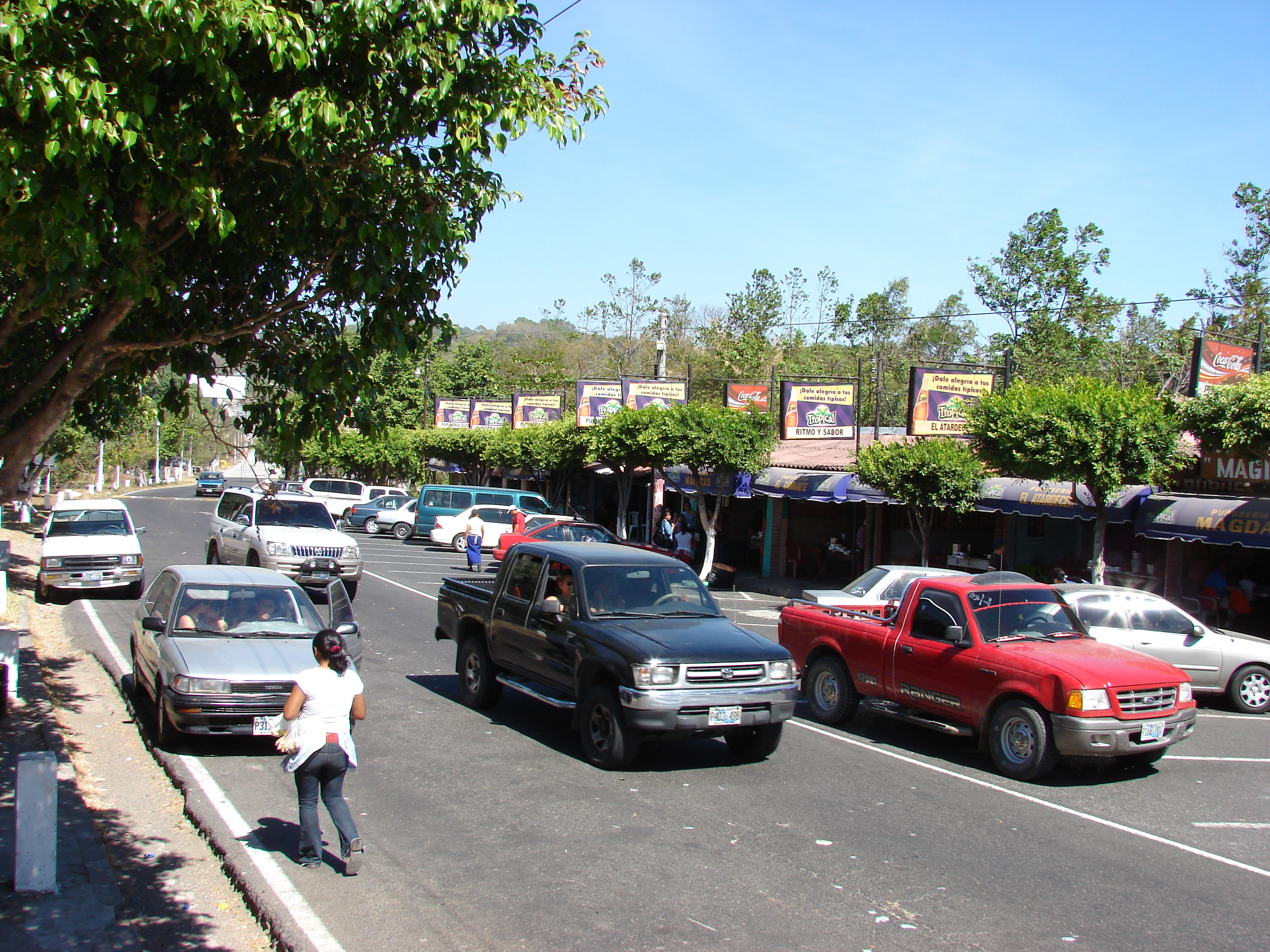

- Location in El Salvador
- Coordinates: 13°34′N 89°7′W
- Country: El Salvador
- Department: La Paz
- Elevation: 1,427 ft (435 m)

Population (2007)
  - Total: 29,529

Olocuilta is a municipality in the La Paz department of El Salvador, just a few kilometers down the highway from Santo Tomás. This town is well known for rice flour pupusas. Since it is on the main highway which connects San Salvador with the airport and the other main highway, which goes along the shore, (carretera litoral), it is a popular spot for pupusas, and there are some pupuserias which are open 24 hours. In some of the pupuserias, it is possible to get them made with corn flour instead.
