= Colón, El Salvador =

Colón, La Libertad
- District
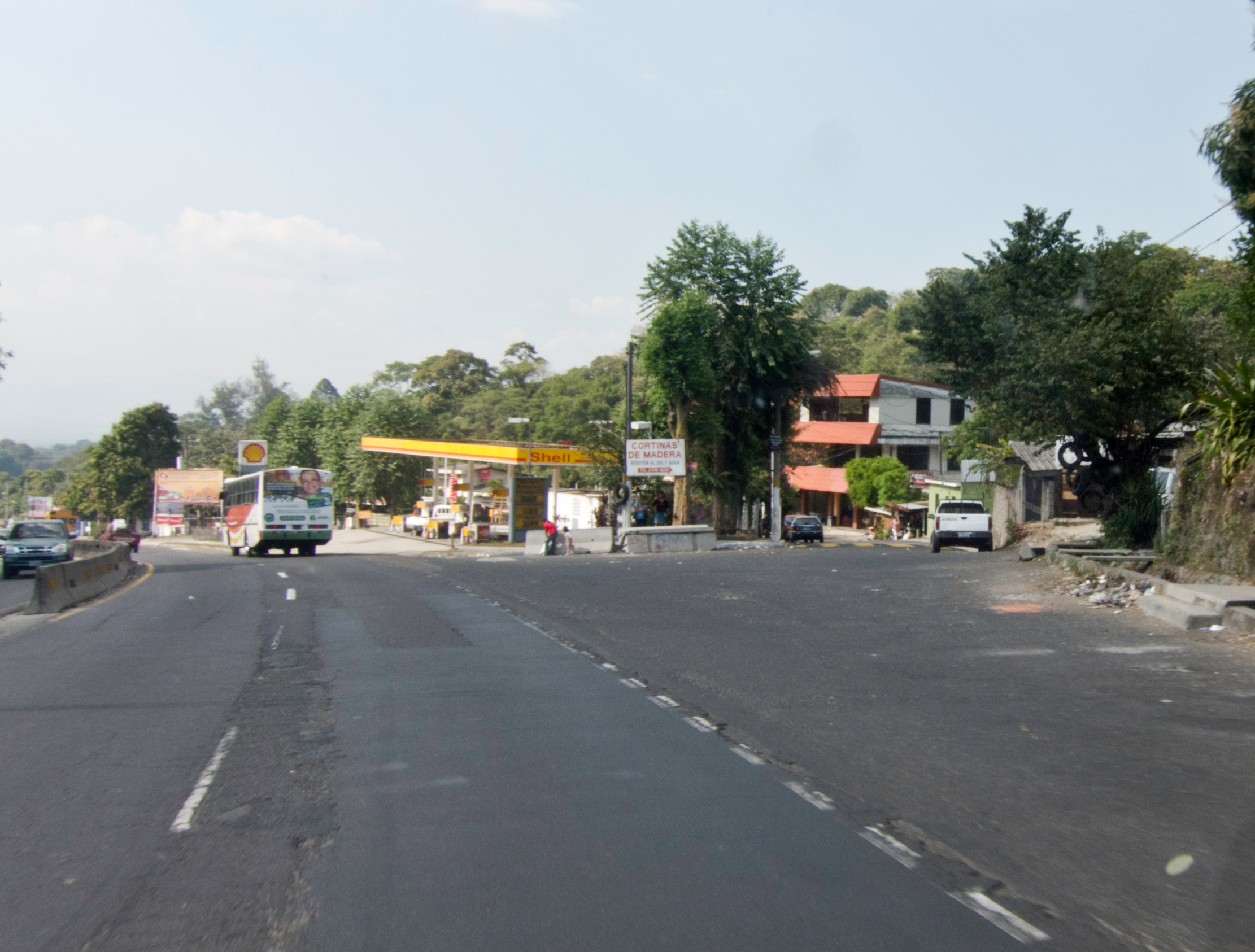
- The entrance to Colón via the Pan-American Highway

- Location in El Salvador
- Coordinates: 13°43′N 89°22′W
- Country: El Salvador
- Department: La Libertad

Area
  - District: 32.45 sq mi (84.05 km^{2})
- Elevation: 1,870 ft (570 m)

Population (2024)
  - District: 130,513
  - Estimate (2026): 122,944
  - Rank: 6th in El Salvador
  - Urban: 127,722
  - Rural: 2,791
- Time zone: UTC-6 (CST)

Colón is a municipality in the La Libertad department of El Salvador, bordering Santa Tecla, San Juan Opico, Ciudad Arce and Sacacoyo y Talnique. It was previously known as El Guarumal, made a town on 20 August 1886 and a villa on 24 July 1986.

== Cantons ==
The District of Colón is made up of the central neighborhood in Ciudad Colón and several cantons:

- El Botoncillal
- El Cobanal
- Cuyagualo
- El Capulín
- El Limón
- El Manguito
- Entre Ríos
- Hacienda Nueva
- Las Angosturas
- Las Brisas
- Las Moras
- Lourdes

== Gallery ==
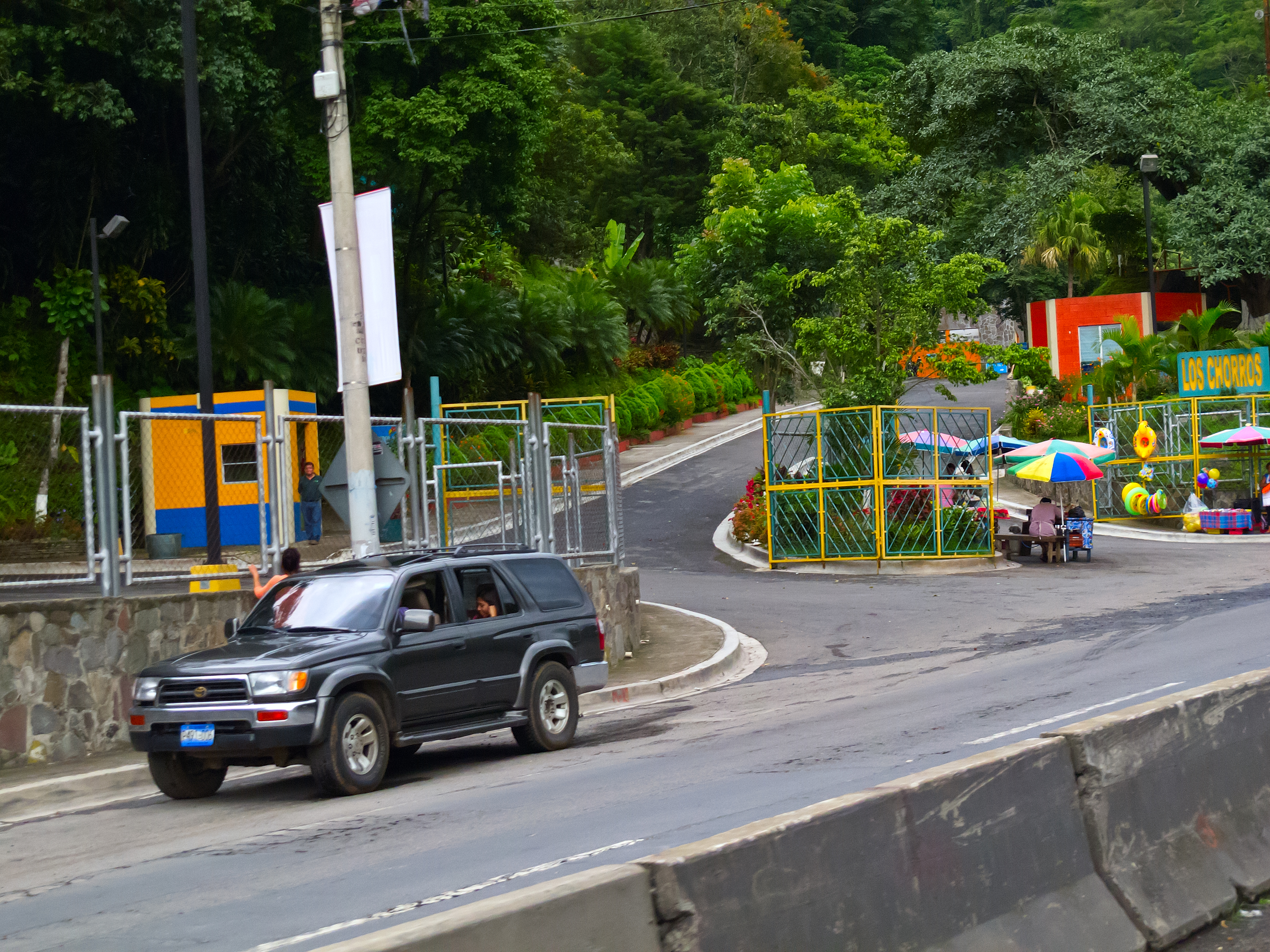
Entrance to Los Chorros

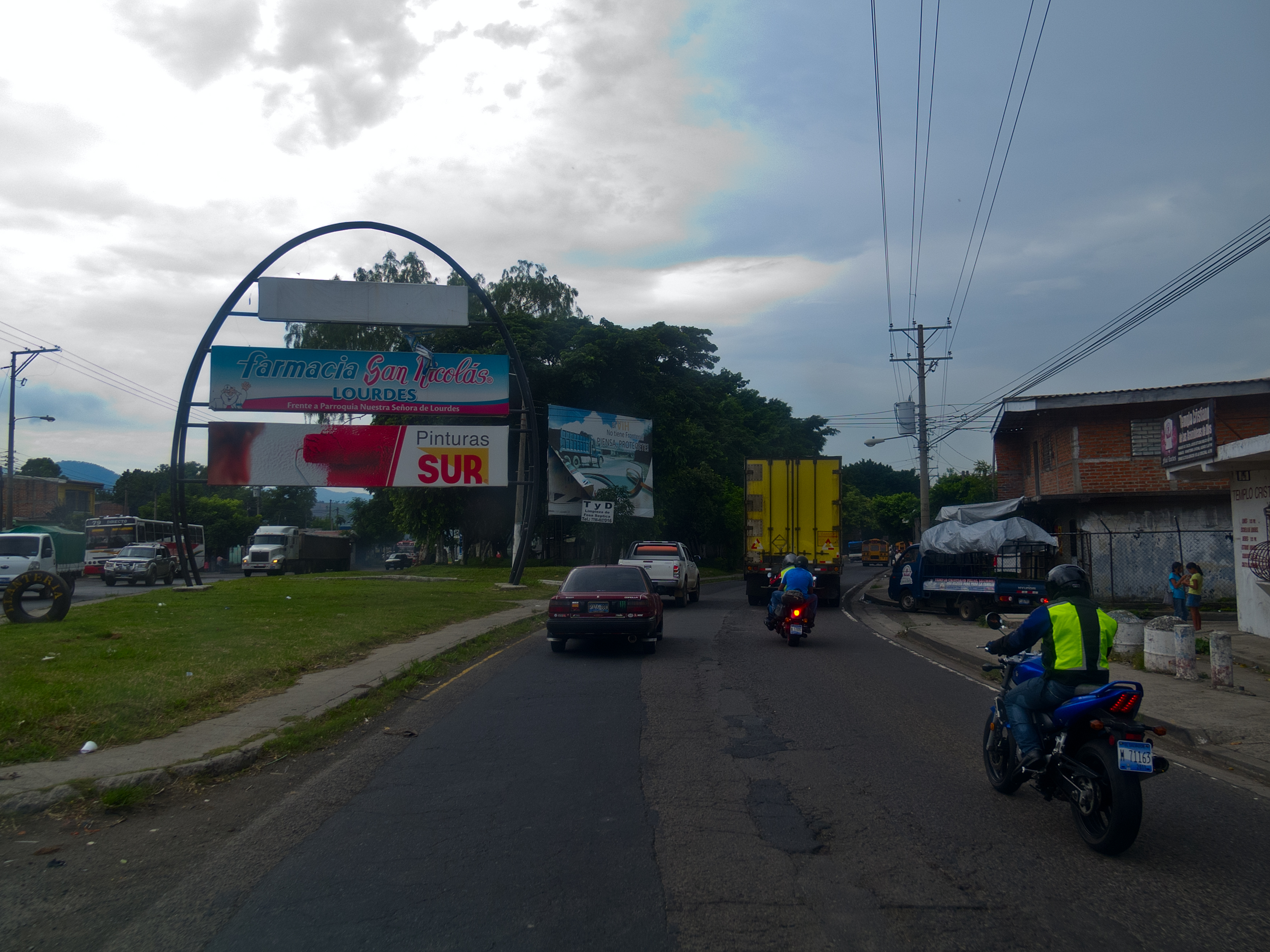
The Canton of Lourdes
