= Huizúcar =

Huizúcar Villa de Huizúcar
- District
- Location in El Salvador
- Coordinates: 13°35′N 89°14′W
- Country: El Salvador
- Department: La Libertad
- Municipality: La Libertad Este
- Determined as District: 1 May 2024

Government
  - Type: Mayor - Council Government
  - Mayor: Milagro Navas (as Mayor of La Libertad Este)(Alianza Republicana Nacionalista)
  - Council members: Edwin Gilberto Orellana; Rafael Hernandez Dale; Claudia Cristina Ventura; Anna Maria Copien; Juan Jose Alas Castillo; Francisco Antonio Castellón; Carlos Humberto Mendoza; Yolanda Concepción Peña; Elizabeth Andrade de Jovel
- Elevation: 2,000 ft (610 m)

Population (2024)
  - District: 12,287
  - Estimate (2026): 16,898
  - Rank: 115th in El Salvador
  - Urban: 7,196
  - Rural: 5,091

Huizúcar is a municipality in the city of La Libertad in El Salvador. The town of Huizúcar is the head of the Huizúcar district in the city of La Libertad. This town is 23 kilometers (14 miles) away from San Salvador and has an elevation of 640 meters (2,100 feet) above sea level. The patron saint of the town is Saint Michael the Archangel.

== Church of Huizúcar ==
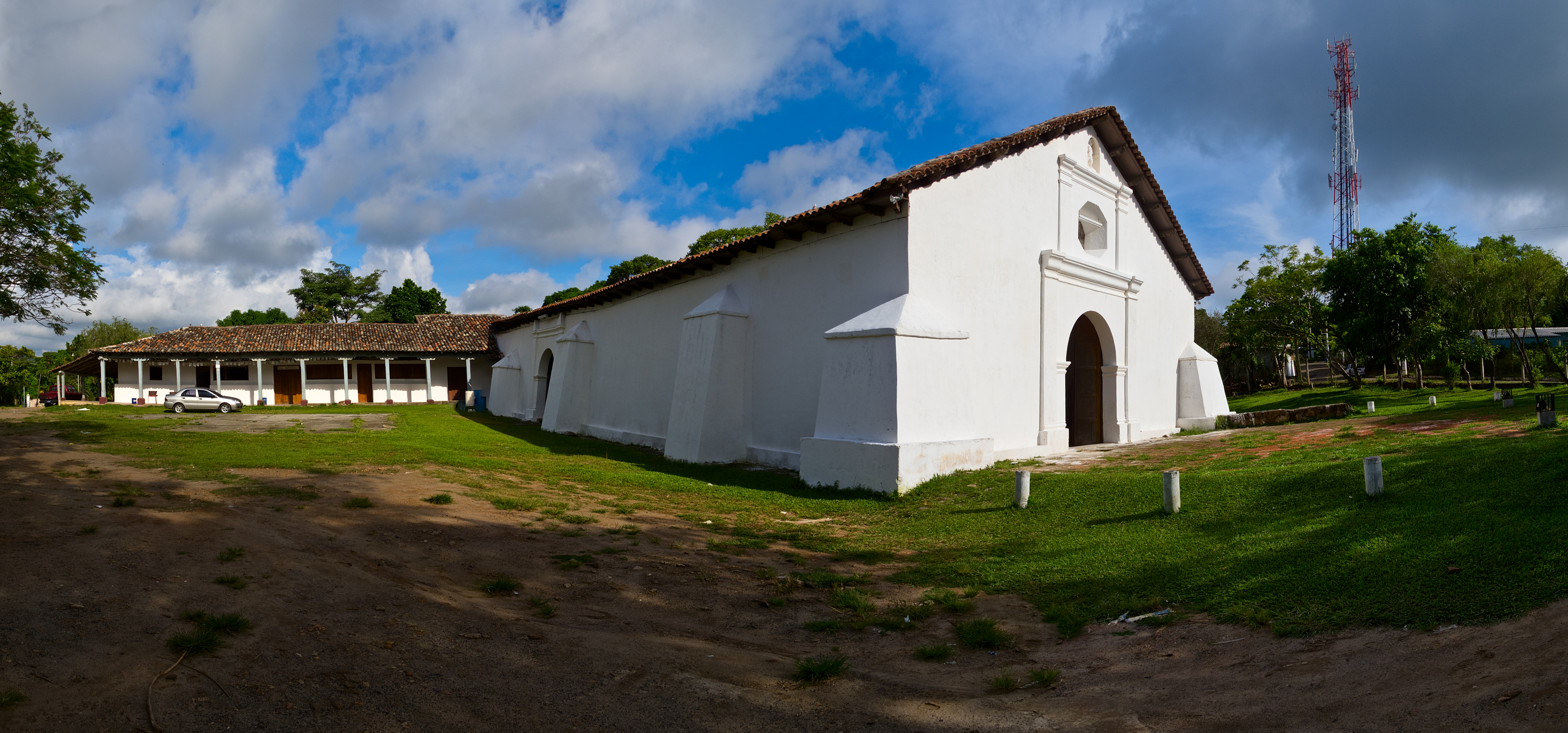
The Catholic Church in Huizucar

The Church of Huizúcar is a colonial style church that was built in 1740. Although the builder remains unknown, many believe that the plan of the church was designed by Friar Martín de Jesús.

The Church features notable architectural characteristics including the Mudejar style present in the beams and ceilings. It is built entirely from wood, with a skeleton of even roofs and large beams resting on thick wooden pillars with bases of molded brick.

The facade is composed of a single body, and presents a triangular forehead on the roof that is covered with molded figures. The facade features a niche with the image of Saint Michael the Archangel, made of masonry and embedded in the wall.

Its interior is of three simple naves separated by 18 columns. The walls are approximately 1.4 meters thick, and are made of adobes, which are bricks made from clay. The presbytery rectangular and its cover is a dome of coffered Mudejar type. An arch with vegetation design separates the presbytery from the ship.

The altarpieces are carved in wood, and they conserve vestiges of bread of gold of their Baroque style. It has images, pictorial works, and altars in Baroque style.

The last time the church was remodeled was in 1974. When the restoration began, the building was in a state of advanced deterioration. It was noticed that its structures and covers had been heavily damaged by humidity, termites, and other causes. The wooden structures, particularly of the roof, were semi-destroyed. The walls contained long and deep cracks, which had widened as a result of water leakage and tremors.

The main facade was obstructed completely by a recently constructed piazza and a tower. The tower, placed on the left corner buttress, was partially destroyed because it had been lifted to serve as a steeple.

The primary purpose of the restoration was to liberate the original construction from the piazza and the steeple, which lacked historical value.

Most components of the ceiling, like props, feathers, beams, and others were replaced, and the coffers of Mudejar style were armed again. The walls were repaired, stuffing the cracks and holes, as well as the buttresses, three of which were reconstructed totally. All the walls were sealed and whitened with lime.

The foundation of the village came long before the colony. Its autochthonous name means: "Place on the way of the thorns." In the report of Monsignor Pedro Cortez and Larraz of the year 1770, Huizúcar was a small town annex to the rectory of San Jacinto, where 200 families lived.

There is also data of San Salvador Mayor, Don Manuel de Gálvez Corral that says that in 1740, it had 220 tributary-Indians or heads of household (that is to say, about 1100 inhabitants). The Patron Festivity takes place on September 29 in honor of San Miguel Archangel.

== Gallery ==
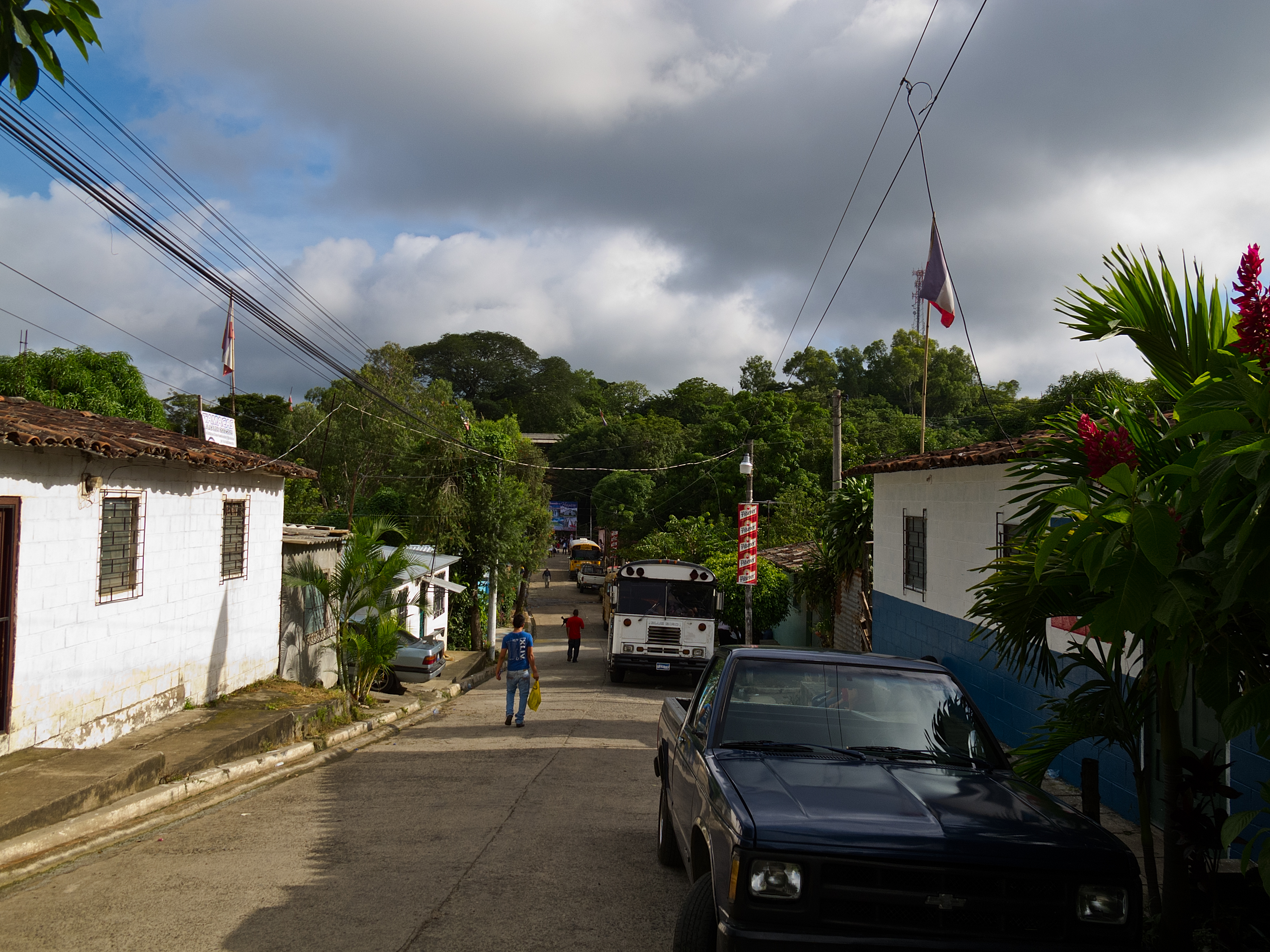
Streets of Huizúcar, looking south

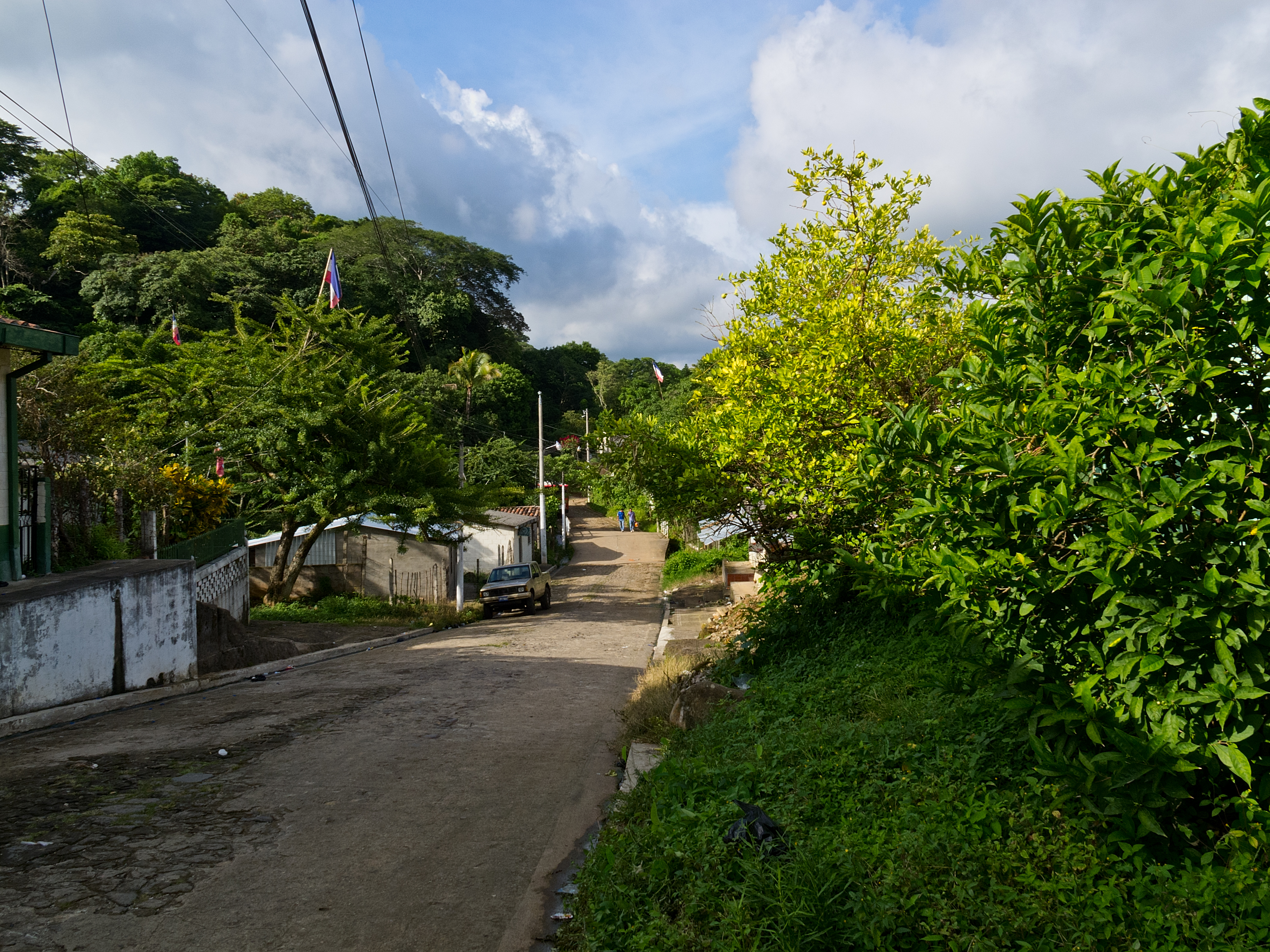
Looking to the north

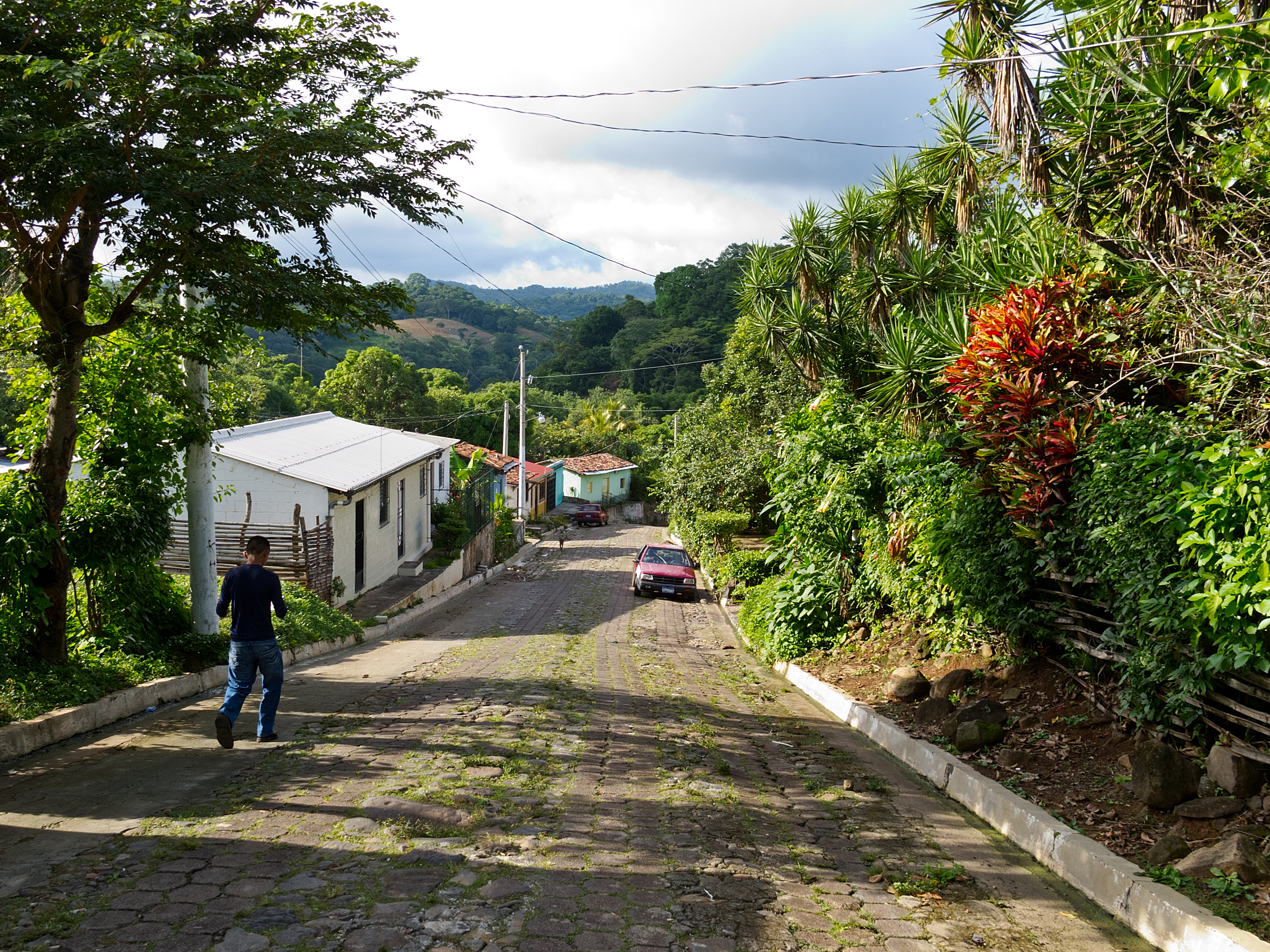
Streets of Huizúcar

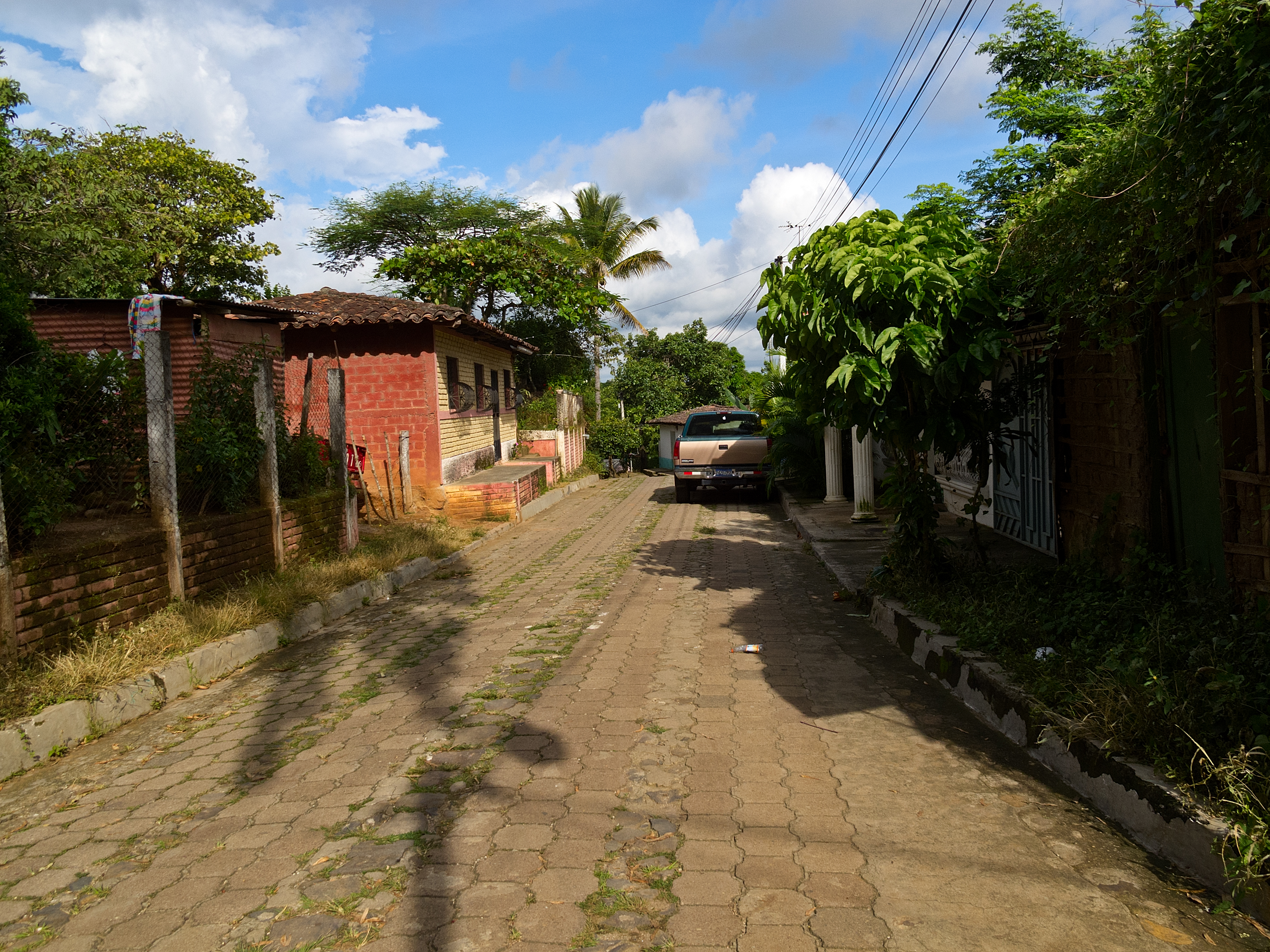
Looking to the east
