= San Juan Tepezontes =

- District
- Location in El Salvador
- Coordinates: 13°37′N 89°1′W
- Country: El Salvador
- Department: La Paz
- Elevation: 2,372 ft (723 m)

Population (2024)
  - District: 3,758
  - Rank: 219th in El Salvador
  - Urban: 1,870
  - Rural: 1,888

San Juan Tepezontes is a municipality in the La Paz department of El Salvador. Its name is a Hispanicization of a Nawat term meaning "many hills". It was incorporated in 1945. Its population as of 2004 was 3,269.

The town was severely damaged by earthquakes in 1857 and twice again in January 2001 and in February 2001.
