= La Paz Department (El Salvador) =

Department of El Salvador

La Paz
- Department
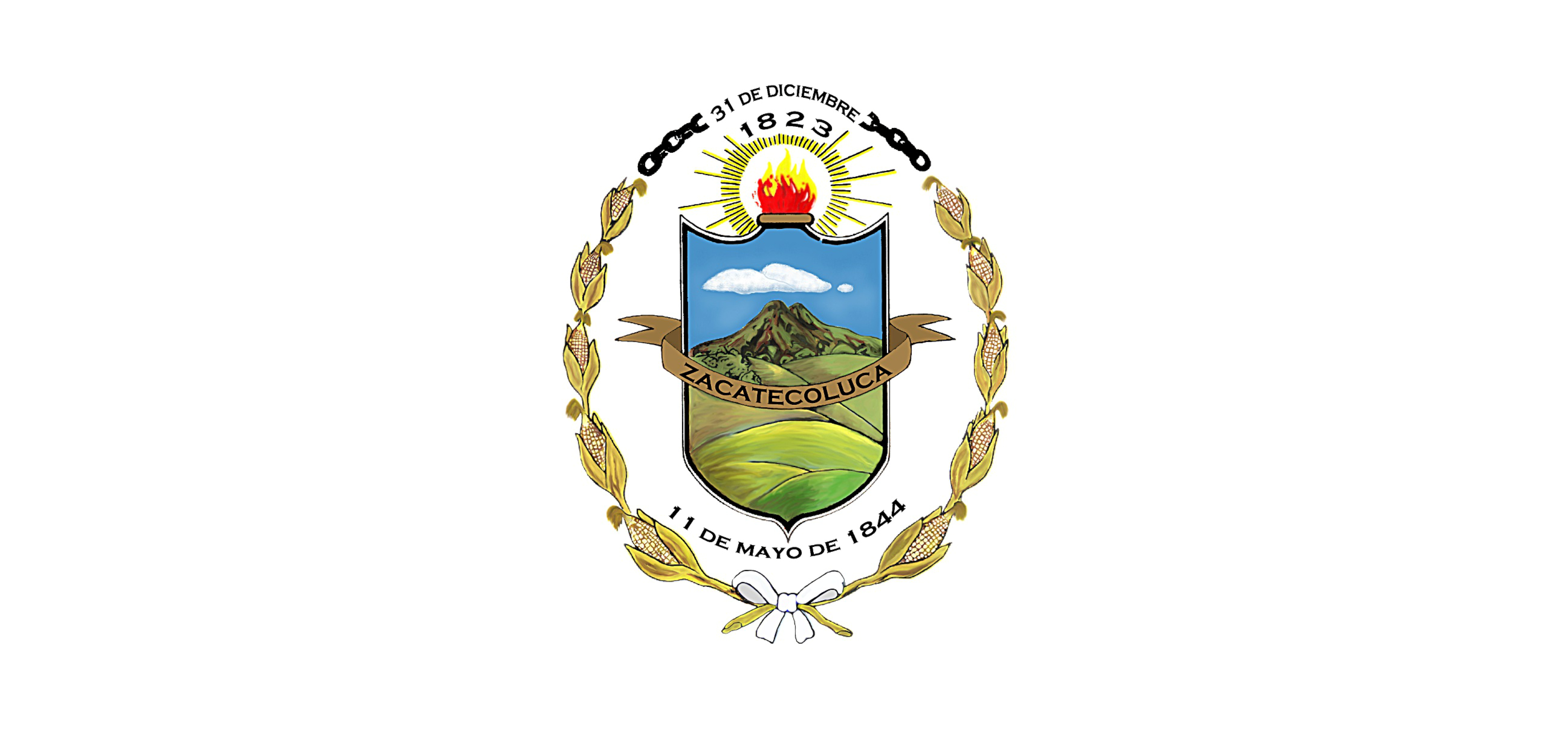
- Flag

- Location within El Salvador
- Coordinates: 13°29′02″N 88°57′32″W
- Country: El Salvador
- Created (given current status): February 1852
- Seat: Zacatecoluca

Area
  - Total: 1,227.6 km^{2} (474.0 sq mi)
  - Rank: Ranked 9th

Population (2024)
  - Total: 318,374
  - Rank: Ranked 10th
  - Density: 259.35/km^{2} (671.70/sq mi)
- Time zone: UTC−6 (CST)
- ISO 3166 code: SV-PA

La Paz (Spanish pronunciation: [la pas]) is a department of El Salvador in the south central area of the country. The capital is Zacatecoluca. La Paz has an area of 1,228 km^{2}. The department was created in 1852. There are various caves containing rock writing. The department has a church in Zacatecoluca where the Independence Hero Dr Jose Simeon Cañas y Villacorta was born. He was known as "The Liberator of the Slaves in Central America". In 1833, Anastasio Aquino, an indigenous person, proclaimed himself as "The Emperor of the Nonualcos".

== Municipalities ==
1. La Paz Centro
2. La Paz Este
3. La Paz Oeste

== Districts ==
1. Cuyultitán
2. El Rosario
3. Jerusalén
4. Mercedes La Ceiba
5. Olocuilta
6. Paraíso de Osorio
7. San Antonio Masahuat
8. San Emigdio
9. San Francisco Chinameca
10. San Juan Nonualco
11. San Juan Talpa
12. San Juan Tepezontes
13. San Luis La Herradura
14. San Luis Talpa
15. San Miguel Tepezontes
16. San Pedro Masahuat
17. San Pedro Nonualco
18. San Rafael Obrajuelo
19. Santa María Ostuma
20. Santiago Nonualco
21. Tapalhuaca
22. Zacatecoluca

== Geography ==
Bosque Santa Clara is a coastal forest of the La Paz Department, to the east of the town of Playa El Pimental.

== Dance and traditions ==
This department is one of the oldest in the country; hence it adopted many of ancestral customs and dances including "The Tiger and the Deer", "The Ascension Bulls", "The Levers of Santa Cruz", and others.

The dance of The Tiger and the Deer goes back to 1868, when San Juan Nonualco was inhabited by natives that lived off the hunting of deer that were plentiful in the area. However, there was a tiger that devoured the animals. The dance presents the story of a married couple that left to hunt the tiger; however, he was attacked by the animal and he had to request aid to some timber men that were close and to beg to the Señor de la Caridad, protector of the municipality, to save them of the danger. The hunters killed the tiger. The dance is carried out in the party of May 2. It consists of four characters: "the old ones" that represent the couple that go with the shotgun and the bow; the tiger and the Lord of the drum that mark the steps of the dance. The spectators watch when the tiger attacks the old ones, but these behead it. The most amusing part is the "repartition" of the portions of the animal, which is called "behead the priest", "the forehead for Vicente", "the head for Teresa"... until all the residents are beheaded.

The Ascension Bulls tradition belongs to San Juan Nonualco. It speaks of a character called Isidro Labrador. They tell that on Thursday of Ascension, the day that celebrates Christ's ascent to Heaven, Isidro began to work the field and when he arrived to the oxen, he heard one of them say: "Isidro, today we won't work". He fell on his knees, begging forgiveness to God for not having remembered the date. Based on this event, the celebration is kept on Thursday of Ascension like the day dedicated to the bulls. In the six neighborhoods of San Juan Nonualco, the inhabitants manufacture a bull that they walk through the streets. The hermitages are adorned with altars and the Rosario is prayed. When concluding the prayer, the competition or fights of the bulls begin.

=== Food traditions ===
Among the typical food that you can find there is the atol, made from cashews. This atol has been done in the same manner, transmitted from generation to generation, for about 20 years. Some common dishes include pupusas, empanadas de leche or frijoles (banana on the outside and inside is pureed milk or beans).
