= San Juan Nonualco =

- Municipality
- Location in El Salvador
- Coordinates: 13°30′26″N 88°53′59″W
- Country: El Salvador
- Department: La Paz

Government
  - Mayor: José Guillermo Rodas Ramos

Area
  - Total: 25.29 sq mi (65.49 km^{2})
- Elevation: 620 ft (190 m)

Population (2016)
  - Total: 19 336

San Juan Nonualco is a municipality in the La Paz department of El Salvador. According to the official census of 2007, it has a population of 17,256 inhabitants, although for the year 2016 it is estimated that 19,336 inhabitants live in the city.
