= Milagro Navas =

Salvadoran politician

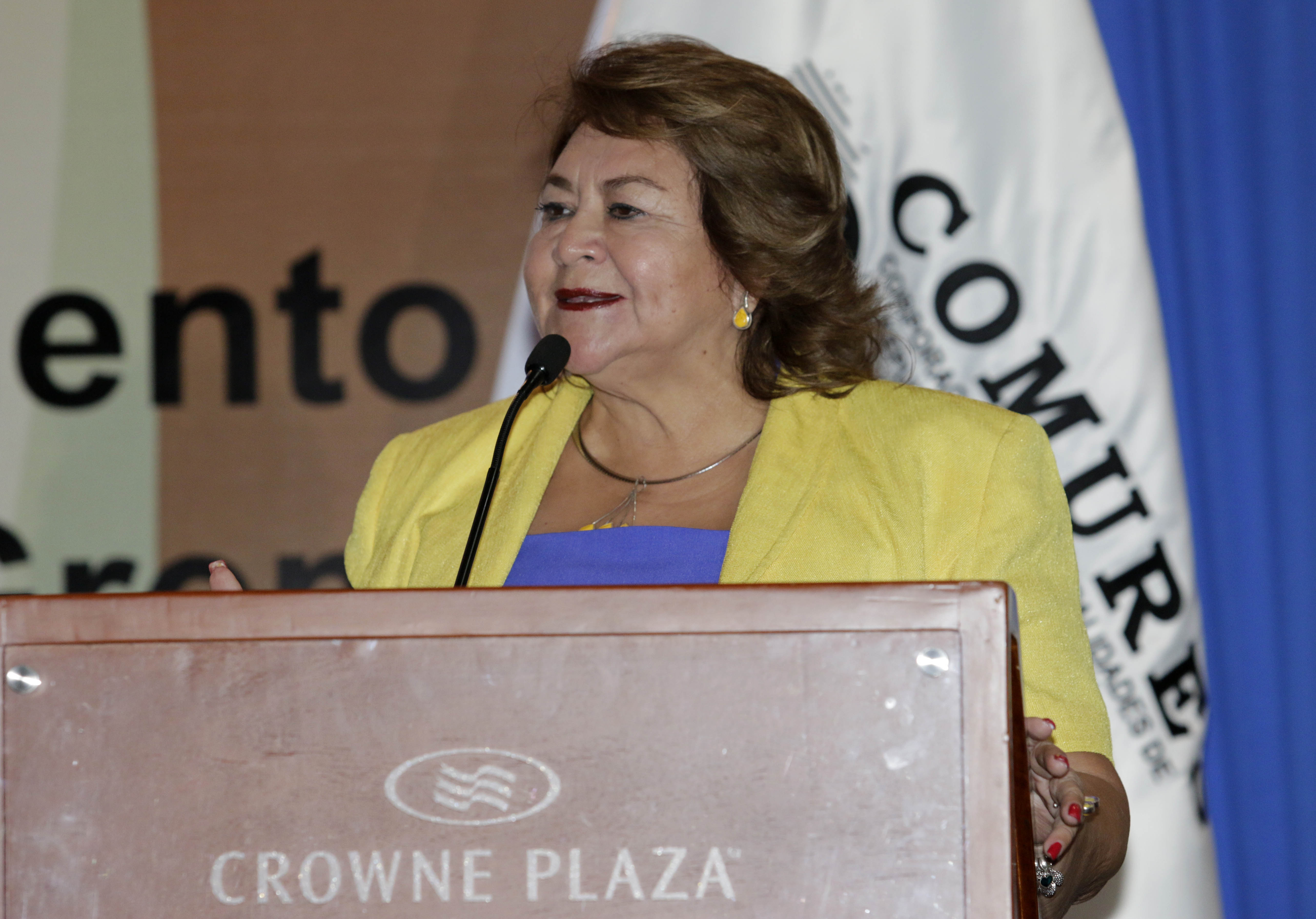
- Navas in 2015

1st Mayor of La Libertad Este
- Incumbent
- Assumed office 1 May 2024
- Preceded by: Herself (as Mayor of Antiguo Cuscatlán)

Mayor of Antiguo Cuscatlán
- In office 1 May 1988 – 1 May 2024
- Preceded by: Ángela Reinosa
- Succeeded by: Herself (as Mayor of La Libertad Este)

Personal details
- Born: Zoila Milagro Navas Quintanilla; 22 July 1952 (age 74) Antiguo Cuscatlán, El Salvador
- Party: Nationalist Republican Alliance
- Parent(s): Héctor Navas and Esperanza Herrera
- Education: University of Nueva San Salvador; Central American University
- Occupation: Politician

Zoila Milagro Navas Quintanilla (born 22 July 1952) is a Salvadoran politician who has served as Mayor of La Libertad Este since 2024. She previously served as mayor of Antiguo Cuscatlán from 1988 to 2024. She is a member of the Nationalist Republican Alliance.

== Biography ==
Zoila Milagro Navas Quintanilla was born on 22 July 1952 in Antiguo Cuscatlán, El Salvador. Her parents were Héctor Navas and Esperanza Herrera. She attended the Hermanas Somascas Institute and later the Nuestra Señora de Fátima College. She graduated from the University of Nueva San Salvador with a degree in public relations and publication. She also later attended the Central American University.

Navas became the mayor of Antiguo Cuscatlán in 1988 as a member of the Nationalist Republican Alliance (ARENA). She has stated that ARENA founder Roberto d'Aubuisson was her mentor. Navas won re-election in every subsequent election.

When the Salvadoran government consolidated El Salvador's 262 municipalities down to 44, Navas ran for mayor of La Libertad Este in 2024. She won the election, defeating Nuevas Ideas candidate Michelle Sol. Navas was ARENA's only municipal candidate to win their election and she became the only opposition-aligned mayor. In February 2026, Navas announced she was running for re-election in 2027.
