= San Pedro Nonualco =

- District
- Location in El Salvador
- Coordinates: 13°36′N 88°56′W
- Country: El Salvador
- Department: La Paz
- Town: La Paz Centro

Government
  - District Director: José López

Area
  - Total: 10.6 sq mi (27.5 km^{2})
- Elevation: 1,955 ft (596 m)

Population (2024)
  - Total: 12,000

San Pedro Nonualco is a District in the La Paz department of El Salvador. It is located in the paracentral region of the country, near the banks of the Jiboa River. The district has a territorial area of 27.5 km² and a population of 12,000 inhabitants (according to government statistics). The municipality includes an urban area divided into 6 neighborhoods, as well as 7 rural cantons.

The main economic activities of the population are the cultivation of oranges, lemons and musaceae, as well as basic grains such as corn and beans; in addition to various tropical fruits and livestock raising. Its largest economic sector is concentrated in services and growing retail trade. A part of the population migrates frequently, forming a diaspora abroad that resides mainly in the United States of America.

Its boundary points are: to the North by the District of Santa María Ostuma, to the South by the District of Santiago Nonualco, to the East by the District of Guadalupe (in the department of San Vicente) and San Santiago Nonualco, and to the west by the Districts of San Juan Tepezontes and San Miguel Tepezontes, with the natural limit of the Jíboa River.

The epicenter of the earthquake recorded on February 13, 2001 took place in this District, which left a large part of the architectural vestiges of the urban area destroyed.

This District celebrates two festivals throughout the year, the first are celebrated between February 4 and 5 in honor of the Sweet Name of Jesus and between June 28 and 29 the patron saint festivals are celebrated in honor of the patron Saint Peter the Apostle.

== Political and administrative division ==
Neighborhoods: El Centro. El Calvario. San Francisco. San José. Guadalupe. Concepción.

Cantons: La Hacienda Vieja. San Juan Nahuistepeque. San Ramón. El Lazareto. La Comunidad. El Roble. La Carbonera.

== Origins. ==
This very ancient pre-Columbian population was founded by Nahua people around the 11th or 12th century of the Christian Era. The Nonualcos tribe lived in the department of La Paz and in the southern part of the Department of San Vicente, between the Jiboa and Lempa rivers, its initial inhabitants being warriors. In the Nahuatl language, Nonualco means “Place of the dumb”, as it comes from “nonual” which means dumb and from “co”, a suffix for place.

== Colonial period. ==
At this time, around 1550, its greatest economic activity was the production of cocoa, with a population of 1,300 indigenous people. Below are some relevant data and dates in the History of San Pedro Nonualco:

1770: In this year it belonged to the Curate of Santiago Nonualco and had a population of 634 inhabitants, divided into 131 families.

1786: It was annexed to the district of Zacatecoluca, one of the most important in the municipality of San Salvador.

1807: The population was 526 people, ethnically divided as follows: 212 Indigenous and 314 Ladinos, which shows the progressive mixing of races of the settlers.

== Post-independence ==
1833: The children of this town supported the Insurrection of the indigenous leader Anastasio Aquino, who was later proclaimed emperor of the Nonualcos.

San Pedro Nonualco, along with the neighboring towns of the Nonualcos region, was the scene of the indigenous rebellion of Anastasio Aquino in the year 1833. In a report on material improvements in the department of La Paz made on January 16, 1854, Governor Eustaquio Guirola noted that in San Pedro Nonualco 93 yards of paving 3¼ yards wide were worked, a foundation was made next to it. south of the church, 45 yards long and 1½ yards wide, and 800 tiles were collected to repair the cemetery. In the report made on May 16, Governor José Rafael Molina took note that the cemetery had been repaired. and the roads of its jurisdiction.

Villa Title

The municipality obtained the title of Villa in February 1875.

City Title and District Headquarters

On April 10, 1912, the Legislative Assembly issued a decree by virtue of which the title of City was granted to the Villa de San Pedro Nonualco and it was established, at the same time, as the head of its own district; The decree was sanctioned by the government of President Manuel Enrique Araujo on April 13 of the same year. This new district, fourth and last in the department of La Paz, was constituted as follows: San Pedro Nonualco, Santa María Ostuma, Jerusalem and La Ceiba, dismembered from the district of Zacatecoluca; and Paraíso de Osorio and San Emigdio, dismembered from the district of San Pedro Masahuat.

== XXI century ==
As of 2024, it was granted the title of District, forming part of the municipality of La Paz Centro in the new administrative division approved by the Legislative Assembly where the municipalities are renamed districts and are reorganized into 44 municipalities established throughout the country. from El Salvador.

== Mayors ==
Period	Mayor
1946-1948	Jesús Encarnación Mejía
1948-1954	Lázaro López Sánchez
1954-1956	José Antonio Prieto Rivas
1956-1958	Ismael Valladares
1958-1960	Guadalupe Velasco Amaya
1960-1962	María Luisa Viuda de Orellana
1962-1963	Alberto Prieto Rivas
1963-1964	Eduardo Argueta Burgos
1964-1966	Tomás Fernando Gavidia
1966-1968	Julio César Navarrete
1968-1970	José Arístides Argueta
1971-1977	Lázaro López Sánchez
1977-1979	Jesús Rodríguez
1980-1984	Perfecto Ramos
1985-1988	Julio César Navarrete
1988-1991	Agapito Hernández Aquino
1991-1994	Rubén Alvarado Ventura
1994-2000	Raúl Mena Zepeda
2000-2006	Sergio Antonio Orellana
2006-2009	Luis Guillermo García
2009-2015	Sergio Antonio Orellana
2015-2019	José Alfredo Hernández Romero
2019-2021	Jaime Heriberto Leiva
2021-2024	Juan Pablo Pérez Bayona

== District Directors ==
Period	District Director
2024-2027	José López
