= German Salvadorans =

Total population
- 230,000

Regions with significant populations
- San Salvador, Santa Tecla, Antiguo Cuscatlan

Languages
- Salvadoran Spanish

Religion
- Christianity, minority Judaism

Related ethnic groups
- German people, White Salvadoran

A German Salvadorans are a Salvadorans descendant of German citizens who have adopted the two nationalities or Salvadorans who have German ancestry, there is a record of waves of German immigrants since the 19th century, later with the arrival of German refugees during the Second World War. El Salvador has important relations with Germany

== History ==
Starting in 1871, Salvadoran historiography speaks of a period of "liberal reforms", which brought a significant number of immigrants in the 19th century, however, the entry of immigrants was not taken seriously and the numbers not known. It was from 1900 when the immigrant population began to grow, mainly from Europe (including Germans) but also from Latin America and Asia

One of the most famous Germans who immigrated to El Salvador, was Walter Thilo Deininger, who settled in Cuscatlán in 1885. Who soon built his coffee estate and other industries. Besides a co-fraternity called (La cofradía de Don Balta), his neighbors had stated that the character of Walter was phlegmatic and good-natured. Soon more German families arrived to the Cuscatlán Department, as well as important people like Jürgen Hübner, a German historian and author of "Die Deutschen und El Salvador (The Germans and El Salvador). In the early twentieth century between 10 and 15 families immigrated, although the majority later left the country due to political problems.

In 1942, and in the context of the Jewish holocaust by Nazi Germany, several Ashkenazi Jews acquired Salvadoran nationality and moved to live in the country, thanks to the efforts of the diplomat José Castellanos Contreras, who saved 40,000 Jews from Central Europe, including the Germans.

== Relations between El Salvador and Germany ==
Germany is one of the main European trading partners of El Salvador and is the largest importer of Salvadoran coffee. The Chamber of Commerce German-Salvadoran consists of around 85 companies. The Central American integration process was Germany on June 27, 2008 extra-regional observer of the Central American Integration SICA located in San Salvador. In addition to a German school in San Salvador.

== Notable Salvadorans of German descent ==
- Walter Béneke
- Serafín Brennen, founder of the city of Berlin, El Salvador
- Isabel Dada Rinker, actress
- Rolando Déneke, Minister of Foreign Affairs 1960-61
- Reynaldo Galindo Pohl
- Andre R. Guttfreund, to date, the only Salvadoran to win an Oscar
- Daniel Guttfreund
- Celia Jokisch
- Friedrich Jokisch
- Roberto Kriete, German American father
- Enrique Kuny Mena
- Mia Lehrer
- Bernard Lewinsky
- Gustavo López Davidson
- José Antonio Morales Ehrlich, two time mayor of San Salvador 1974-1976, 1985-1988
- Andrea Müschenborn Charlaix, Nuestra Belleza Mundo 2004
- Carlos Quintanilla Schmidt, Vice President of El Salvador 1999-2004
- José Antonio Rodríguez Porth, Minister of Foreign Affairs 1978-79
- Lourdes Rodríguez de Flores, First Lady of El Salvador 1999-2004, daughter of José Antonio Rodríguez Porth
- Gloria Salguero Gross
- Michelle Sol Schweikert
- Maria Cristina Vilanova, First Lady of Guatemala 1951-1954
- Ariane de Rothschild
