= Demographics of El Salvador =

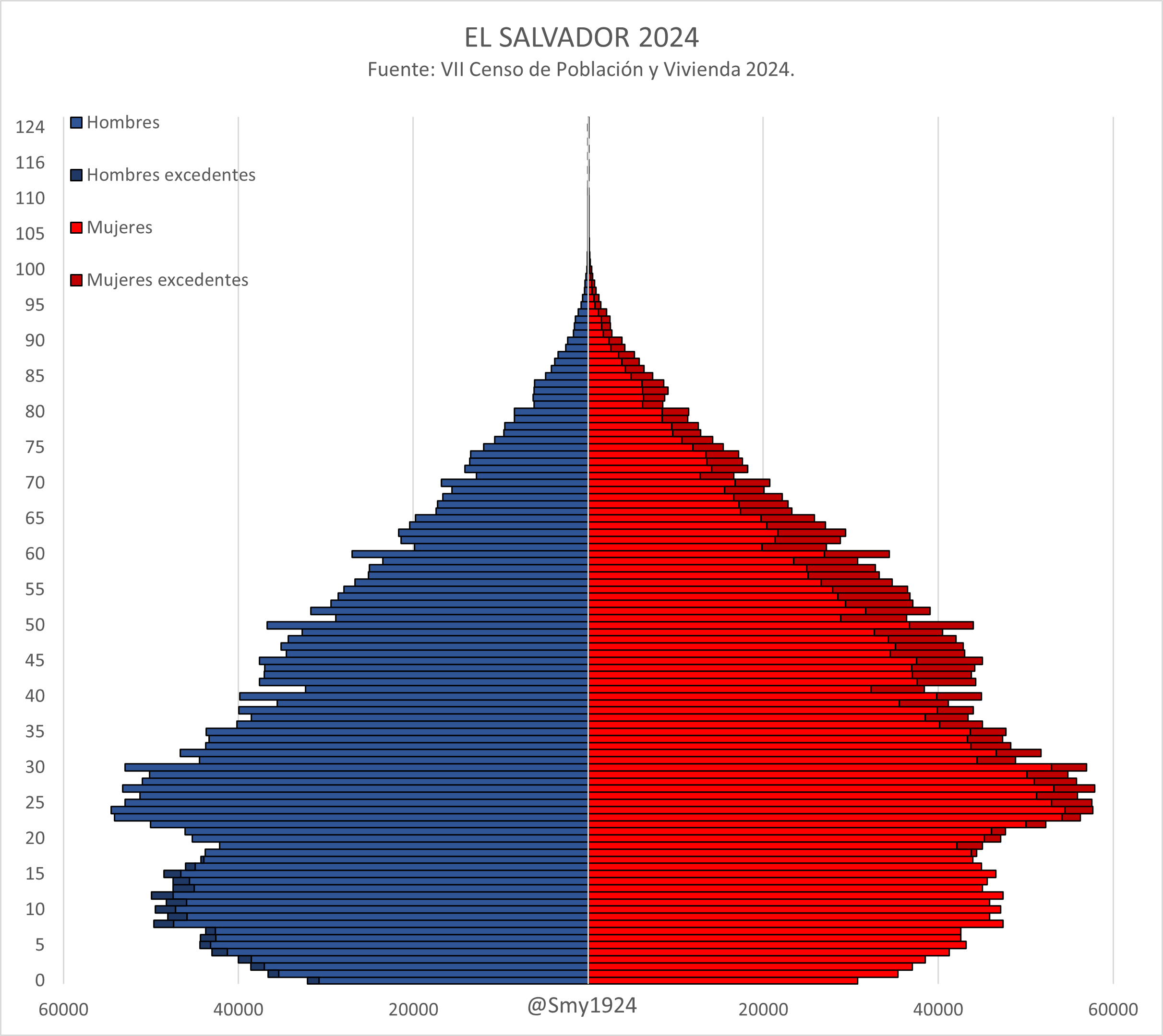
- Population pyramid of El Salvador in 2024
- Population: 6,029,976 (2024)
- Growth rate: ▼−0.33% (2024 est.)
- Birth rate: 10.43 births/1,000 population (2024)
- Death rate: 10.49 deaths/1,000 population (2024)
- Life expectancy: 75.37 years
  - male: 71.88 years
  - female: 79.04 years
- Fertility rate: 1.12 children born/woman (2025)
- Infant mortality: 12.14 deaths/1,000 live births
- Net migration rate: −3.2 migrant(s)/1,000 population (2025 est.)

Age structure
- 0–14 years: 25.48%
- 15–64 years: 65.47%
- 65 and over: 9.06%

Sex ratio
- Total: 0.92 male(s)/female (2022 est.)
- At birth: 1.05 male(s)/female
- Under 15: 1.05 male(s)/female
- 65 and over: 0.68 male(s)/female

Nationality
- Nationality: Salvadoran
- Major ethnic: Mestizo (86.3%)
- Minor ethnic: White (12.7%); Spanish (N/D); Italian (N/D); French (N/D); German (N/D); Arab (N/D); Others (N/D); Indigenous (0.2%); Black (0.1%); Other (0.6%)

Language
- Official: Spanish

This is a demography of the population of El Salvador including population density, ethnicity, education level, health of the populace, economic status, religious affiliations and other aspects of the population.

El Salvador's population numbers 6.03 million. Ethnically, 86.3% of Salvadorans are mixed (mixed Native Salvadoran and European (mostly Spanish) origin). Another 12.7% is of pure European descent, 1% are of pure indigenous descent, 0.16% are black and others are 0.64%.

== Population size and structure ==
Census population

Year	Pop.	±%
1930	1,434,361	—
1950	1,855,917	+29.4%
1961	2,510,984	+35.3%
1971	3,554,648	+41.6%

Year	Pop.	±%
1992	5,118,599	+44.0%
2007	5,744,113	+12.2%
2024	6,029,976	+5.0%

View source data.
View source data.

El Salvador's population was 6,314,167 in 2021, compared to 2,200,000 in 1950. In 2010 the percentage of the population below the age of 15 was 32.1%, 61% were between 15 and 65 years of age, while 6.9% were 65 years or older.

Year	Total population	Proportion per age group		
Year	Total population	Ages 0–14	Ages 15–64	Ages 65+
1950	2,200,000	42.7%	53.3%	4.0%
1955	2,433,000	43.6%	52.6%	3.8%
1960	2,773,000	45.1%	51.1%	3.7%
1965	3,244,000	46.3%	50.1%	3.7%
1970	3,736,000	46.4%	49.9%	3.6%
1975	4,232,000	45.8%	50.5%	3.7%
1980	4,661,000	45.2%	50.9%	3.9%
1985	5,004,000	44.1%	51.8%	4.2%
1990	5,344,000	41.7%	53.7%	4.6%
1995	5,748,000	39.6%	55.5%	4.9%
2000	5,888,000	36.6%	57.9%	5.5%
2005	6,052,000	34.8%	58.9%	6.3%
2010	6,184,000	31.6%	61.3%	7.1%
2015	6,325,000	28.4%	63.9%	7.8%
2020	6,486,000	26.6%	64.8%	8.7%

=== Structure of the population ===
Population by Sex and Age Group (Census 12.V.2007):

Age group	Male	Female	Total	%
Total	2 719 371	3 024 742	5 744 113	100%
0–4	283 272	272 621	555 893	9.68%
5–9	349 150	335 577	684 727	11.92%
10–14	359 523	346 824	706 347	12.30%
15–19	298 384	302 181	600 565	10.46%
20–24	228 001	258 541	486 542	8.47%
25–29	206 963	250 927	457 890	7.97%
30–34	178 400	223 849	402 249	7.00%
35–39	156 514	196 633	353 147	6.15%
40–44	132 218	171 413	303 631	5.29%
45–49	109 957	142 165	252 122	4.39%
50–54	95 275	120 459	215 734	3.76%
55–59	81 718	101 357	183 075	3.19%
60–64	68 207	83 657	151 864	2.64%
65–69	55 781	69 376	125 157	2.18%
70–74	43 449	54 008	97 457	1.70%
75–79	33 658	42 326	75 984	1.32%
80–84	20 401	26 469	46 870	0.82%
85+	18 500	26 359	44 859	0.78%
Age group	Male	Female	Total	Percent
0–14	991 945	955 022	1 946 967	33.89%
15–64	1 555 637	1 851 182	3 406 819	59.31%
65+	171 789	218 538	390 327	6.80%

Population Estimates by Sex and Age Group (01.VII.2011) (Estimates based on the 2007 Population Census) :

Age group	Male	Female	Total	%
Total	2 925 284	3 290 858	6 216 143	100%
0–4	309 786	296 430	606 216	9.75%
5–9	308 052	294 483	602 535	9.69%
10–14	362 232	348 111	710 343	11.43%
15–19	352 598	350 791	703 389	11.32%
20–24	276 109	305 559	581 668	9.36%
25–29	209 615	261 340	470 955	7.58%
30–34	180 198	235 412	415 609	6.69%
35–39	168 638	219 197	387 835	6.24%
40–44	149 955	194 952	344 907	5.55%
45–49	127 846	167 719	295 565	4.75%
50–54	108 714	140 978	249 692	4.02%
55–59	93 682	119 911	213 593	3.44%
60–64	78 899	100 625	179 525	2.89%
65–69	65 846	82 450	148 295	2.39%
70–74	52 993	66 934	119 928	1.93%
75–79	38 678	49 603	88 281	1.42%
80+	41 443	56 363	97 806	1.57%

Age group	Male	Female	Total	Percent
0–14	980 070	939 024	1 919 094	30.87%
15–64	1 746 254	2 096 484	3 842 738	61.82%
65+	198 960	255 350	454 310	7.31%

Population Estimates by Sex and Age Group (01.VII.2021) (Data refer to national projections based on 2007 census.) (Source: El Salvador National Population Estimates and Projections 2005–2050 (2021 revision).):

Age group	Male	Female	Total	%
Total	2 951 282	3 354 214	6 305 496	100%
0–4	264 147	252 388	516 535	8.19%
5–9	278 047	264 945	542 992	8.61%
10–14	280 173	266 743	546 916	8.67%
15–19	295 355	286 072	581 427	9.22%
20–24	308 532	314 355	622 887	9.88%
25–29	288 053	314 743	602 796	9.56%
30–34	219 270	269 966	489 236	7.76%
35–39	167 017	229 420	396 437	6.29%
40–44	146 976	207 506	354 482	5.62%
45–49	140 159	193 625	333 784	5.29%
50–54	127 022	173 103	300 125	4.76%
55–59	107 872	147 674	255 546	4.05%
60–64	89 592	122 042	211 634	3.36%
65–69	74 736	100 814	175 550	2.78%
70–74	60 083	80 828	140 911	2.23%
75–79	45 838	61 898	107 736	1.71%
80–84	31 845	43 639	75 484	1.20%
85+	31 030	40 319	71 349	1.13%
Age group	Male	Female	Total	Percent
0–14	822 367	784 076	1 606 443	25.48%
15–64	1 885 383	2 242 640	4 128 023	65.47%
65+	243 532	327 498	571 030	9.06%

== Vital statistics ==
=== UN estimates ===
The Population Department of the United Nations prepared the following estimates.

Period	Live births per year	Deaths per year	Natural change per year	CBR*	CDR*	NC*	TFR*	IMR*	Life expectancy		
Period	Live births per year	Deaths per year	Natural change per year	CBR*	CDR*	NC*	TFR*	IMR*	total	males	females
1950–1955	108 000	48 000	61 000	46.7	20.6	26.1	6.30	147	45.1	43.4	46.8
1955–1960	125 000	46 000	78 000	47.8	17.8	30.0	6.60	132	49.3	47.2	51.5
1960–1965	144 000	47 000	97 000	47.7	15.5	32.3	6.76	119	53.0	50.5	55.7
1965–1970	156 000	47 000	109 000	44.8	13.5	31.3	6.43	109	55.6	52.6	58.9
1970–1975	168 000	49 000	119 000	42.1	12.3	29.8	5.95	100	57.0	53.2	61.2
1975–1980	177 000	52 000	124 000	39.7	11.8	27.9	5.46	91	57.0	51.9	62.7
1980–1985	174 000	55 000	119 000	36.1	11.4	24.7	4.80	77	56.9	50.6	64.2
1985–1990	171 000	44 000	126 000	33.0	8.6	24.4	4.20	56	63.1	57.4	69.1
1990–1995	169 000	37 000	132 000	30.5	6.8	23.8	3.73	38	68.0	63.3	72.9
1995–2000	161 000	38 000	123 000	27.5	6.6	20.9	3.30	27	69.2	64.4	73.9
2000–2005	133 000	75 000	94 000	22.7	6.7	16.0	2.72	23	70.2	65.4	74.9
2005–2010	127 000	90 000	87 000	20.4	6.8	13.6	2.40	21	71.3	66.5	75.9
2010–2015				19.1	6.9	12.2	2.17				
2015–2020				18.4	7.0	11.4	2.05				
2020–2025				17.2	7.2	10.0	1.96				
2025–2030				15.6	7.4	8.2	1.87				
* CBR = crude birth rate (per 1000); CDR = crude death rate (per 1000); NC = natural change (per 1000); IMR = infant mortality rate per 1000 births; TFR = total fertility rate (number of children per woman)

=== Registered data ===
	Average population	Live births	Deaths	Natural change	Crude birth rate (per 1000)	Crude death rate (per 1000)	Natural change (per 1000)	Crude migration change (per 1000)	TFR
1940	1,633,000	74,637			45.7				
1941	1,654,000	72,376			43.8				
1942	1,675,000	71,414			42.6				
1943	1,697,000	71,554			42.2				
1944	1,719,000	72,590			42.2				
1945	1,742,000	74,660			42.9				
1946	1,764,000	72,042	30,996	41,046	40.8	17.6	23.2	−10.6	
1947	1,788,000	84,330	30,719	53,611	47.2	17.2	30.0	−16.4	
1948	1,811,000	80,770	30,527	50,243	44.6	16.9	27.7	−14.8	
1949	1,835,000	84,839	28,339	56,500	46.2	15.4	30.8	−17.5	
1950	2,200,000	90,557	27,454	63,103	41.2	12.5	28.7		
1951	2,237,000	93,634	29,030	64,604	41.8	13.0	28.9	−12.1	
1952	2,280,000	96,802	32,423	64,379	42.5	14.2	28.2	−9.0	
1953	2,327,000	98,474	30,280	68,194	42.3	13.0	29.3	−8.7	
1954	2,378,000	102,009	31,810	70,199	42.9	13.4	29.5	−7.6	
1955	2,433,000	105,040	31,151	73,889	43.2	12.8	30.4	−7.3	
1956	2,491,000	106,539	28,127	78,412	42.8	11.3	31.5	−7.7	
1957	2,553,000	114,929	32,893	82,036	45.0	12.9	32.1	−7.2	
1958	2,621,000	115,154	32,831	82,323	43.9	12.5	31.4	−4.8	
1959	2,694,000	115,622	30,038	85,584	42.9	11.1	31.8	−3.9	
1960	2,773,000	121,403	28,768	92,635	43.8	10.4	33.4	−4.1	
1961	2,859,000	124,871	28,471	96,400	43.7	10.0	33.7	-2.7	
1962	2,951,000	127,154	30,342	96,812	43.1	10.3	32.8	-0.6	
1963	3,047,000	133,395	29,614	103,781	43.8	9.7	34.1	-1.6	
1964	3,145,000	133,072	29,496	103,576	42.3	9.4	32.9	-0.7	
1965	3,244,000	137,430	30,906	106,524	42.4	9.5	32.8	-1.3	
1966	3,342,000	137,950	30,368	107,582	41.3	9.1	32.2	-2.0	
1967	3,440,000	139,955	28,957	110,998	40.7	8.4	32.2	-2.9	
1968	3,537,000	140,986	29,863	111,123	39.8	8.4	31.4	-3.2	
1969	3,636,000	142,699	33,655	109,044	39.2	9.2	29.9	-1.9	
1970	3,736,000	141,471	35,094	106,377	37.8	9.4	28.4	-0.9	
1971	3,836,000	154,309	28,752	125,557	40.2	7.5	32.7	-5.9	
1972	3,938,000	153,464	32,383	121,081	38.9	8.2	30.7	-4.1	
1973	4,038,000	155,632	31,865	123,767	38.5	7.9	30.6	-5.2	
1974	4,137,000	158,524	30,494	128,030	38.3	7.4	30.9	-6.4	
1975	4,232,000	159,731	31,601	128,130	37.7	7.5	30.3	-7.3	
1976	4,325,000	165,822	30,826	134,996	38.3	7.1	31.2	-9.2	
1977	4,414,000	177,531	33,009	144,522	40.2	7.5	32.7	-12.1	
1978	4,500,000	172,897	30,086	142,811	38.4	6.7	31.7	-12.2	
1979	4,582,000	174,183	32,936	141,247	38.0	7.2	30.8	-12.6	
1980	4,661,000	169,930	38,967	130,963	36.4	8.4	28.1	-10.9	
1981	4,734,000	163,305	37,468	125,837	34.5	7.9	26.6	-10.9	
1982	4,805,000	156,796	33,284	123,512	32.6	6.9	25.7	-10.7	
1983	4,872,000	144,193	32,697	111,496	29.6	6.7	22.9	-9.0	
1984	4,938,000	142,202	28,854	113,348	28.8	5.8	23.0	-9.5	
1985	5,004,000	139,514	27,225	112,289	27.9	5.4	22.5	-9.1	
1986	5,069,000	145,126	25,731	119,395	28.7	5.1	23.6	-10.6	
1987	5,134,000	148,355	27,581	120,774	28.9	5.4	23.6	-10.8	
1988	5,200,000	149,299	27,774	121,525	28.8	5.4	23.4	-10.5	
1989	5,269,000	151,859	27,768	124,091	28.9	5.3	23.6	-10.3	
1990	5,344,000	148,360	28,195	120,165	27.8	5.3	22.5	-8.3	
1991	5,425,000	151,210	27,066	124,144	27.9	5.0	22.9	-7.7	
1992	5,511,000	154,014	27,869	126,145	27.9	5.1	22.9	-7.0	
1993	5,597,000	168,000	38,000	130,000	30.0	6.8	23.2	-7.6	
1994	5,628,898	160,772	29,407	131,365	28.3	5.2	23.1	-8.6	
1995	5,687,923	159,336	29,130	130,206	27.7	5.1	22.7	-10.4	
1996	5,742,199	163,007	28,904	134,103	28.1	5.0	23.1	-12.8	
1997	5,791,778	164,143	29,118	135,025	28.0	5.0	23.1	-14.8	
1998	5,835,311	158,350	29,919	128,431	26.9	5.1	21.8	-15.0	
1999	5,873,479	153,636	28,056	125,580	25.9	4.7	21.2	-15.4	
2000	5,904,051	150,176	28,154	122,022	25.2	4.7	20.5	-15.4	
2001	5,923,881	138,354	29,959	108,395	23.1	5.0	18.1	-13.7	
2002	5,934,180	129,363	27,458	101,905	21.5	4.6	17.0	-13.2	
2003	5,938,093	124,476	29,377	95,099	20.6	4.9	15.8	-12.3	
2004	5,937,875	119,710	30,058	89,652	19.8	5.0	14.8	-11.4	
2005	5,933,402	112,769	30,933	81,836	18.6	5.1	13.5	-9.7	
2006	5,929,022	107,111	31,453	75,658	17.6	5.2	12.4	-8.4	
2007	5,932,052	106,471	31,349	75,122	17.4	5.1	12.3	-8.0	2.4
2008	5,957,340	111,278	31,594	79,684	18.1	5.1	13.0	-8.2	
2009	6,006,046	107,880	32,872	75,008	17.5	5.3	12.2	-7.1	
2010	6,055,816	104,939	32,586	72,353	17.0	5.3	11.7	-6.0	
2011	6,098,903	109,384	33,211	76,173	17.6	5.3	12.3	-6.1	
2012	6,137,167	110,843	32,148	78,695	17.7	5.1	12.6	-18.2	2.3
2013	6,159,710	109,617	34,212	75,405	17.4	5.4	12.0	-12.2	2.2
2014	6,173,271	108,712	37,461	71,442	17.2	5.9	11.3	-8.2	
2015	6,174,482	107,885	40,869	67,016	17.1	6.5	10.6	-7.3	
2016	6,156,482	96,287	41,459	55,368	15.2	6.5	8.7	-5.8	
2017	6,137,548	93,728	39,835	53,893	14.9	6.3	8.5	-6.2	
2018	6,119,893	92,170	38,595	53,575	14.6	6.1	8.5	-6.7	
2019	6,111,225	98,614	40,746	57,868	16.4	6.3	13.1	-7.7	
2020	6,121,204	87,680	51,325	36,355	13.9	8.1	5.8	-4.8	
2021	6,133,773	77,383	51,103	26,280	12.2	8.1	4.1	-3.4	1.8
2022	6,141,122	75,834	45,330	30,504	12.3	7.4	4.9	-3.7	
2023	6,146,900	72,821	47,443	25,378	11.9	7.7	4.2	-3.3	
2024	6,147,648	69,891			11.3				1.32
2025	6,146,970	67,523			11.0				1.30

=== Fertility ===
Years	1920	1921	1922	1923	1924	1925	1926	1927	1928	1929
Total Fertility Rate in El Salvador	6.05	6.15	6.24	6.26	6.27	6.28	6.30	6.31	6.30	6.28

Years	1930	1931	1932	1933	1934	1935	1936	1937	1938	1939
Total Fertility Rate in El Salvador	6.26	6.25	6.23	6.20	6.17	6.14	6.11	6.08	6.08	6.07

Years	1940	1941	1942	1943	1944	1945	1946	1947	1948	1949
Total Fertility Rate in El Salvador	6.07	6.06	6.06	6.05	6.04	6.02	6.01	6.00	6.05	6.11

== Ethnic groups ==
Out of the 6,408,111 people in El Salvador, 86.3% are Mestizo, 15% are European, 1% Indigenous, 0.8% Afro-Salvadorans, and 0.64% other.

=== Indigenous Salvadorans ===
Map of El Salvador's Indigenous Peoples at the time of the Spanish conquest: 1. Pipil people, 2. Lenca people, 3. Kakawira o Cacaopera, 4. Xinca, 5. Maya Ch'orti' people, 6. Maya Poqomam people, 7. Mangue o Chorotega.

According to the Salvadoran government, about 1% of the population are of full or partial indigenous origin (principally Pipil, located in the west and central part of the country, and Lenca, found east of the Lempa River) also there are small populations of Cacaopera people in the Morazán Department. In the prehispanic age, the largest most dominant Native Salvadoran groups in the actual territory of El Salvador were the Lenca people and Pipil people followed by small enclaves of Maya peoples: (Poqomam people/Chorti people), Cacaopera people, Xinca people, and Mangue people.

The number of indigenous people in El Salvador have been criticized by indigenous organizations and academics as too small and accuse the government of denying the existence of indigenous Salvadorans in the country. According to the National Salvadoran Indigenous Coordination Council (CCNIS) and CONCULTURA (National Council for Art and Culture at the Ministry of Education ), approximately 70,000 or 1 per cent of Salvadorian peoples are indigenous. Nonetheless, very few Amerindians have retained their customs and traditions, having over time assimilated into the dominant Mestizo/Spanish culture. The low numbers of indigenous people may be partly explained by historically high rates of old-world diseases, absorption into the Mestizo population, as well as mass murder during the 1932 Salvadoran peasant uprising (or La Matanza) which saw (estimates of) up to 30,000 peasants killed in a short period of time. Many authors note that since La Matanza the indigenous in El Salvador have been very reluctant to describe themselves as such (in census declarations for example) or to wear indigenous dress or be seen to be taking part in any cultural activities or customs that might be understood as indigenous. Departments and cities in the country with notable indigenous populations include Sonsonate (especially Izalco, Nahuizalco, Cuisnahuat, San Antonio del Monte, and Santo Domingo), Cacaopera, San Simón and Panchimalco, in the department of San Salvador.

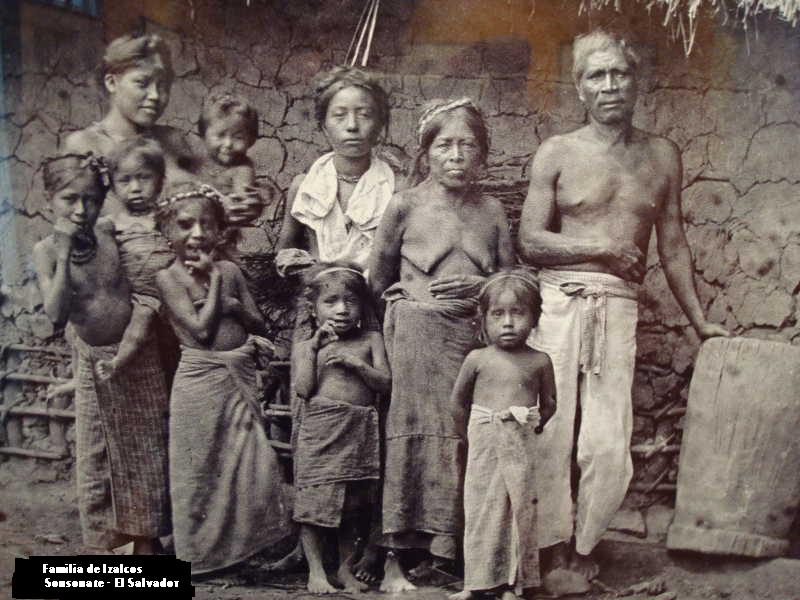
Indigenous Izalco family in Sonsonate

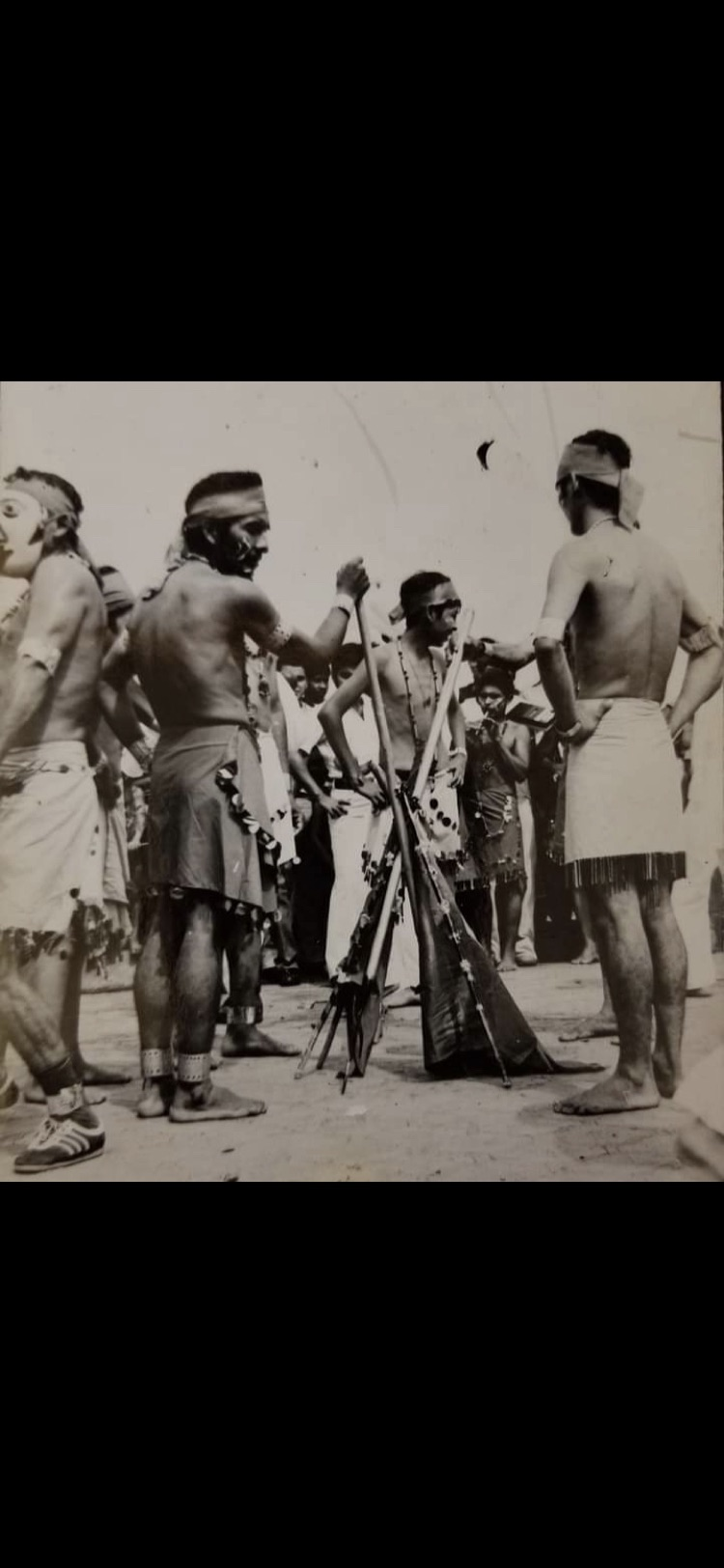
Indigenous Lenca people in Yucuaiquin 1988

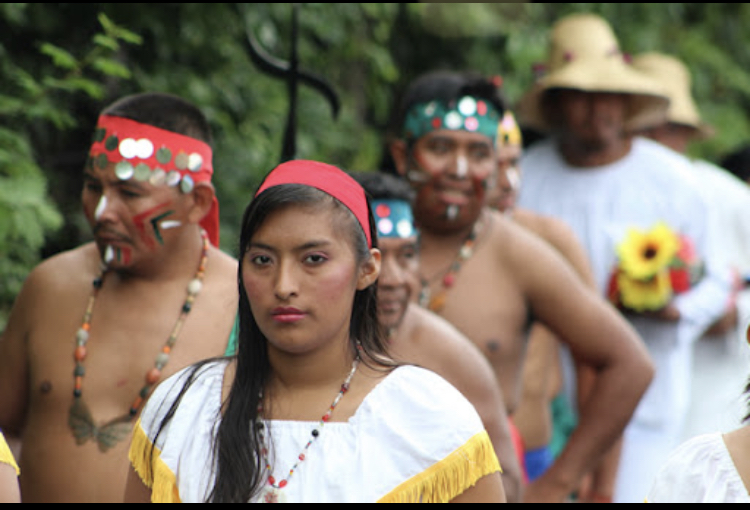
indigenous Lencas in Yucuaiquin 2014

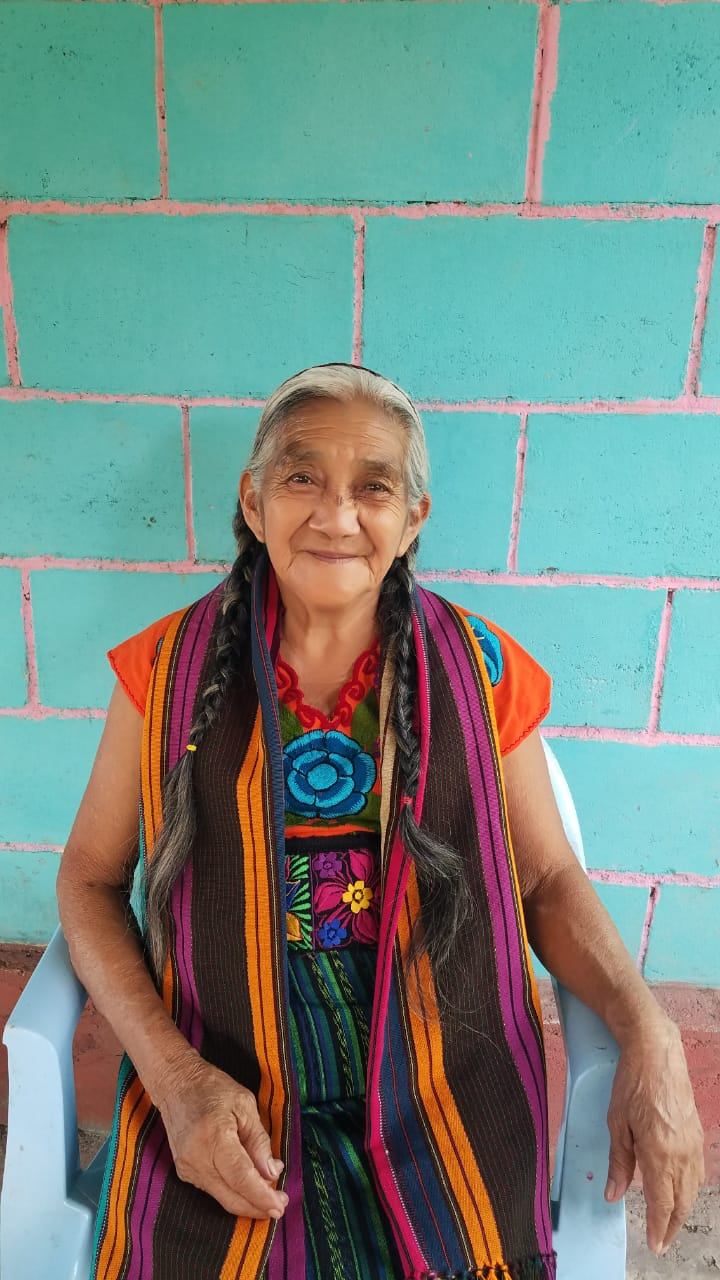
Indigenous woman from Santo Domingo de Guzmán, El Salvador

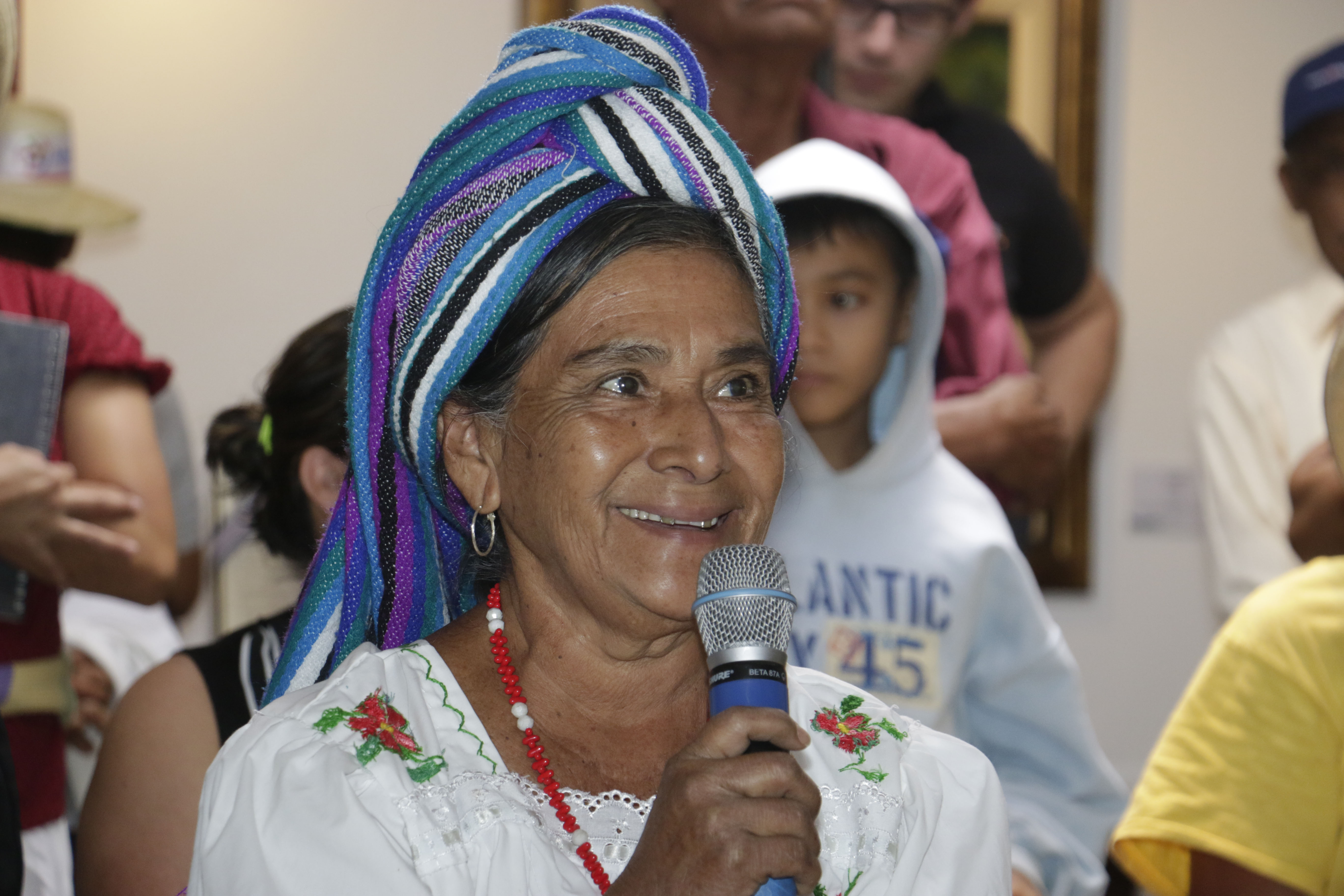
Indigenous woman in El Salvador

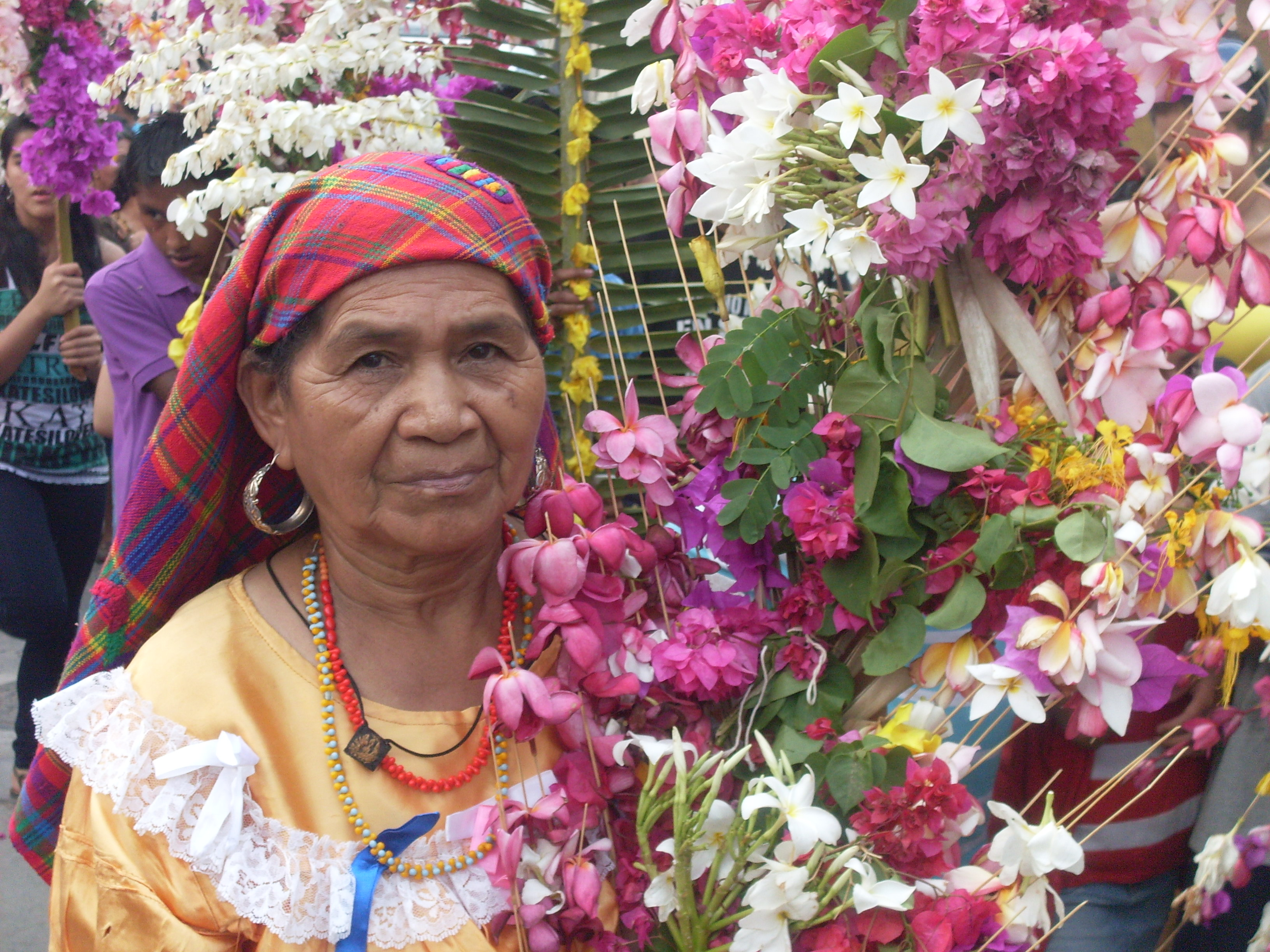
Indigenous Salvadoran woman from Panchimalco

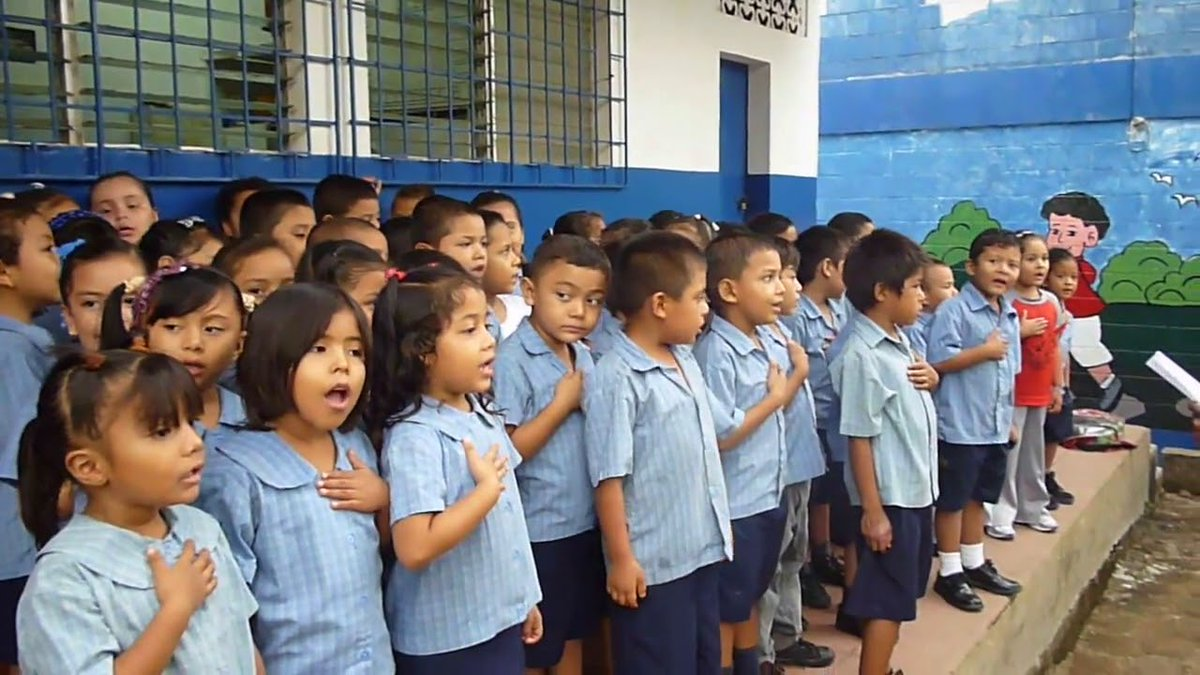
Salvadoran school children singing the national anthem

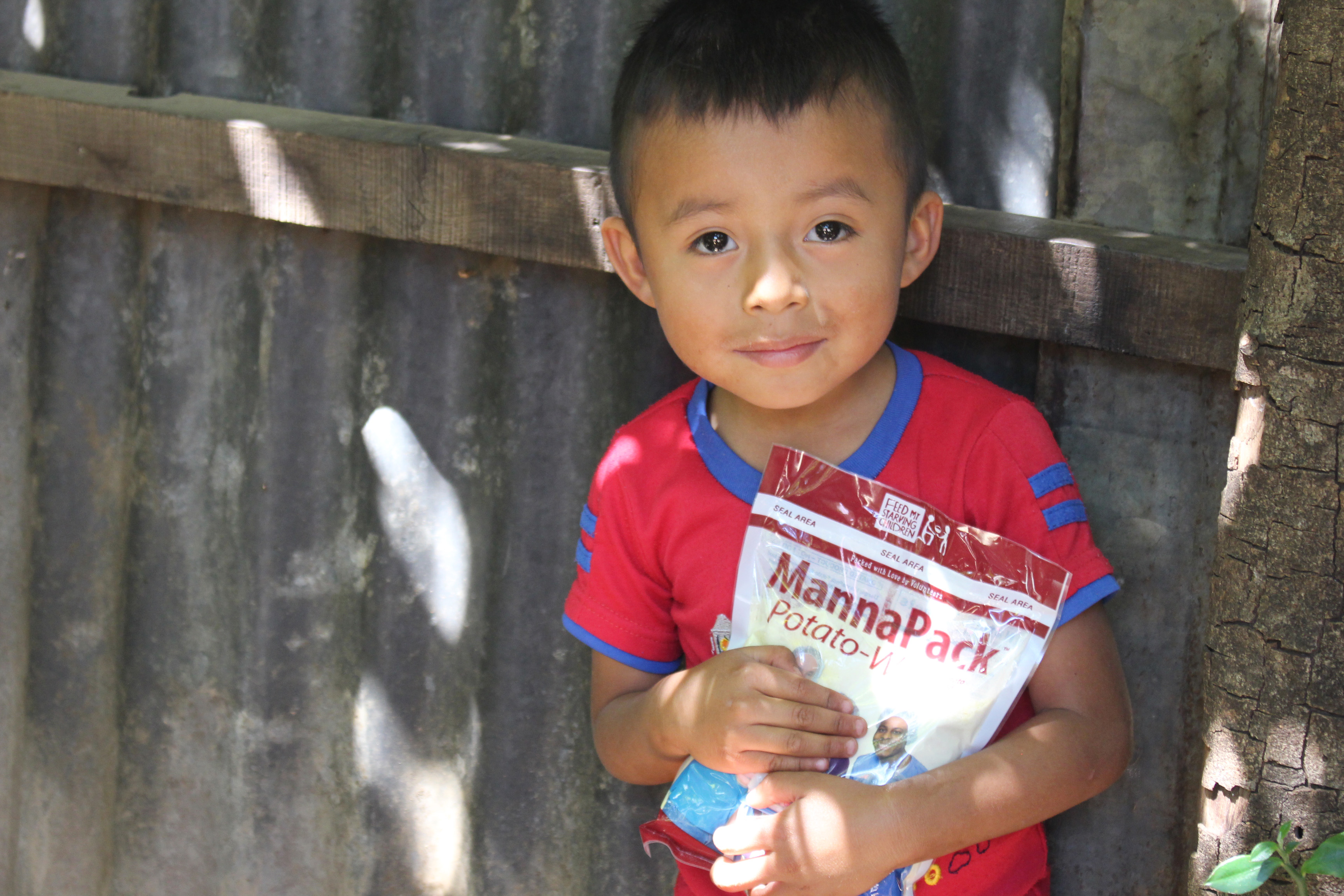
Salvadoran child

=== Mestizo Salvadorans ===
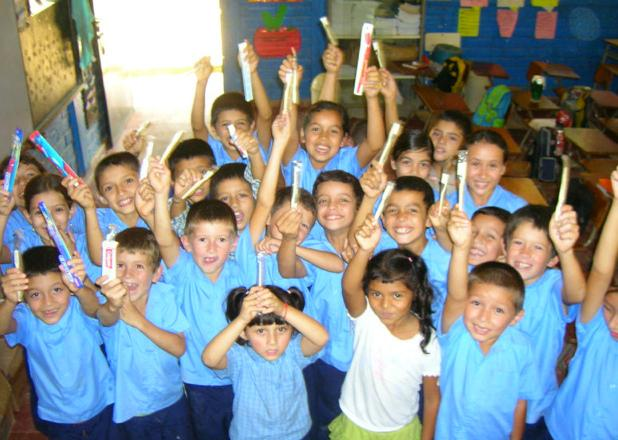
Salvadoran children from Metapan

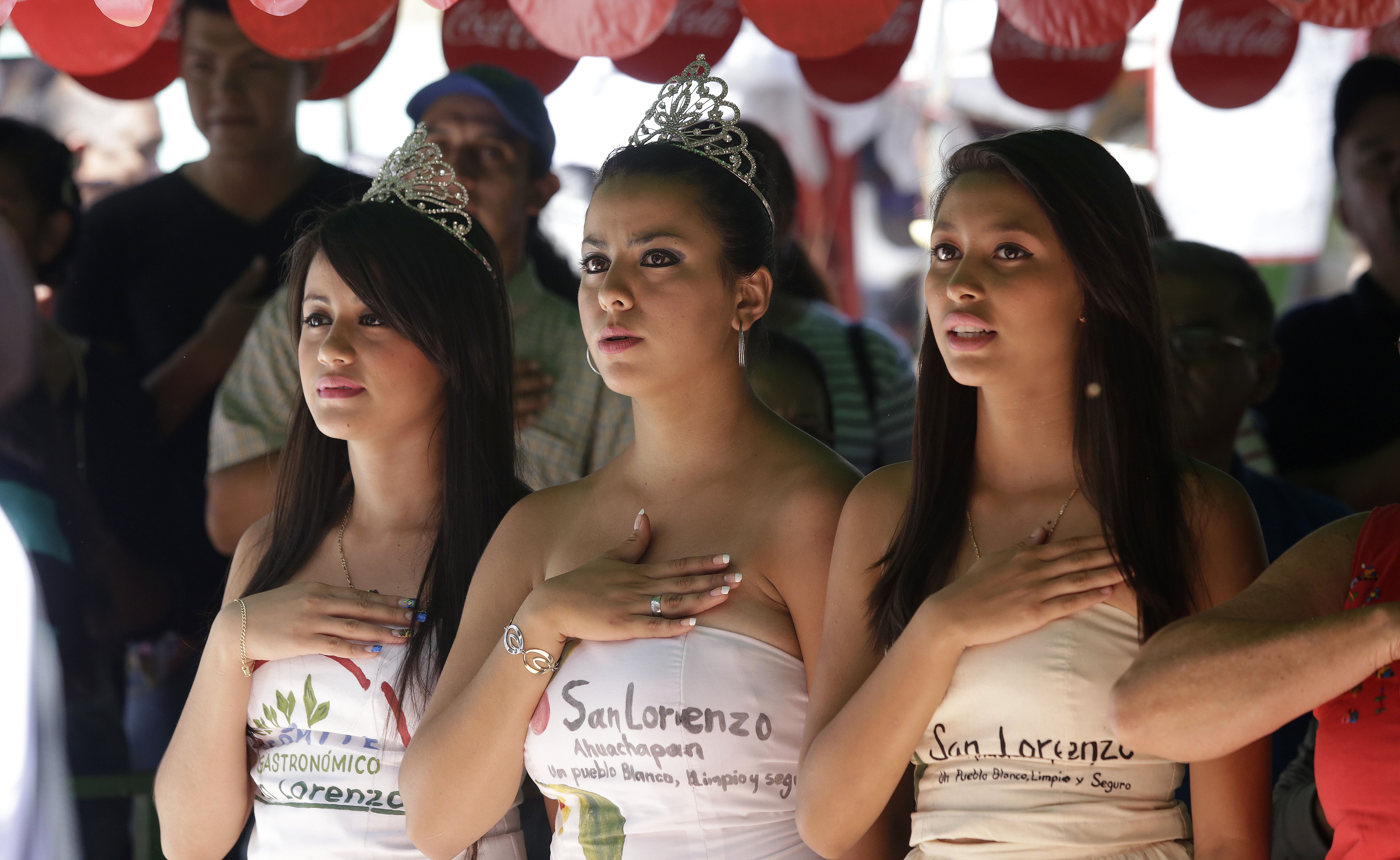
Young Salvadoran women in Ahuachapán

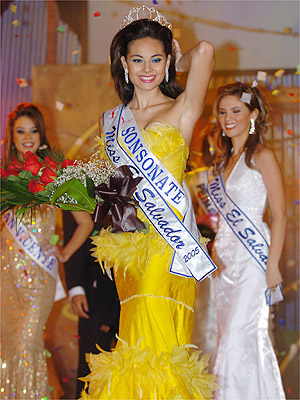
Irma Dimas and other Salvadoran beauty queens

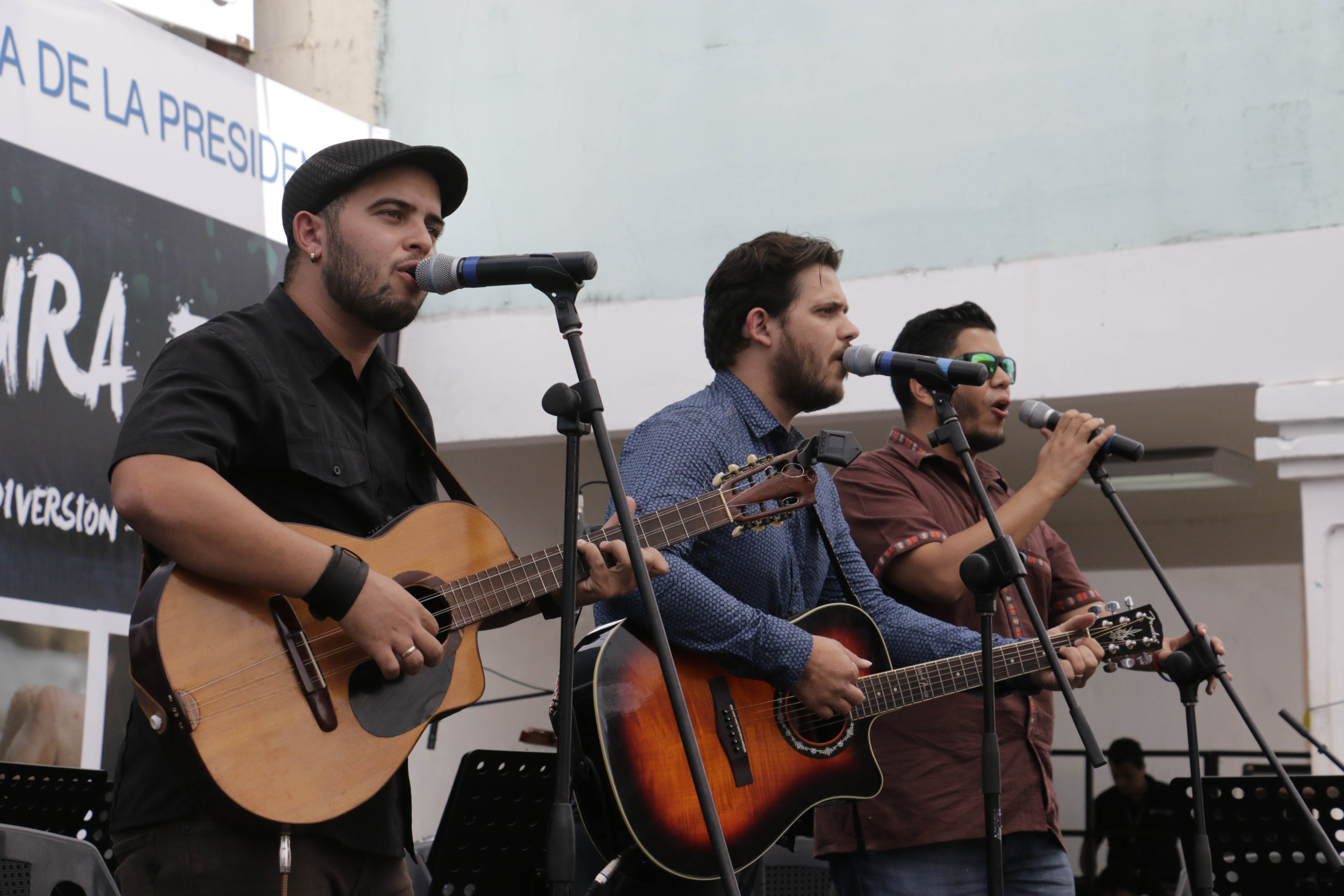
Salvadoran musical group in San Salvador

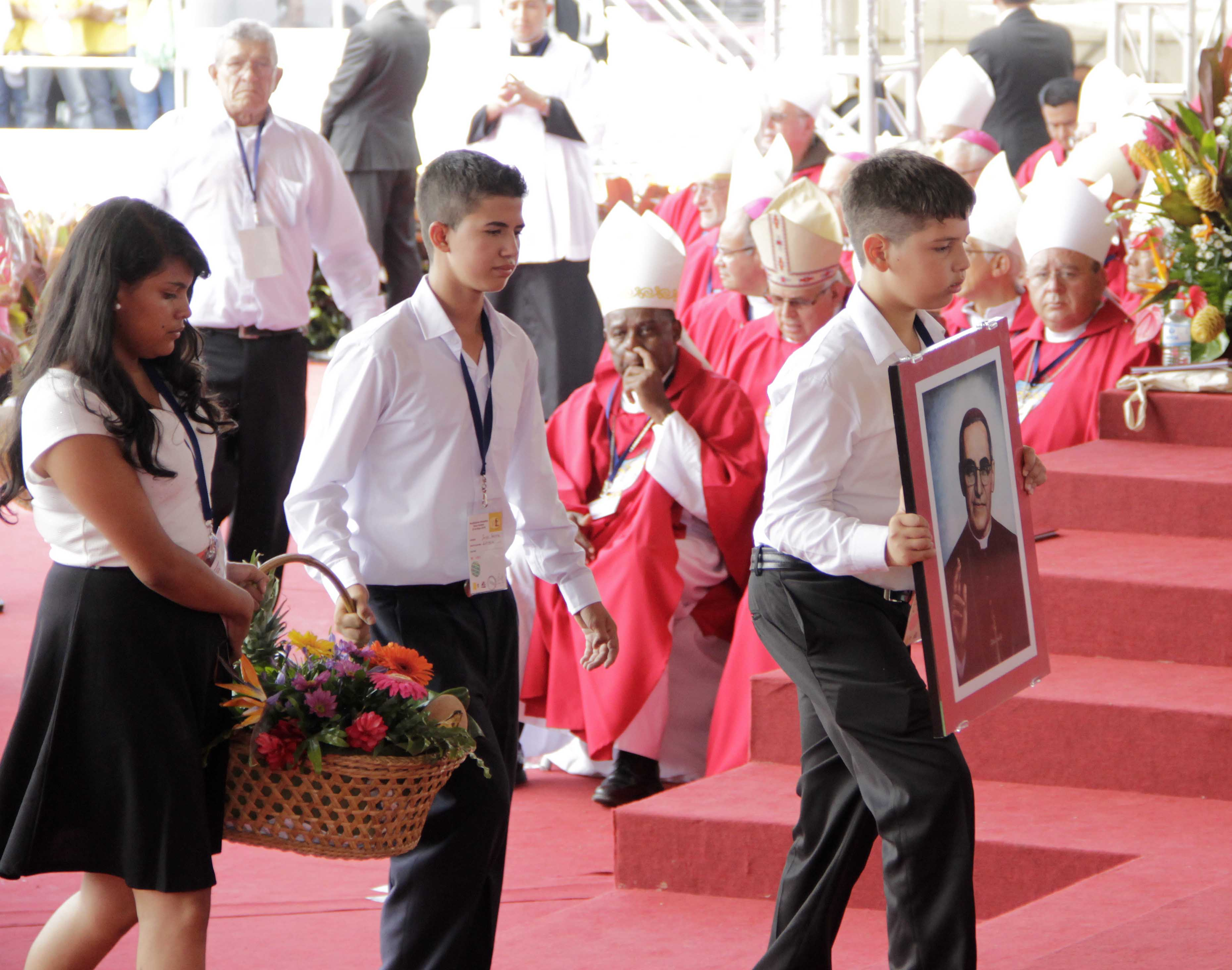
Salvadoran children in the beatification of Monseñor Oscar Romero

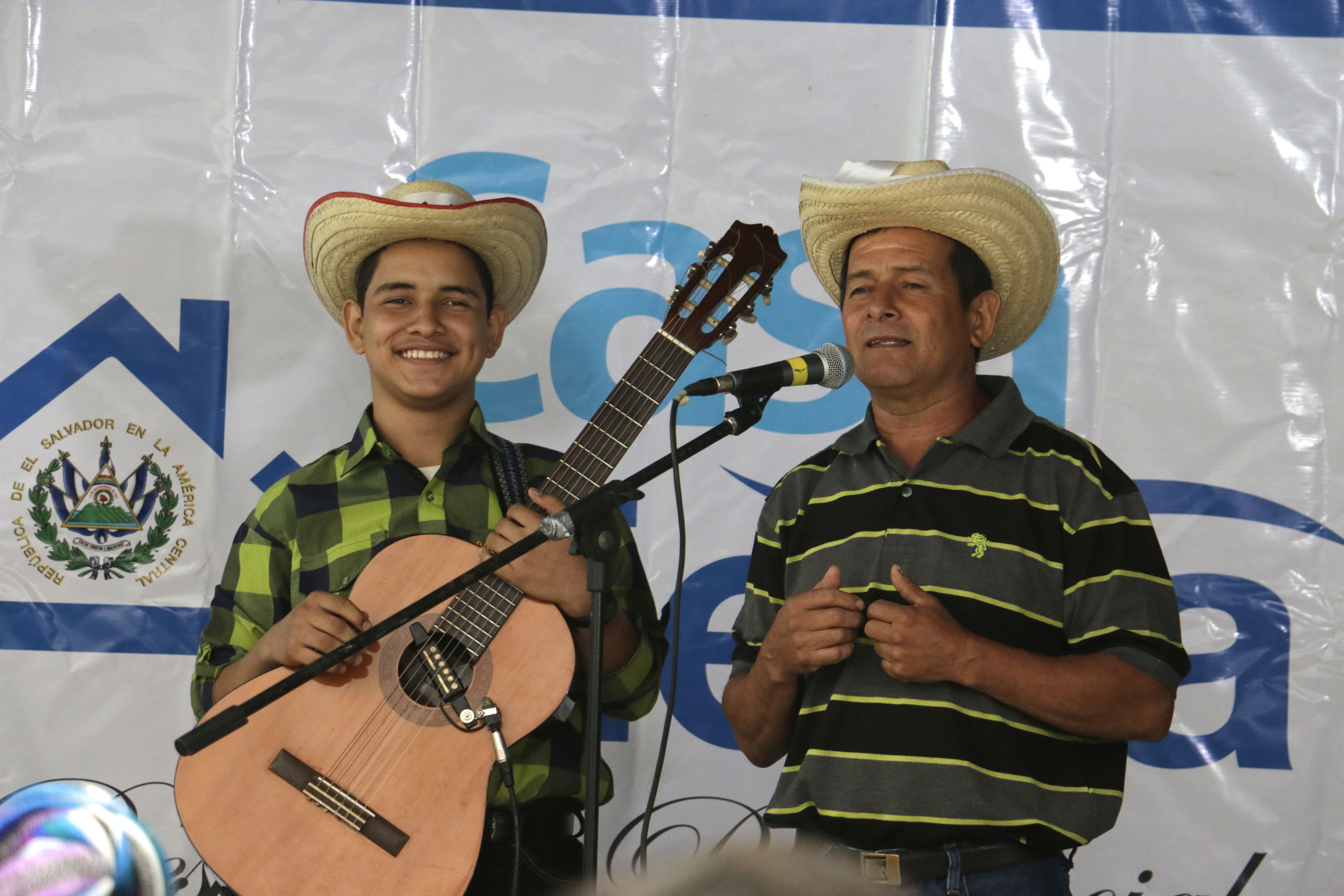
Salvadoran singer Jair Noyola and his father

An estimated 86.3% of the population are Mestizo/Castizo, having mixed indigenous and European ancestry. Historical evidence and census supports the explanation of "strong sexual asymmetry", as a result of a strong bias favoring matings between European males and Native Salvadoran females, and to statistically significant indigenous male mortality during the Conquest. The genetics thus suggests the native men were sharply reduced in numbers due to the war and disease. Large numbers of Spaniard men settled in the region and had children with the local women. The Natives were forced to adopt Spanish names, language, and religion, and in this way, the Lencas and Pipil women and children were Westernised. A vast majority over 90% of Salvadorans are Mestizo/Native Salvadoran.

=== European Salvadorans ===
==== Spanish Salvadorans ====
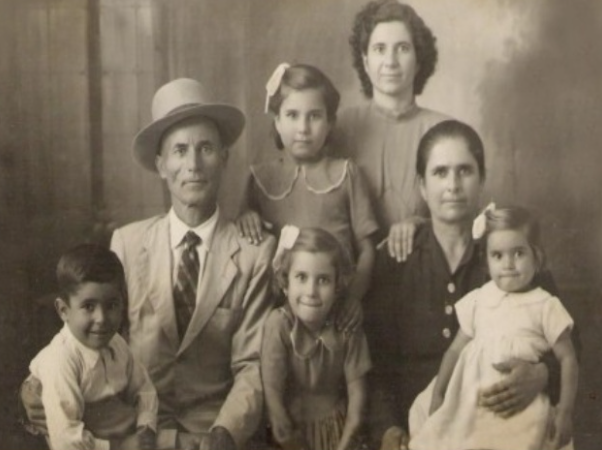
A Galician Spanish family in the Chalatenango Department of El Salvador

Salarrué and his mother. Salarrué was an important Salvadoran writer, poet, and painter. Of Spanish descent, his father Alejandro Arrué Jimenez came to El Salvador from the Basque Country.

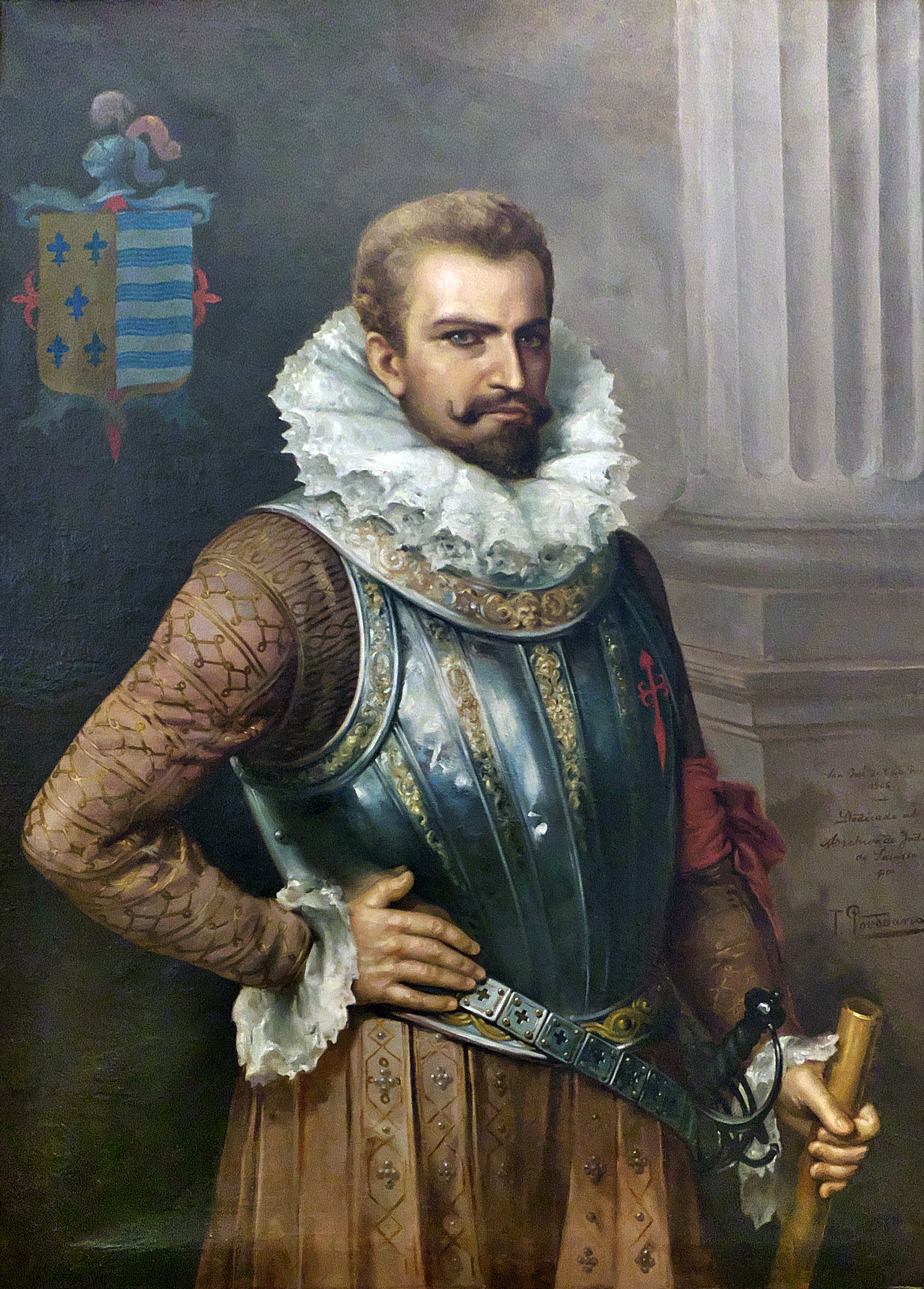
Conquistador Pedro de Alvarado and his army first entered territories of what is now El Salvador in 1524, founding the city of San Salvador in 1525.

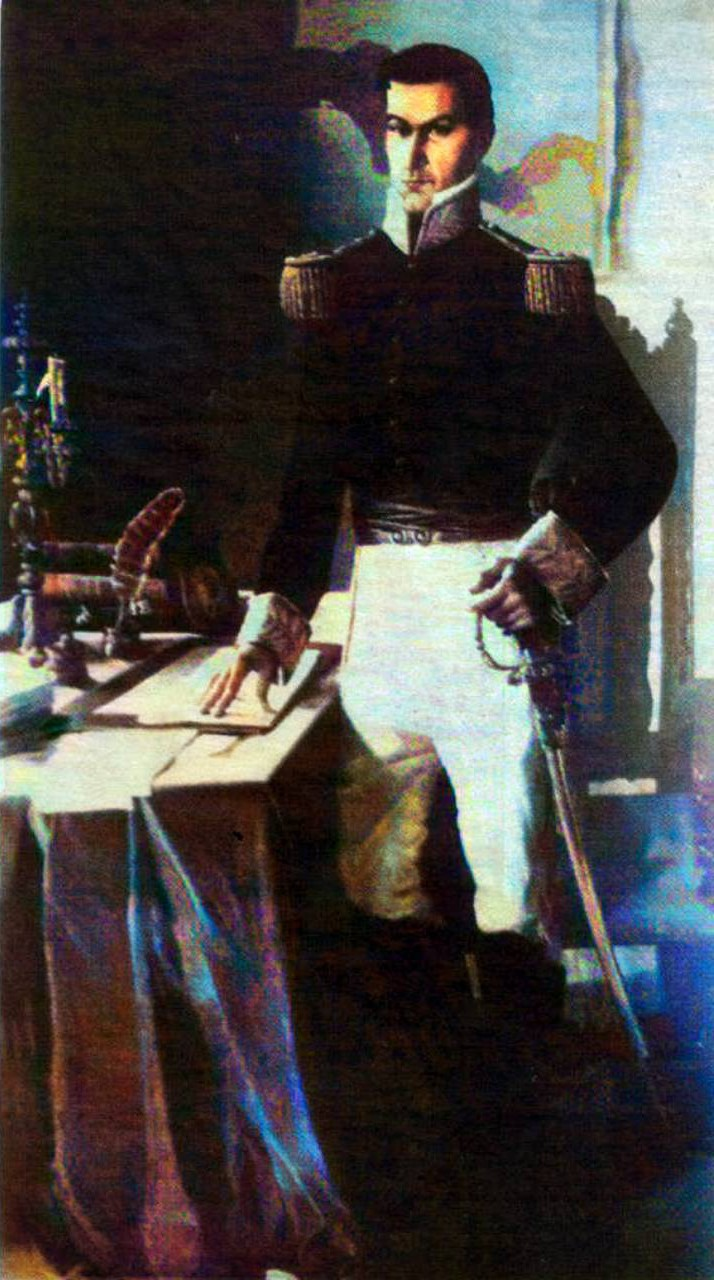
General Manuel José Arce; decorated Salvadoran General and president of the Federal Republic of Central America from 1825 to 1829

Spaniards began to settle in El Salvador in the mid-1520s. Some 12.7% of Salvadorans are white. This population is made up of those of Spanish origin, while there are also Salvadorans of French, German, Swiss, English, Irish, and Italian descent. A majority of Central European settlers in El Salvador arrived during World War II as refugees from the Czech Republic, Germany, Hungary, Poland, and Switzerland with many settling in the region that is now Chalatenango in the late 18th century. In 1789, Francisco Luis Héctor de Carondelet was named governor of El Salvador. Because the local indigenous population working in the indigo industry had declined greatly, Carondolet recruited Spanish laborers from northern Spain to settle in El Salvador. In 1790, de Carondelet, ordered families from the north of Spain (Galicia, Asturias, the Basque Country, Cantabria and Navarra) to settle in the area to compensate for the lack of indigenous people to work the land; important settlements of these Spaniards were the Northern and Central parts of El Salvador. Their descendants are among the blonde and fair-skinned people of today's Chalatenango Department.

During 1880 to 1920, El Salvador had its Migratory Peak of Immigrants from Europe, as well as immigrants from nearby countries, Asians and other North Americans, when more than 120,000 arrived in El Salvador, the demographic weight was unprecedented, in 1880 the Population was of 480,000 inhabitants and by 1920 it was already 1,170,000. the main groups were the Spanish, Italians, Germans and some French, Polish and British

==== French Salvadorans ====
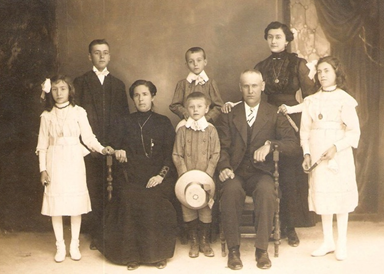
French family in San Salvador, c. 1910–1915

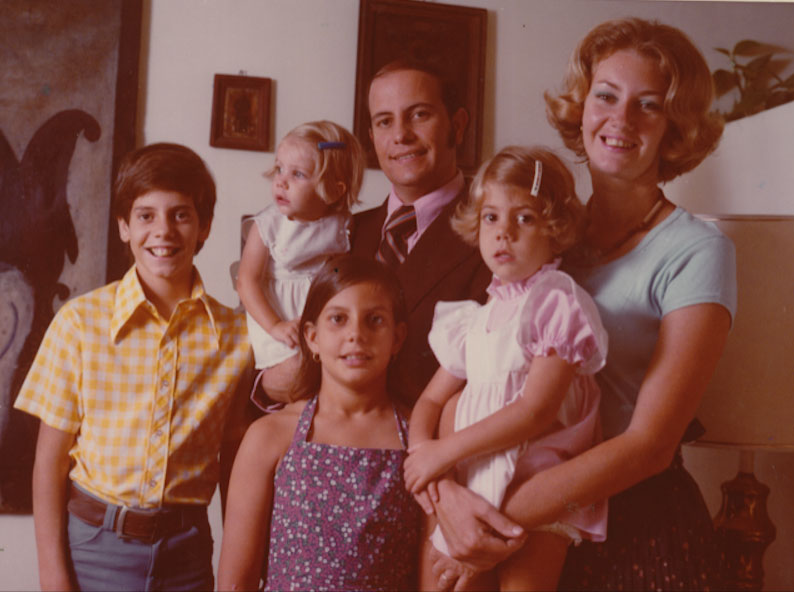
Salvador Llort Choussy and his family. Salvador Llort and his brother Fernando Llort were artists, painters and sculpturists who are noted for their contribution in modern Salvadoran art often dubbed "El Salvador's National Artist".

The French Immigration to the Republic of El Salvador was an important movement that the country received between the 19th century and the middle of the 20th century. Between 1850 and 1870, the French formed the largest foreign group in El Salvador. Later in 1940 to 1950, they formed one of the largest groups in the country, only surpassed by the Spanish and Italians. Between 1850 and 1870, El Salvador was the main recipient of French in Central America, most were merchants and businessmen together with their families.

It is estimated that between 1850 and 1950, more than 7,000 French emigrated to El Salvador, the majority came from Aquitaine, Occitania and the Alps. Between 1850 and 1870, 2,000 French arrived in El Salvador; between 1911 and 1937, 2,000 French entered the country, and finally in 1938 to 1945, 2,500 French entered the country. French immigration at that time greatly influenced the economy and education.

Since the colonial period there is a record of French in Salvadoran territory, in which several French corsairs and French pirates stand out In 1850. Several French businessmen and merchants left for El Salvador to work in different types of jobs such as commerce, planting of sugar cane, industry and cultivation of coffee. During that time 2,000 French arrived in the territory, most were wealthy families and merchants. Most of the French who would arrive between 1880 and 1910 were merchants and professionals, but from 1911 to 1937, immigration would begin to shine again for various reasons. Many businessmen and merchants arrived in Salvadoran territory, at that time French investment in El Salvador was equal to that of the United States. During that period of time 2,000 French entered El Salvador. According to historical records, the French were the third largest group of foreigners in the country, only surpassed by the Spanish and Italians.

The majority of the French who arrived in the national territory first came from Corsica later in 1850 to 1950, the majority of the French who arrived in the territory were from Aquitaine, Occitanie and Rhône-Alpes but also Paris and other parts of the Alps, most of the French settled in San Salvador, however the City of Santa Tecla in the La Libertad Department (El Salvador) historically received large numbers of French Immigrants, other places with significant numbers are Santa Ana and Antiguo Cuscatlán.

==== German Salvadorans ====
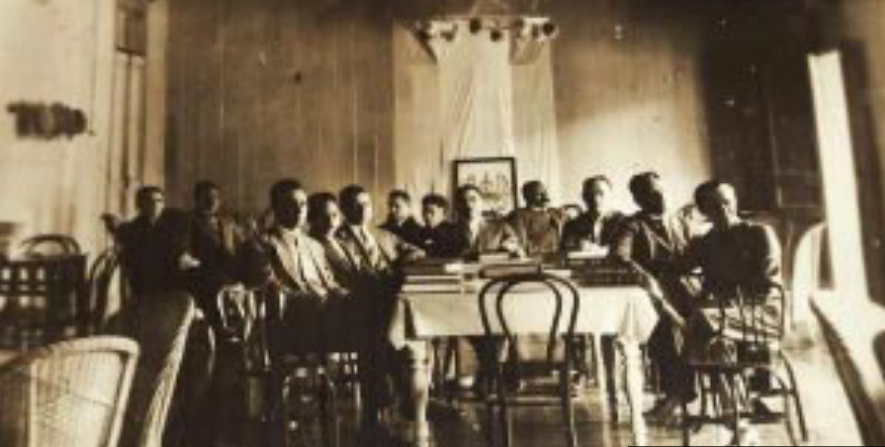
German Salvadoran immigrants in Berlín, Usulután, German settlement in El Salvador

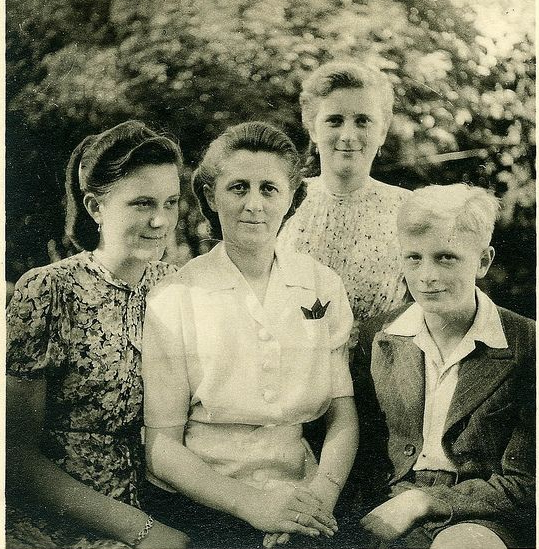
German family in Santa Tecla, El Salvador, c. 1930–1940

German immigration to El Salvador was a migratory movement that began between 1880 and 1940, when the largest influx of Germans is recorded. The first Germans in El Salvador joined their mostly wealthy families in 1870 establishing coffee shops. At that time El Salvador had implemented the liberal reforms that attracted thousands of immigrants from Europe, Middle East and Asia, as well as the German immigration in the country, more families migrated to El Salvador and the agricultural land was also distributed. The main settlements of these families were the coffee-growing areas and also large cities like Nueva San Salvador now known as Santa Tecla, San Salvador, Chalatenango, Cuscatlan, Usulután and other areas where German immigrants saw economic opportunities in the country, they excelled in industry, commerce and farming.

One of the most famous Germans who immigrated to El Salvador was Walter Thilo Deininger, who moved to the Cuscatlan department in 1885. He soon built his coffee estate and other industries. Soon after, arrived more German families to Cuscatlán, as well as important people like Jürgen Hübner, a German historian and author of "Die Deutschen und El Salvador (The Germans and El Salvador).

By 1890, Germans were one of the country's largest immigrant groups and were able to settle and stand out from the crowd of other European immigrants. Germans numbers in El Salvador later increased, their descendants were much more than the number of German immigrants living in El Salvador. There were cities founded by German families, like Berlín, Usulután which is a very clear example of a settlement founded by a German. Later other Germans families came to the area. North of El Salvador, specifically what is now north of Metapan and Chalatenango, existed German settlements.

The Usulutan department was the area with the greatest presence of Germans in El Salvador. The Germans started arriving in the early 1900s and settled down to produce coffee.

The book, “The Population of El Salvador”, by Rodolfo Barón Castro, published in 1942, shows one of the first Statistical Census published by the Central Office of Migration in 1937; there it indicated that the four largest groups of immigrants in El Salvador, at that time, were made up of Spaniards, Palestinians, Italians and Germans. Germans arrived in the country in the early 1900s and, along with Italians, French and other Europeans, helped develop roads and build the Port of El Triunfo.

In addition, from the municipality of Berlín, Usulután there was a direct route to reach Puerto El Triunfo; an ideal route to transport the merchandise they produced and to obtain work materials.

It was the meeting point where German descendants and those close to Germany met to do their business because the farms were somewhat distant. They found in this part of El Salvador a center of excellence to live or develop, but they also needed to have a place to meet on weekends, to go and talk, which is typical of the cultures of these peoples: to have a meeting point.

The settlement was also agricultural. In 1958, the German Embassy in El Salvador founded the "Círculo Cultural Salvadoreño-Alemán", (German-Salvadoran cultural circle) to promote cultural exchange between Germany and El Salvador. The German School was dedicated on March 3, 1965, the Salvadoran German Cultural Forum has been celebrating every second Friday in November since 2006 Gardens of the Hilton Princess Hotel Oktoberfest. More than 700 people/families take part participate in a typically German dinner, German music and a typically German parade enjoy costumes. The traditional "Beer Festival" will continue thanks to the sponsorship of La Constancia and organized by German companies. The city of San Salvador, since 2011 in the third October week the Oktoberfest Pilsener celebrated in the exhibition and congress center. More than 27,000 people attended the 2013 edition, which became the largest Octoberfest in Central America. Over four days of festivities, participants enjoy traditional German cuisine and music, as well as a large selection of beers, some of which are made exclusively for the event.

Germany is one of the main European Union trading partners of El Salvador and is the largest importer of Salvadoran coffee. The Chamber of Commerce German-Salvadoran consists of around 85 companies. In addition to a German school in San Salvador.

==== Italian Salvadorans ====
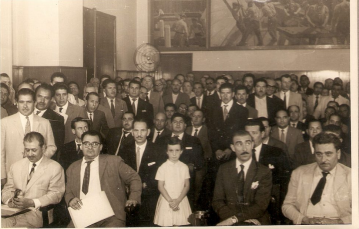
Massive documentation of Italian immigrants in San Salvador, during the 20th century

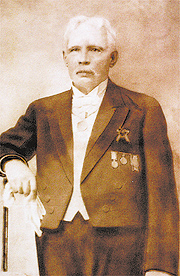
Juan Aberle, Italian-Salvadoran who composed the National Anthem of El Salvador

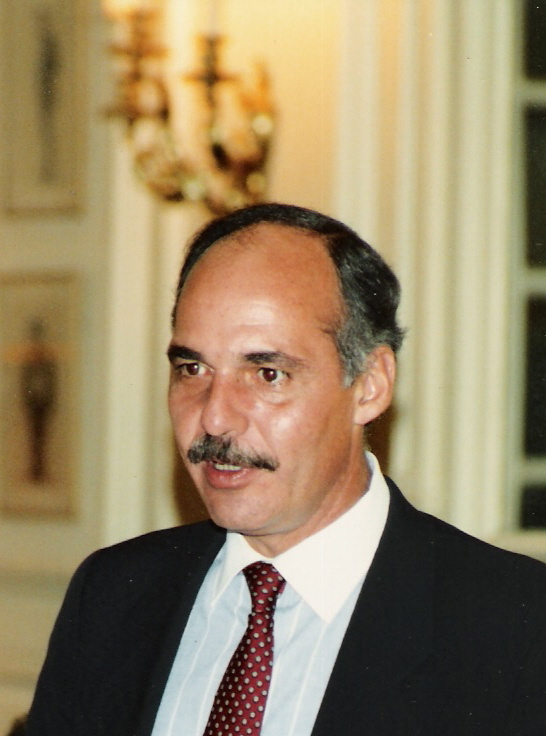
Alfredo Cristiani, former president of El Salvador, descendant of Italian immigrants

Italian Immigration in El Salvador refers to the movement of Italians to the Republic of El Salvador and one of the most historically important movements in El Salvador. The Italo-Salvadorans are one of the largest European communities in the country, and one of the largest in Central America and the Caribbean, as well as one of those with the greatest social and cultural weight in America.

During the mid-nineteenth century to the mid-twentieth century, waves of Italian immigrants from all regions of Italy were registered and arrived, mainly from northern Italy and southern Italy, the first Italians who arrived in the country were mainly from the Kingdom of Sardinia-Piedmont, and also from the Kingdom of the Two Sicilies, which include several Italians from different cities and provinces, since 1880, there has been a flow from all Italian regions but mainly from the south of the peninsula. highlighting regions such as Campania, Basilicata, Apulia and Sicily.

There is a record of Italians residing and arriving in the country since 1850, who came from the Kingdom of Sardinia-Piedmont and the Kingdom of the Two Sicilies, several intellectuals, merchants and other lower-middle class Italians stand out, during those years several boats arrived to the country mainly from important port cities of Italy, which include Naples, Genoa and Palermo, most of these Italians entered through the port of La Libertad and in the East of the country, during that time the Italians in the country did not exceed 2,000, however in the following years the number of arrivals would grow more.

By 1870, more boats arrived from Naples and Genoa, ranging from 30 to 60 Italian immigrants, but many merchants also entered the country every day. During that period of time, the country created very free immigration reforms, which attracted more immigrants from the world, many Italians arrived between 1876 and 1879, several boats to the country stand out, mainly from Campania and Liguria, between 1870 and 1879, it is estimated that more than 2,500 Italians entered the country, at that time El Salvador was the main receiver of Italians in Central America, mainly attracted by various agricultural opportunities. In 1880 to 1889, more than 2,000 Italians arrived in the country mainly from Campania and Piedmont, many boats of more than 100 Italian immigrants arrived at the Salvadoran coasts, these boats sailed from Naples and Liguria, this time was highlighted by arrivals of lower-class Italians and some professionals, however, also there were nuns and priests who came to the country to found several churches, schools and important organizations. In 1890, Italian immigration grew exponentially, it is estimated that between 1890 and 1899, more than 6,500 Italians arrived in the country, the vast majority arrived at the port of La Libertad, several architects and other Italian professionals arrived, such as those who built the Santa Ana Theater.

In 1890, many Salesians arrived in the country from Turin, they set sail on ships full of Italian immigrants and arrived at the port of La Libertad Department (El Salvador), many stayed in the city of Santa Tecla, El Salvador, where they founded various organizations and schools such as the Colegio Santa Cecilia, which It was founded in 1899 by Italians.

In 1898, the first Italian organization was founded in El Salvador and the first in Central America, the Sociedad de Asistencia y Beneficencia entre Italianos en El Salvador, better known as the Italian Assistenza, the objective of this organization is to help newly arrived Italians to get a job and help them financially while they got it.

===== Twentieth century =====
The time was characterized by the massive entry of Italians into the country, between 1900 and 1909 more than 10,000 Italians arrived in the country from all Italian regions, at that time, El Salvador was the second largest recipient of Italian immigrants in Central America, many seeking better opportunities for their businesses and improve their quality of life, where several merchants and Italians entering the country stand out, many standing out in areas such as Education, Music, Agriculture, Industry, Commerce and infrastructure.

Between 1910 and 1919, other thousands of Italians enter as they register more than 6,000 arrivals in the country, the Italians easily adapted to the country and more Italians arrived in the country every day, El Salvador at that time managed to reach the main recipient of Italians in Central America, between 1920 and 1929, several Italian merchants and professionals arrived, but also lower-class Italians, many set up their businesses, in 1930, Italian immigration was paralyzed for various reasons, between 1930 and 1939, it is estimated that more than 1,000 Italians They arrived in the country and many set up their businesses.

In 1940, due to the Second World War, a large migratory wave of thousands of Italians emigrating to the country begins, where several merchants and Italians who wanted to improve their quality of life stand out, this time was characterized by the entry of several refugees, and Italians, most of whom came from northern Italy.

Between 1960 and 1980, several Franciscans arrived in the country, many founded schools and organizations to help the Salvadoran people, and also to reactivate the Italian culture in the country.

In 1989 a son of Italians, Alfredo Cristiani, was elected President of El Salvador. After five difficult years, his term ended in 1994, leaving his nation stabilized from the civil war that had plagued it for 20 years.

Italian immigration to El Salvador was a very large movement that the country received, from 1850 to 1929, it is estimated that more than 32,000 Italians arrived in the small country, looking for job opportunities and improvements in their quality of life, but the migratory peak It was between 1880 and 1930, when thousands of Italians from all regions arrived in El Salvador, the main recipients of Italians in America were the United States, Argentina, Brazil, Uruguay and other countries in the region, although El Salvador received large amounts of Italian immigrants and at the American level is one that has had more weight socially and culturally.

===== Italian immigrants occupations and age =====
The Italians who arrived in the mid-nineteenth century were mostly middle class or poor, many were farmers and workers who came to the country to look for work, several merchants also arrived, according to some records, the Italians who arrived in the country between 1850 and 1870, were many families, who on average were between 22 and 26 years old, more 60% of immigrants who arrived in the country were men and 40% were women.

From 1870 to 1879, 2,5000 Italians arrived in the country, 63.5% were men, the average age was around 20 to 30 years and the majority were merchants, workers and farmers, between 1880 and 1889, they emigrated to the country around 2,000 Italians, 64% men and 44% women, age ranged widely, from 2 years to 50 years old, most were merchants, laborers and farmers, with increasing arrivals of priests, nuns and preachers. Between 1890 and 1891, the second highest peak was recorded, when 6,500 Italians entered El Salvador, the average age was around 20 to 30 years, and the most numerous occupations were merchants, workers, farmers, priests, nuns, teachers. and architects. The highest peak of Italian immigration in the country occurred between 1900 and 1909, when 10,000 Italians emigrated to the country looking for a better future, 60% were men and 40% women, and the average age was around 20 years. 30 years of age, the most numerous occupations were workers, merchants and some teachers, for 1910 to 1919, more than 6,000 Italians entered El Salvador, this year is distinguished by a growth of immigrants who are women with around 43% and 57% are men, the age varies between 3 years and 50 years, later, between 1920 and 1930, the majority who arrived in the country were engaged in commerce, agriculture and other businesses and activities.

===== Italian settlements in El Salvador =====
The first Italians who entered the country settled in Santa Ana and San Miguel. Others settled mainly in the east of the country, in San Miguel, Usulután and La Unión. In the north of the country, in Chalatenango, several groups of Italians also settled.

The southern Italians settled mainly in San Miguel, Santa Ana, San Salvador and other departments of the country, where several cities stand out. Santa Tecla was the one that received the greatest demographic weight due to Italian immigration, since it became the capital, they arrived various Italian communities.

The Lucanians, Campanians, Sicilians and Pulleses, had their main destinations in San Salvador, Santa Ana and San Miguel Department (El Salvador), while the northern Italians: the Piedmontese, Venetians, Ligurians and Lombards settled mainly in La Libertad, San Salvador, Chalatenango, Santa Ana and San Miguel. Several Italians settled in the department of Sonsonate, particularly from Castelnuovo di Conza in the Campania region, and Usulután received several Italian farmers from northern Italy, also in La Unión where several southerners and northerners settled, mainly Piedmontese and Calabrian. In the other departments of the country, minority but visible groups of Italians settled. succeeding in trade and agriculture.

=== Afro-Salvadorans ===
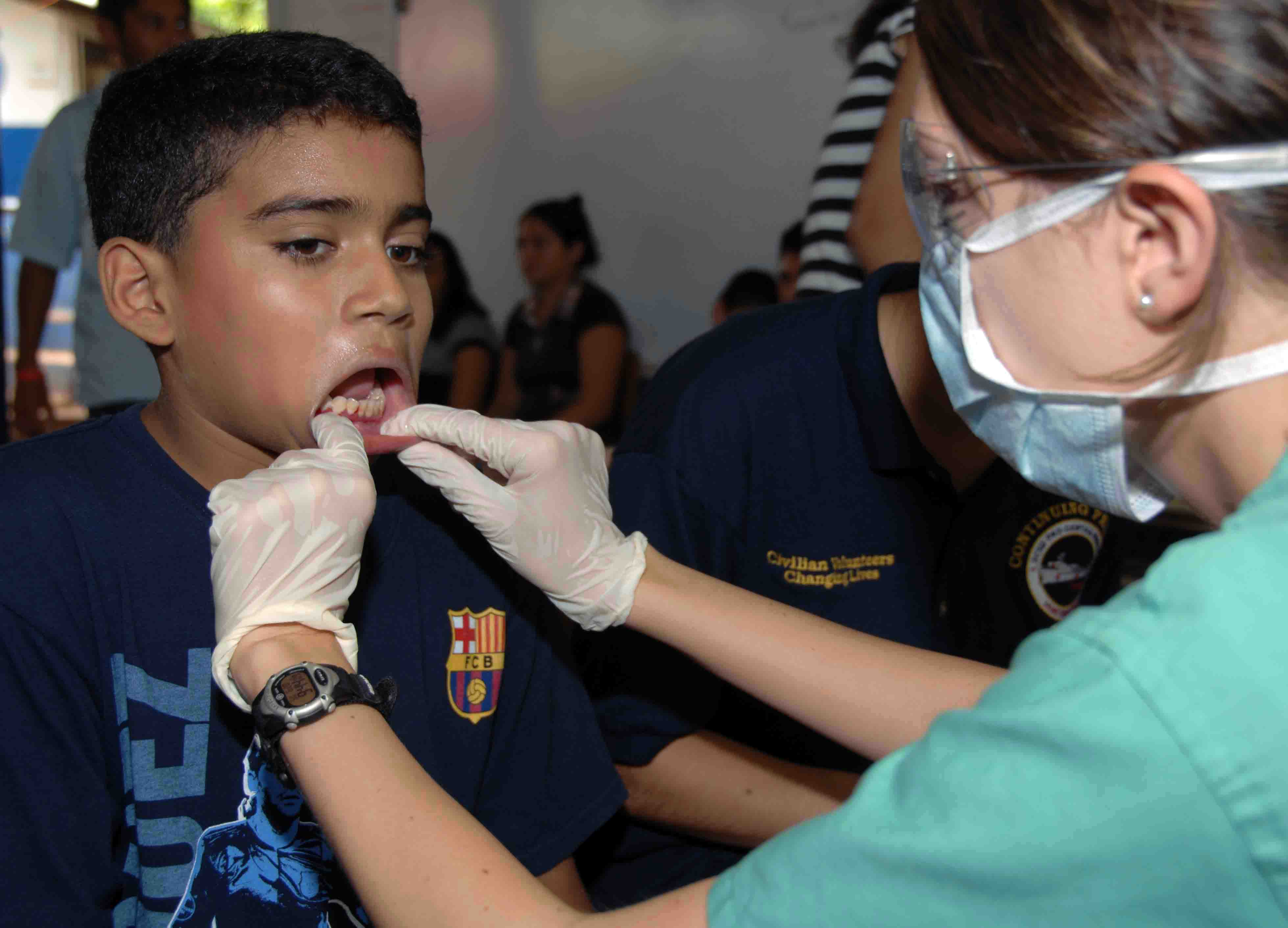
Salvadoran boy in La Unión, El Salvador

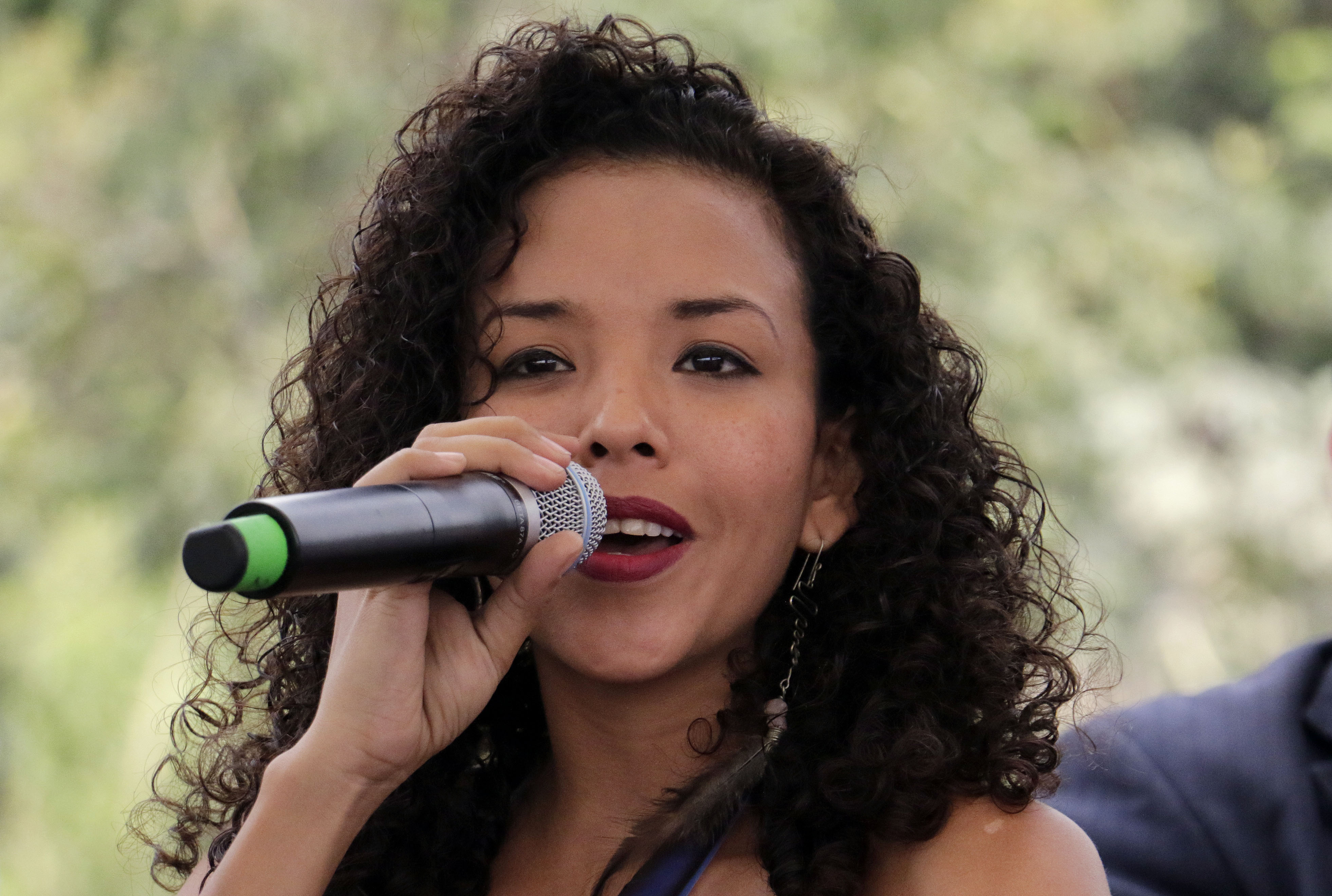
Salvadoran girl in San Salvador

Afro-Salvadorans, called Pardo and sometimes Afro-Mestizos in the colonial period, are the descendants of the African population that were enslaved and shipped to El Salvador to work in mines in specific regions of El Salvador. They have mixed into and were naturally bred out by the general Mestizo population, which is a combination of a Mestizo majority and the minority of African descendants, both of whom are racially mixed populations. Thus, there remains no significant extremes of African physiognomy among Salvadorans like there is in the other countries of Central America. A total of only 10,000 African slaves were brought to El Salvador over the span of 75 years, starting around 1548, about 25 years after El Salvador's colonization. El Salvador is the only country in Central America that does not have English Antillean (West Indian) or Garifuna populations of the Caribbean, but instead had older colonial African slaves that came straight from Africa. This is the reason why El Salvador is the only country in Central America not to have a caribbeanized culture, and instead preserved its classical Central America culture.

=== Jewish Salvadorans ===
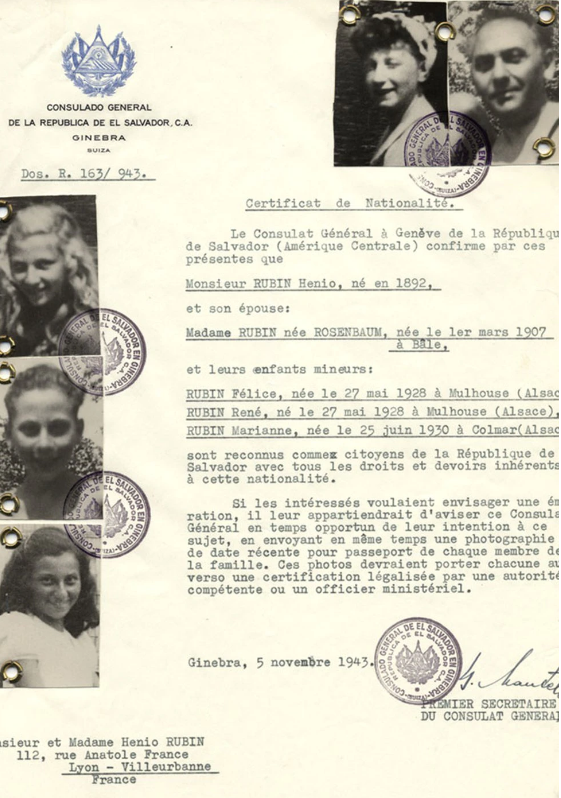
Representation of documents that were given to a Jewish family from Central Europe. Most of the Jews that came to El Salvador were from Germany, Poland, Hungary and Switzerland. 40,000 people were saved with Salvadoran citizenship documents like these, given by José Castellanos Contreras and José Gustavo Guerrero.

There is a small community of Jews who came to El Salvador from France, Germany, Morocco, Tunisia, and Turkey. Some Jews also arrived as World War II refugees.

Since colonial times, there is a record of Jews in Latin America, in El Salvador there is a record of several Jewish immigrations from Portugal, after the independence of El Salvador, it is believed that the first Jewish immigrant was Bernardo Haas, born in Alsace. Subsequently, the first documented German Jew arrived in the country in 1888, according to scholar Jessica Alpert. France and Central Europe were the main countries of origin of this contemporary Jewish migration, the majority were Ashkenazi and Sephardic, they stayed permanently in El Salvador.

The immigration laws of El Salvador were very free between 1821 and 1930, however they changed after 1930, but these strict laws culminated in 1940, during the Second World War several Ashkenazi Jewish refugees arrived mainly from Hungary, Germany, Poland, Switzerland, Slovakia and France, giving them several documents of Salvadoran nationality.

At present the Jewish community in El Salvador is quite small, however there are a considerable number of descendants and they have stood out in society, as are several businessmen and politicians of Jewish origin, such as Ernesto Muyshondt, Gabriela Rodríguez de Bukele and Bernard Lewinsky.

=== Gypsies in El Salvador ===
Romani people

The Gypsy caravans in El Salvador in the 20th century. The city of Santa Tecla, El Salvador was one of the places where there were Gypsy camps in El Salvador in the first decades of the 20th century. On May 7, 1926, newspapers from the city of San Miguel, El Salvador reported that within its urban area there was a nomadic community of Gypsies, who were also called Hungarians or Magyars (for Magyar or Hungary, an area from which they then belonged) believed that they were originally from), Gypsies or "peroleros", a designation due to the huge pots or pans that they always carried in their wagons and with which they prepared community meals between huge wood-fired stoves.

In 1929, the writer Francisco Miranda Ruano would remember "The tired Gypsies of that day" from his distant childhood and whose adventures opened his vocation as a writer. The propagation of theosophical, fascist and national socialist ideas among soldiers and civilians in El Salvador in the 1920s and 1930s created an adverse environment for the periodic arrival of the Gypsy people in El Salvador. The maximum expression of this mental and cultural closure occurred during the dictatorial government of Brigadier Maximiliano Hernández Martínez, issued the Law of Migration that prohibited the entry of Blacks, Arabs, Turks, Chinese and Gypsies into the country. This cause Gypsies in El Salvador to hide their identity.

The Romani Holocaust in Nazi Europe from 1935 to 1945, killed thousands of Gypsy people. Some of them were able to save themselves from that sad fate, thanks to the thousands of Salvadoran nationality certificates issued, in a clandestine operation, by the Salvadoran consul in Geneva, Colonel José Castellanos Contreras, José Gustavo Guerrero and his Transylvanian-Jewish secretary George Mandel-Mantello.

In the 1980s, the writer Claribel Alegría included the character "The Gypsy" in her novel Alice in the Land of Reality, which functioned as a rebellious and feminist conscience within the literary structure of the work. At the same time, it turned out be a tribute to the Gypsy caravans that once passed through Santa Ana, Sonsonate, Nahulingo, Usulután, Santiago de María, Chalatenango, San Miguel, La Unión and many towns, streets, cities and other local territories of El Salvador.

More than eight decades after such terrible racist legislation, the Romani language is no longer heard in Salvadoran territory. In the Romani language, the father of the family is called "Shero Rom", and it is theorized that it could be the origin of the Salvadoran word “Chero” to designate a friend.

=== Arab Salvadorans ===
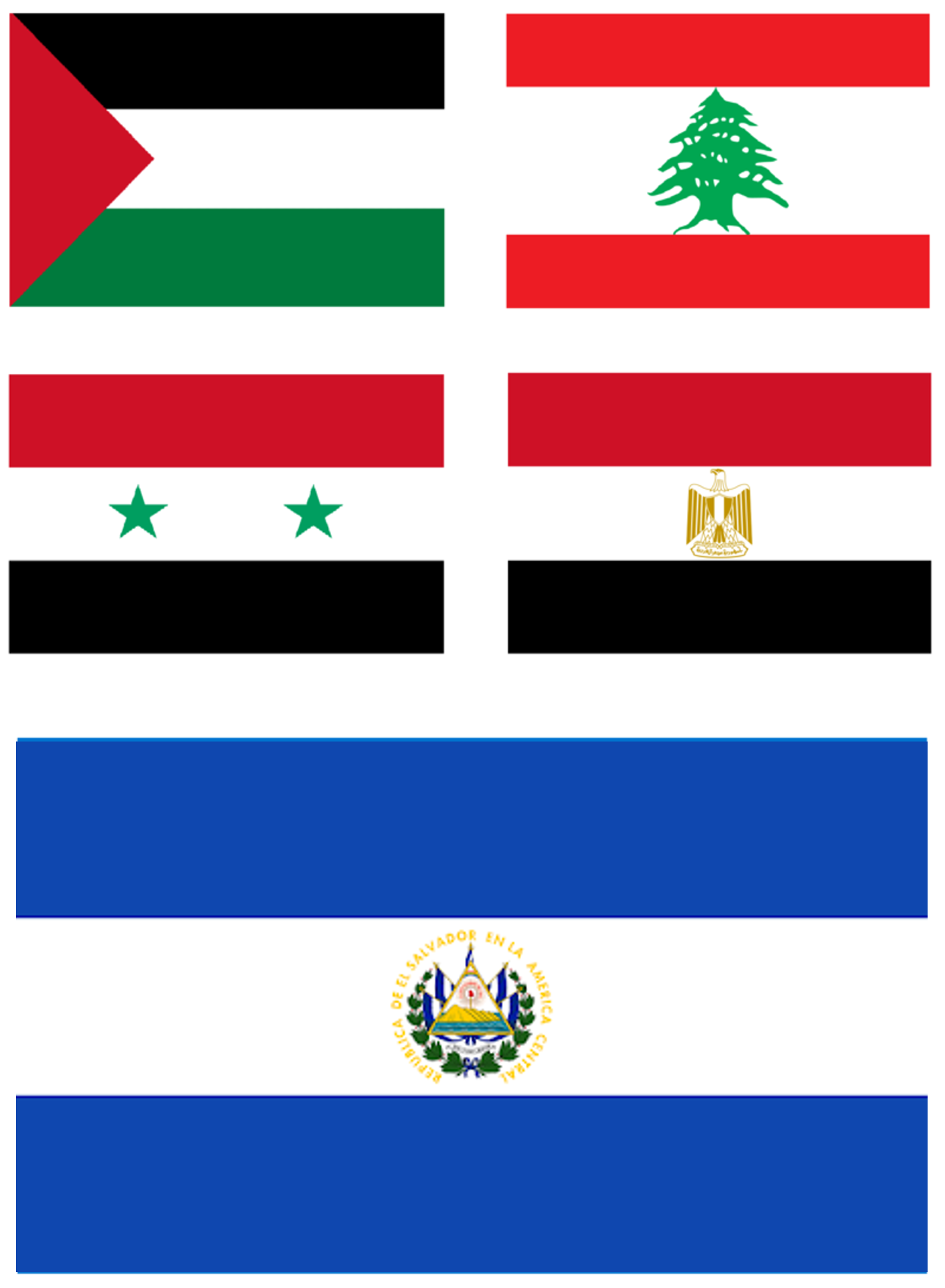
Arab Salvadorans include Palestinian Salvadoran, Lebanese Salvadoran, Syrian Salvadoran and Egyptian Salvadoran.

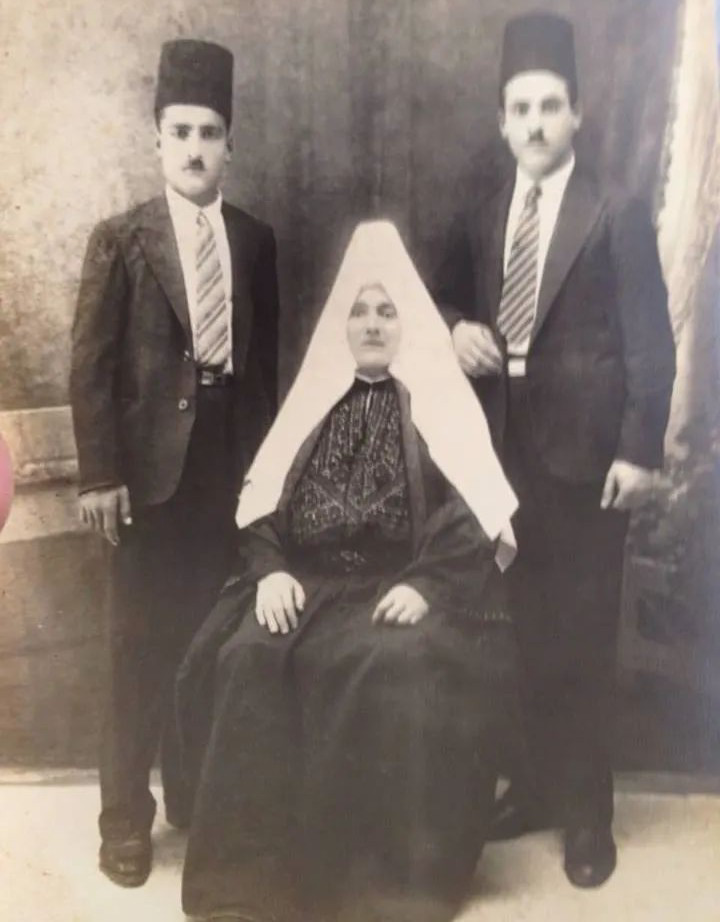
Manzue family from Bethlehem Palestine that arrived to El Salvador in 1910

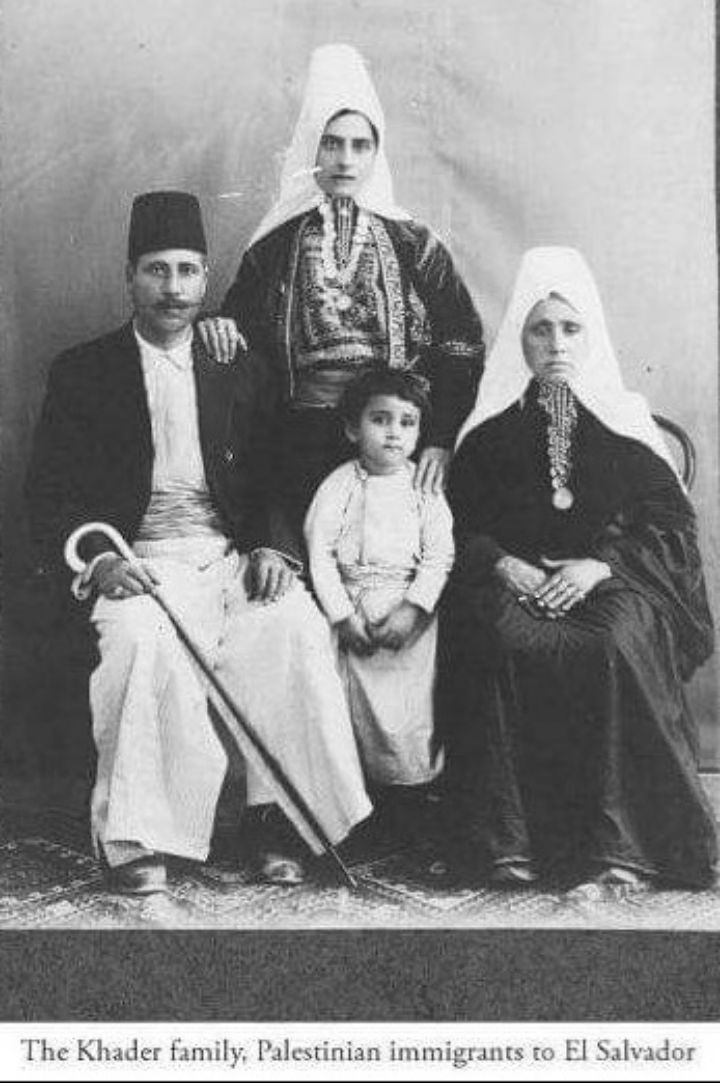
Khader (Cader) family migrated from Palestine to El Salvador, c. 1925.

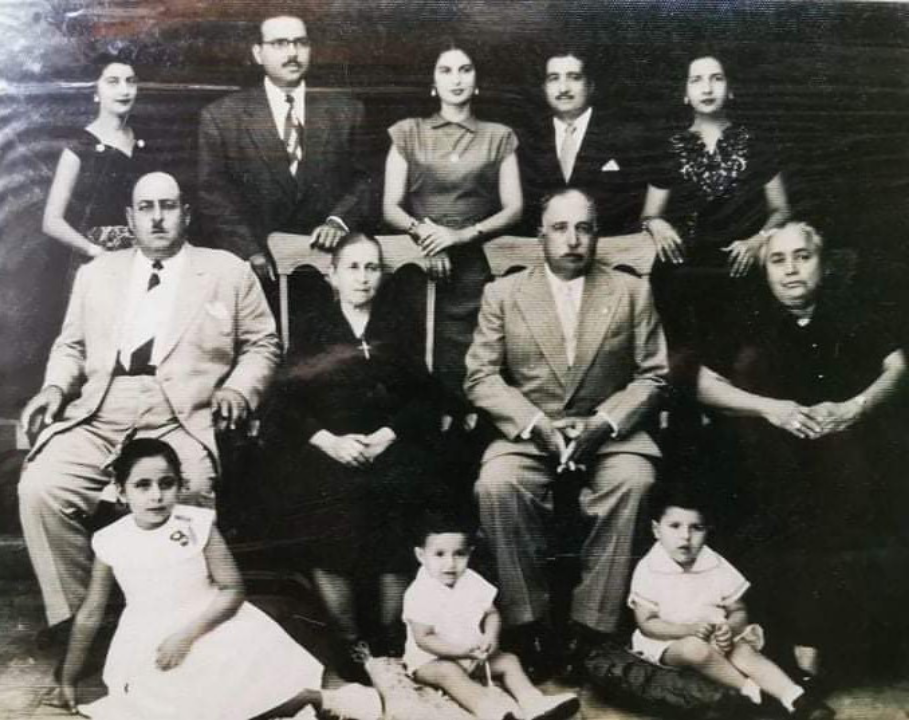
Palestinian family in Usulután El Salvador (1952)

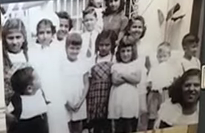
Palestinian children refugees in El Salvador

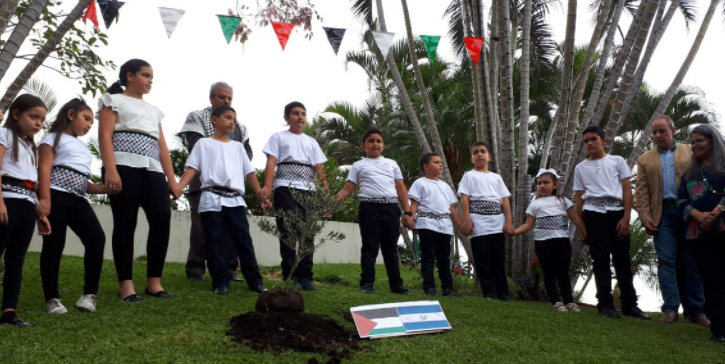
Children of Palestinian ancestry celebrating (Palestinian Day) at the Club Arabe Salvadoreño "Arab-Salvadoran Club"

There is a significant Arab Christian population (of about 100,000); mostly from Palestine (especially from the area of Bethlehem), but also from Lebanon. Salvadorans of Palestinian descent numbered around 70,000 individuals, while Salvadorans of Lebanese descent is around 25,000.

The history of the Arabs in El Salvador dates back to the end of the 19th century, when religious clashes in the Ottoman Empire induced many Palestinians, Lebanese, Egyptians, Tunisians, Algerians, Iraqis, Omani, Saudis and Syrians to leave the land where they were born and travel to El Salvador in search of a place where they could live in relative peace. For similar reasons Turkish people and Persian Christians from Turkey, Iran and Afghanistan also arrived to El Salvador around the same time. There were also economic factors that contributed to immigration from the Middle East; many immigrants felt they could achieve success abroad on a level they couldn't in their native lands.

The first wave of Arab migration to El Salvador began between 1880 and 1920, amidst a large scale influx of immigrants to the country. These Arabs settled in the cities of San Salvador, San Miguel, Santa Ana, Santa Tecla, Usulutan and La Union. The population of El Salvador increased from 482,400 in 1879 to 1,168,000 in 1920, with immigration, including immigration from the late Ottoman Empire, substantially driving growth.

Arab immigration in El Salvador began at the end of the 19th century in the wake of the repressive policies applied by the Ottoman Empire against Maronite Catholics. Several of the destinations that the Lebanese chose at that time were in countries of the Americas, including El Salvador. This resulted in the Arab diaspora residents being characterized by forging in devoutly Christian families and very attached to their beliefs, because in these countries they can exercise their faith without fear of persecution, which resulted in the rise of Lebanese-Salvadoran, Syrian-Salvadoran and Palestinian-Salvadoran communities in El Salvador.

Currently, the Palestinian community forms the largest Arab diaspora population in El Salvador, with 70,000 direct descendants, followed by the Lebanese community with more than 27,000 direct descendants. Both are almost entirely composed of Catholic and Orthodox Christians. The slaughter of Lebanese and Palestinian Arab Christians at the hands of Muslims initiated the first Arab migrations to El Salvador.

Inter-ethnic marriage in the Lebanese community with Salvadorans, regardless of religious affiliation, is very high; most have only one father with Lebanese nationality and mother of Salvadoran nationality. As a result, some of them speak Arabic fluently. But most, especially among younger generations, speak Spanish as a first language and Arabic as a second.

During the war between Israel and Lebanon in 1948 and during the Six-Day War, thousands of Lebanese left their country and went to El Salvador. Many arrived at La Libertad, where they comprised half of the economic activity of immigrants.

Lebanon had been an iqta of the Ottoman Empire. Although the imperial administration, whose official religion was Islam, guaranteed freedom of worship for non-Muslim communities, and Lebanon in particular had a semi-autonomous status, the situation for practitioners of the Maronite Catholic Church was complicated, since they had to cancel exaggerated taxes and suffered limitations for their culture. These tensions were expressed in a rebellion in 1821 and a war against the Druze in 1860. The hostile climate caused many Lebanese to sell their property and take ships in the ports of Sidon, Beirut and Tripoli heading for the Americas.

Arab-Salvadoreans and their descendants have traditionally played an outsized role in El Salvador's economic and political life, with many becoming business leaders and noteworthy political figures, such as Nayib Bukele.

In 1939, the Arab community based in San Salvador organized and founded the "Arab Youth Union Society"

== Emigration ==
The migration rate accelerated during the period of 1979 to 1981, this marked the beginning of the civil unrest and the spread of political killings. The total impact of civil wars, dictatorships and socioeconomics drove over a million Salvadorans (both as immigrants and refugees) into the United States; Guatemala is the second country that hosts more Salvadorans behind the United States, approximately 110,000 Salvadorans according to the national census of 2010. in addition small Salvadoran communities sprung up in Canada, Australia, Belize, Panama, Costa Rica, Italy, Taiwan and Sweden since the migration trend began in the early 1970s. The 2010 U.S. census counted 1,648,968 Salvadorans in the United States, up from 655,165 in 2000.

== See also ==
- El Salvador
- Ethnic groups in Central America
- History of the Jews in El Salvador
- Salvadoran Departments by HDI
- Catholic Church in El Salvador
- Central America
- Culture of El Salvador
- German Salvadoran
- Geography of El Salvador
- Italian Salvadorans
- Monumento al Divino Salvador del Mundo
- Music of El Salvador
- Palestinian Salvadoran
- Religion in El Salvador
- Salvadorans
- Salvadoran Americans
- Salvadoran cuisine
- Salvadoran Spanish
- San Salvador
- Swiss Salvadorans
