= Religion in El Salvador =

Religion in El Salvador (2025 estimate)
1. Catholicism (42.7%)
2. Protestantism (35.6%)
3. Others (2.50%)
4. No religion (19.2%)

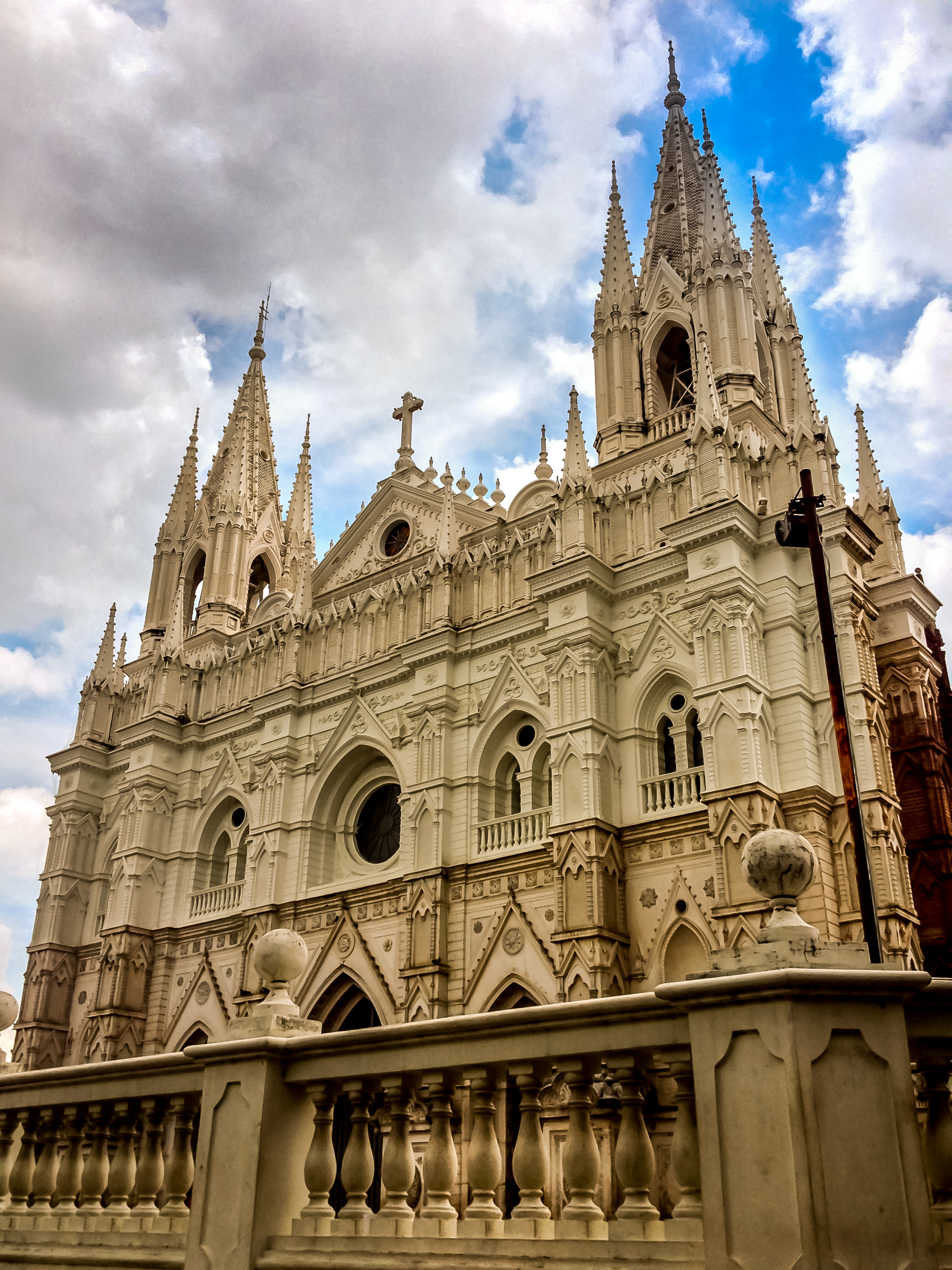
St. Anne's Cathedral in Santa Ana.

Christianity is the predominant religion in El Salvador, with Catholicism and Evangelicalism being its main denominations. The Catholic share of the population is on decline while Protestants are experiencing rapid growth in recent decades.

In 1528 Spanish, after the foundation of San Salvador village by the Conquistador Diego de Alvarado, part of the territory of modern day El Salvador was named after Jesus Christ - San Salvador (lit. "Holy Savior"), that from 1579 also including the province of San Miguel; and the other part, from 1556, was named Holy Trinity of Sonsonate; both jurisdictions joined in 1824 in El Salvador, or Salvador, during the post-Federal Republic period and subsequently settled on as El Salvador.

El Salvador is a secular country and the freedom of religion is enshrined in the nation's constitution. However, the constitution grants automatic official recognition to the Catholic Church and requires other religious groups to apply for official recognition through registration.

== Religious affiliation ==
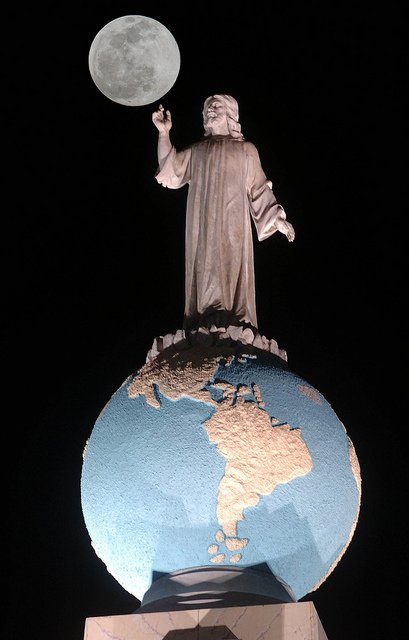
The iconic Jesus statue Monumento al Divino Salvador del Mundo, a landmark located in the country's capital, San Salvador.

According to the World Religion Database 2020, 96.68% of the population has a Christian background and 2.57% is non-religious (atheist or agnostic); 0.57% follow ethnic religions.

There is some debate about percentages. The Institute of Public Opinion of the University of Central America in May 2017 found 47.5% of the population as Catholics, and 35.1% as Protestant, 14.5% as not having a religion and the remainder (about 3%) being Jehovah's Witnesses, ISKON, Muslims, Jews, Baháʼís, Buddhists, Latter-day Saints, and members of indigenous religions. However, Latinobarómetro in 2017 found 39% were Catholic, 28% Protestant, 30% atheist/agnostic/not religious, 2% other religions, and 1% did not answer. It also found in 1996 that 67% of the population considered themselves Catholic and 15% Protestant. A 2023 survey by M&R Consultores found that 43.5% of the population was affiliated with Protestantism, 36.2% with Catholicism and 19.3% with no religion.

== Christianity ==
=== Protestantism and other Christian denominations ===
Mision Cristiana Elim Internacional is a large pentecostal denomination started in El Salvador. It claims that its main church in San Salvador has 120,000 attending. The Assemblies of God claim 285,226 members (2007).

The Anglican Church in El Salvador (a diocese of the province of the Anglican Church in Central America) claims 6,000 members in 18 congregations. The Baptist Association of El Salvador claims 4,427 members and the Salvadorean Lutheran Synod about 15,000 in 68 congregations.

The Church of Jesus Christ of Latter-day Saints, a Restorationist Christian denomination, claims 130,000 people in 164 congregations as of 2023), or about 2% of the population, and has 1 temple in San Salvador. Latter-Day Saints began evangelizing in El Salvador in 1951.

== Religious freedom ==
The constitution of El Salvador provides for the freedom of religion and prohibits religious discrimination. Publicly offending others' religious beliefs or damaging religious objects is punishable by imprisonment. Members of the clergy may not hold senior government positions, and are forbidden from joining political parties.

Religious groups may register with the government for the purposes of tax-exemption and acquiring building permits. Special visas are required for individuals who wish to travel to El Salvador to engage in proselytizing.

Public school education is secular. Private schools may include religious content in their curricula, but do not receive government support. Since 2016, clergy have limited access to prisons, due to concerns that some members of the clergy were using prison visits to smuggle items into prisons.

In 2023, the country was scored 3 out of 4 for religious freedom by Freedom House, a US government funded think tank.

== See also ==
- Demographics of El Salvador
- The Church of Jesus Christ of Latter-day Saints in El Salvador
- Islam in El Salvador
- Judaism in El Salvador
