= Daniel Guttfreund =

Salvadoran clinical psychologist and researcher

Daniel Georg Guttfreund Schneider
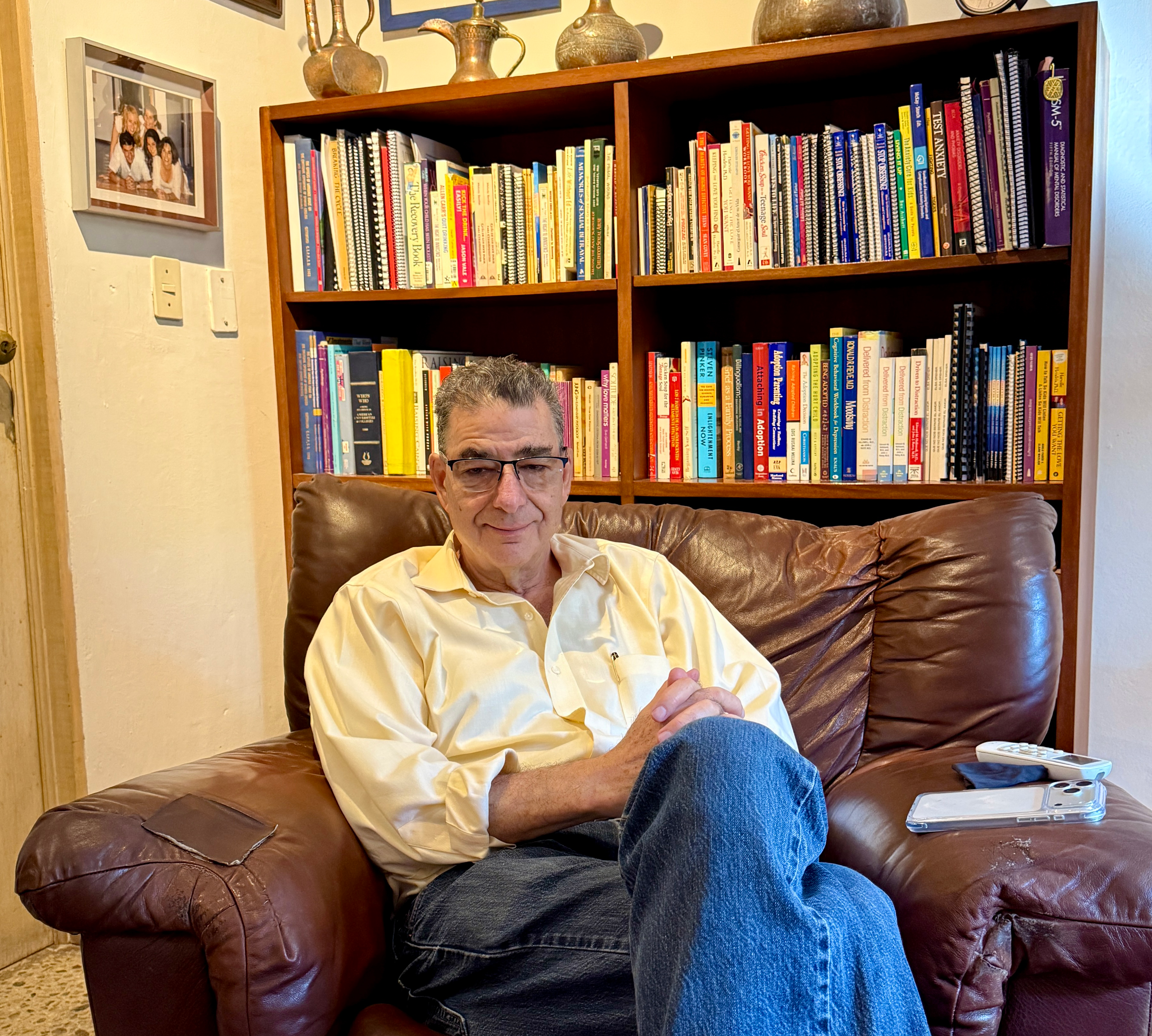
- Born: March 23, 1962 (age 64); San Salvador, El Salvador
- Occupations: Clinical psychologist, academic, social entrepreneur
- Known for: Co-founder of Tin Marín Children's Museum

Daniel Georg Guttfreund Schneider (born March 23, 1962) is a Salvadoran clinical psychologist, academic, and researcher, best known for his work in clinical psychology, bilingual emotional processing, and mental health education. His professional career spans clinical practice, academic teaching, and scientific research focused on psychological well-being and child protection. Guttfreund has also contributed to social development initiatives in El Salvador and is a founder of the Tin Marín Children's Museum, the country's first interactive museum for children.

== Early life and education ==
Guttfreund was born in San Salvador, son of Enrique and Gertrud Guttfreund. His father emigrated from Germany in 1932 to escape the Nazi regime, and his mother fled to Brazil, where they met before settling in El Salvador. Enrique Guttfreund became a distinguished businessman and diplomat, serving as the Ambassador of El Salvador to Israel.

Daniel is the youngest of five children. He attended the American School of San Salvador, where he graduated in 1979. That same year, he moved to Jerusalem, Israel, to study sociology and social anthropology at the Hebrew University of Jerusalem, where he earned his bachelor's degree. He later moved to California, United States, and completed his Ph.D. in Clinical Psychology at the California School of Professional Psychology in San Diego, graduating with honors in 1988.

During his doctoral studies, he met Lisa Guttfreund, whom he married in October 1988. The couple has three daughters and has lived in California, Jerusalem, and El Salvador.

== Academic and professional career ==
In 1986, he was included in the compendium Who's Who Among Students in American Universities and Colleges. His doctoral thesis, Effects of language usage on the emotional experience of Spanish-English and English-Spanish bilinguals, was later published in the Journal of Consulting and Clinical Psychology in 1990.

After earning his doctorate, he returned to Israel, where he worked at the Hebrew University Counseling Center as an adjunct lecturer and was recognized by students as an Outstanding Speaker. During this period, he also developed the interactive board game Yad al Ha Lev, later commercialized by Orda Industries Ltd.

== Work in El Salvador and social impact ==
After returning to El Salvador, Guttfreund established his private clinical psychology practice and became one of the founding members of the Tin Marín Children's Museum The museum receives more than 226,000 visitors annually and has developed over 30 educational exhibits, including My Body Belongs to Me, the first in the country dedicated to preventing child sexual abuse.

In a focused social effort, he created the educational game Diverti to raise funds for the museum.

In 2017, he managed a $250,000 grant in strategic coordination with USAID and (El Salvador)|Banco Agrícola to install a solar energy system that transformed the museum into an environmentally sustainable space.

He also collaborates as an official mental health provider for the Peace Corps and the Embassy of the United States, San Salvador.

== Cultural and scientific promotion ==
A dedicated chess advocate, Guttfreund has championed the game as an educational resource by arranging visits from prominent grandmasters, including Nigel Short, Loek van Wely, and Garry Kasparov.

He has also organized and been a host of international mental health conferences in El Salvador, inviting specialists such as Edward Hallowell and Eric Storch.

== Publications ==
- Trompeter, N., Johnco, C., Zepeda-Burgos, R., Schneider, S. C., Cepeda, S. L., La Buissonnière-Ariza, V., Guttfreund, D., & Storch, E. A. (2020). "Mental health literacy and stigma among Salvadorian youth, anxiety, depression and obsessive-compulsive related disorders." Child Psychiatry & Human Development.
- Novoa, J. C., Schneider, S. C., Lastra, A., Hurtado, A., Katz, C. L., & Storch, E. A. (2019). "Parents' Knowledge, Attitudes, and Experiences in Child Sexual Abuse Prevention in El Salvador." Child Psychiatry and Human Development.
- Selles, R. R., Nelson, R., Zepeda, R., Dane, B. F., Wu, M. S., Novoa, J. C., Guttfreund, D., & Storch, E. A. (2015). "Body focused repetitive behaviors among Salvadorian youth: Incidence and clinical correlates."
- Selles, R. R., Zepeda, R., Dane, B. F., Novoa, J. C., Guttfreund, D., Nelson, R., & Storch, E. A. (2015, January 31). "Parental Perceptions of Mental Health Care for Children in El Salvador."
- Hurtado, A., Katzabo, C., Ciroad, D., & Guttfreund, D. (2013, October). "Teachers' knowledge, attitudes, and experience in sexual abuse prevention education in El Salvador." Journal of Global Public Health.
- Guttfreund, D. G., Cohen, O., & Yerushalmi, H. (1992, In press). "Israeli psychotherapists' reactions and perceptions on the process of psychotherapy during the Gulf War." Psychotherapy.
