= Berlín, El Salvador =

Berlín
- Municipality
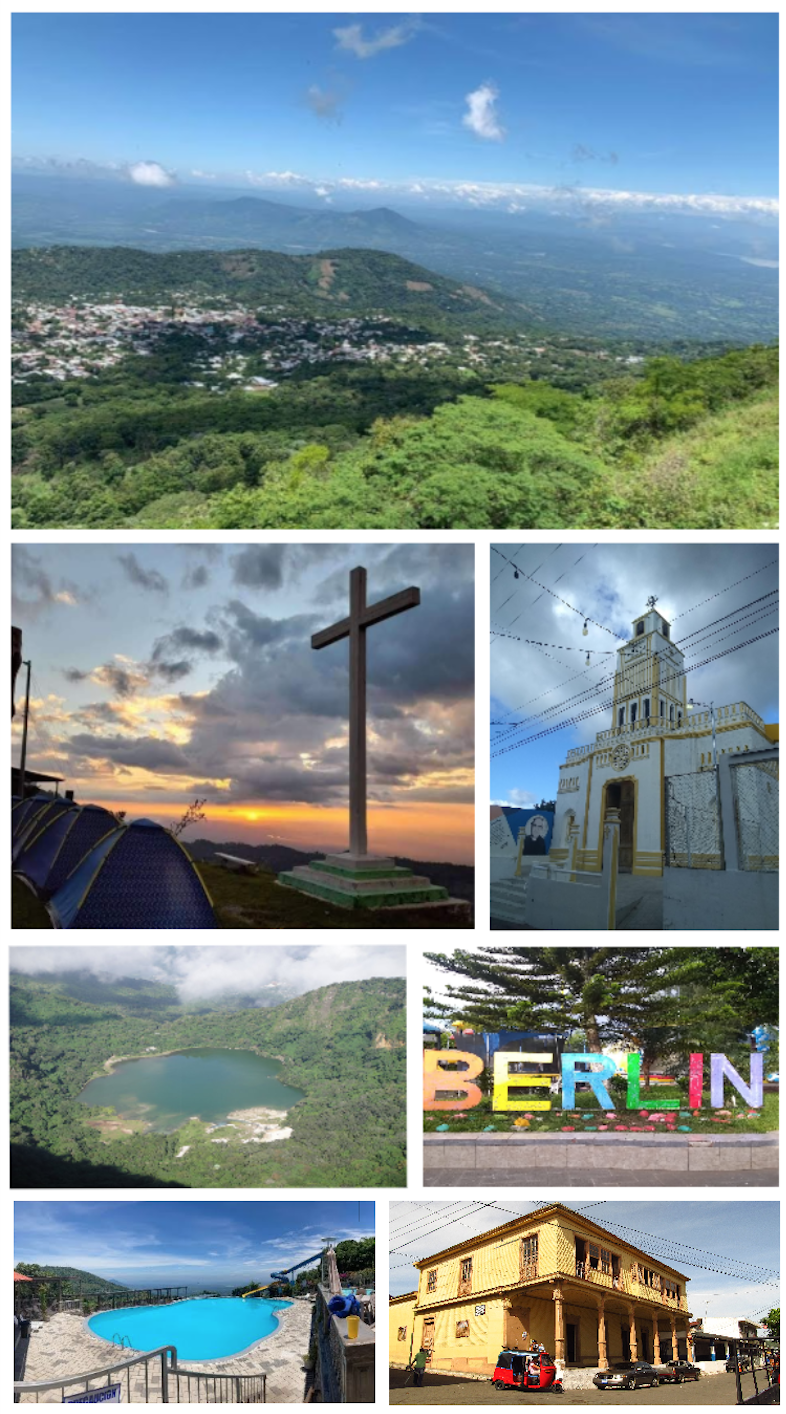
- From left to right, top to bottom: Skyline of Berlín, Cerro La Cruz Viewpoint, Catholic Church of Berlín, Laguna de Alegría, Berlín Central Park, Berlín Pool Party, Historical Center of Berlín

- Flag
- Motto: Ciudad de Frescos Cafetales "City of Fresh Coffee Plantations"
- Location in El Salvador
- Coordinates: 13°30′N 88°32′W
- Country: El Salvador
- Department: Usulután Department
- Founded: 1885
- Named after: Berlin, Germany

Government
  - Mayor: Andrés Elías Monterrosa Palacios; Nuevas Ideas

Area
  - Total: 146.96 km^{2} (56.74 sq mi)

Population (2024)
  - Total: 20,683
  - Density: 121/km^{2} (310/sq mi)
- Time zone: UTC6 (Central Standard Time)
- Area code: +503
- Website: berlinelsalvador.com/

Berlín is a municipality in the Usulután Department, in El Salvador. The municipality is also one of the four capital districts of the department. It is located at the east of El Salvador, 112 kilometers from the capital city San Salvador. The municipality of Berlín is situated in the Tecapa-Chinameca-Alegrìa mountain zone, located in the central-north of Usulután.

Founded in 1885 as Berlín, by the residents of the previous "Gramalón" or "Agua Caliente" and by a German known as Serafin Brennen, who has arrived to establish the municipality, after surviving a shipwreck off the Salvadoran coast.

== Name ==
The name of Berlín came from Serafín Brennen, a German citizen who landed on the Salvadoran coast after surviving a shipwreck. He travelled to the Agua Caliente village which is now Berlín, and made an agreement with the residents to rename the village after Berlin, which is now the capital of Germany. This is also why the flag is an almost replicated copy of the Flag of Germany.

== History ==
=== Pre-Columbian era ===
It is assumed that city used to be the place where Lencas lived, which settled in large numbers due to plenty of resources in the area. Later, the Pipils arrived from the north and entered what is now the city of Berlín, crating cultural and linguistic influence to the area.

=== Spanish colonial period ===
From 1500 and onwards, Usulután was owned by San Salvador, including the area where Berlín would be established. In this period of time, agriculture production was not just for the common good but for the Ladinos as well. The population became wealthy with crops in the 16th and 17th centuries. Indigo was a more profitable crop than cocoa, but it also was harmful to the population of the area.

=== Republican era ===
President Dr. Rafael Zaldívar ruled many laws on February 26, 1881. Ejido communal lands remain in the hands of a few owners. The events led to mass coffee production, eventually replacing indigo. The Agua Caliente valley contains suitable land for coffee cultivation. This is due to it being located on the western slope of the Alegría Volcano. Large farms were created to create large productions of coffee. All of this has allowed Berlín to become a vital supply of coffee.

=== Salvadoran Civil War ===
During the Salvadoran Civil War, Berlín became one of the most affected municipalities of the Salvadoran Civil War. However, it was the beginning of February 1983 where violent combat happened that ended with guerrillas entering the city. This made it become the most important city taken over by guerrillas since the beginning of the Salvadoran Civil War.

On January 30, 1983, FMLN guerrillas entered Berlín and overthrew the municipality after several days of combat with government forces. Since stealing the municipality was a way to demonstrate strength, the guerrilla presence was short. This caused them to withdraw only 5 days later.

After the guerillas gained ownership of the city, the Salvadoran military mobilized many soldiers from the battlefronts of the Morazán department to this city to attempt to regain control of Berlín. This gave a large turn in the civil war, since it was observed that many combats were now not just limited to the mountainous areas of Morazán, but also to important cities. Battles in a city considered of great importance, due to it being located in an economically wealthy region, generated greater news impacts internationally and political concern in the Salvadoran Government and in the United States.

In that week, the Salvadoran military and American military advisors were astonished by the guerrillas' ability to initiate attacks of such importance and input such power in an area that, until that date, was far from the epicenter of operations. In that week of conflict, half of the population of Berlín at the time evacuated the municipality. At least five blocks of the city center were completely destroyed. There are 13 places in Berlín that still have relics of the incident. An estimated 27 government forces and 258 civilians has been killed during the conflicts.

== Economy ==
Berlín has depended on coffee since its foundation. Most of the territory surrounding the city is coffee farms. The highlands of Berlín lend themselves to this crop, which is typical of high-altitude lands. In the rural parts of Berlín, there is subsistence agriculture (minimal production only to supply the needs of a farmer and their family) consisting of corn and beans. When there is a surplus production of basic grains (corn and beans), it is marketed mainly in the urban area of Berlín. The production of minor species such as poultry is also oriented for self-consumption and on a smaller scale for sales. Some sources tell that a possible introduction for coffee in El Salvador occurred between 1800 and 1815 in the Ahuachapán Department, where it then spread throughout the nation.

In 1857, the creation of coffee plantations appeared in the surroundings of Santa Ana, Ahuachapán and Sonsonate. The first statistics for coffee farming were created by the Governor of Santaneco in 1861. It read that there were 1.6 million coffee trees in nurseries, 690 thousand plants newly planted in the field and 600 thousand coffee trees in production. Afterwards, cultivation was started in the west of San Vicente, in the Usulután Mountain Range and in the Chaparrastique volcano in San Miguel.

The cultivation of coffee led to economic development in the municipality. Road communication was upgraded, due to the importance of transporting the product and high labor activity. The coffee harvesting period runs from October to January, which requires large amounts of labor. Coffee plantations also generate work at other times of the year, in which it is necessary to maintain the crops. This allowed the majority Berlín to subsist in the coffee industry. Since the owners of the farms, among whom was the Meardi family, which became one of the famous fourteen families of El Salvador with more than 3,600 apples cultivated needed large amounts of labor. During harvest time, entire families were hired in these tasks and allowed all family members to generate extra income for the household economy.

Lack of labor and income in municipalities with coffee-based economies led to economic, social and environmental consequences. This caused abandonment of farms, loss of professions, and less tax revenue to municipalities and departments.

According to the VII Economic Census carried out by the General Directorate of Statistics and Censuses (DIGESTYC), which excludes the primary sector for census purposes, economic activities, not including agricultural and agricultural activities (in the case of Berlín) are supported by 11.70% in industrial companies, 76.42% in commercial companies, 9.88% in service companies and 2.00% in construction and transportation companies. This census does not consider, as mentioned before, the activities of the primary sector (Agriculture and farming) which in the case of Berlín, are the main economic base of the population. Furthermore, due to jurisdictional issues, it does not take into account the electricity generator La Geo, which contributes to the employment and economic development of the municipality. This electric company generates electricity from geothermal exploitation. The generation project began between 1976 and 1981 and has an installed generation capacity of 66 megawatts.

Berlín uses its history of coffee as a large part of its tourism. It also uses its architecture, which includes old houses with die-cut sheet walls imported from Belgium. This type of construction occurred between 1925 and 1930 in approximately 40% of the buildings. These structures represent the history of Berlín.

== Landmarks ==
The most popular landmarks in Berlín are the center park, which includes the Catholic church of San José built in 1897 and remodeled in 1947, and the different old houses. There are also parts of the Berlín that were devastated by combats that occurred throughout January to February 1983, during Salvadoran Civil War.
