= Potonico =

District in Chalatenango Department, El Salvador

- District
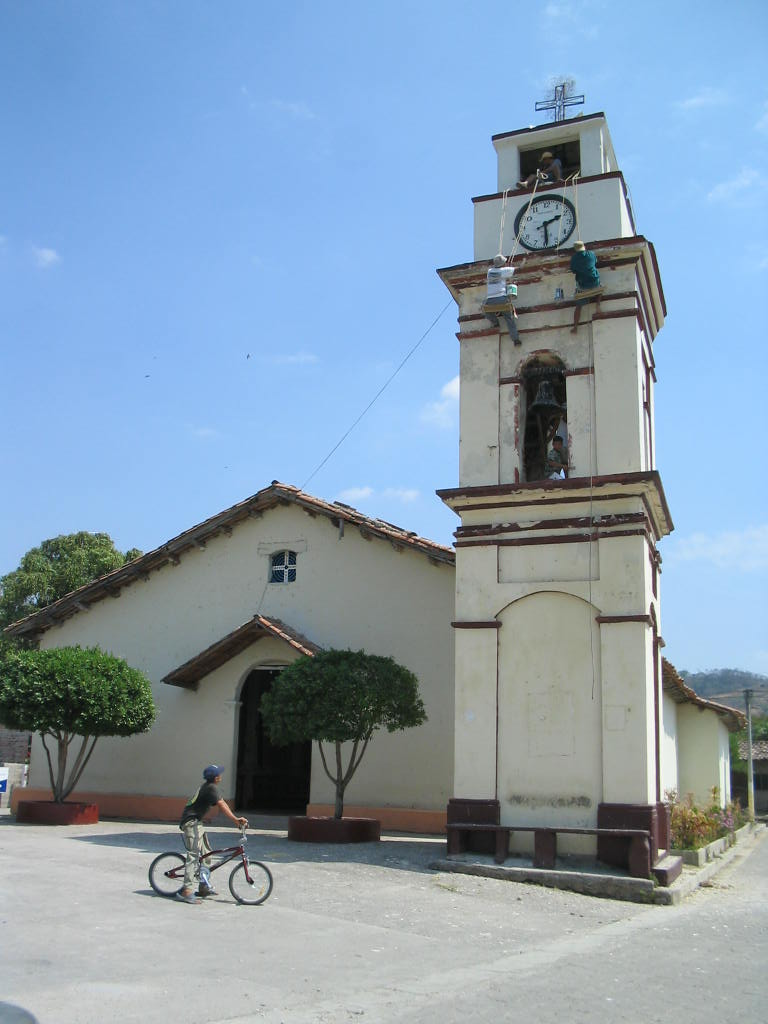
- The church of Potonico

- Location of Potonico within El Salvador

- Location in El Salvador
- Coordinates: 13°58′N 88°54′W
- Country: El Salvador
- Department: Chalatenango
- Municipality: Chalatenango Sur

Government
  - Type: Mayoralty
  - Mayor: Milton Serrano

Area
  - District: 14.57 sq mi (37.73 km^{2})
- Elevation: 856 ft (261 m)

Population (2024)
  - District: 1,766
  - Rank: 251st in El Salvador
  - Density: 108.9/sq mi (42.04/km^{2})
  - Rural: 1,766
- Time zone: UTC-6

Potonico is a district in the municipality of Chalatenango Sur in the Chalatenango Department of El Salvador. Potonico is limited to the north by San Miguel de Mercedes, to the northwest by San Antonio Los Ranchos, to the east by San José Cancasque, to the southeast by Jutiapa, to the south and southwest by Cinquera, to the west and northwest by San Luis del Carmen. It's 44 km away from the national capital of San Salvador. The district covers an area of 37.73 km² and the centre has an altitude of 260 m above sea level.

The toponym Potonico comes from the potón language and means "The Stone of Language" from Potoni=language, Co=stone.
