= San José Las Flores =

San José Las Flores may refer to several places:

- San José Las Flores, Chalatenango, El Salvador
- San José Las Flores, Santa Ana, El Salvador
