= Chalatenango, El Salvador =

Capital of the Salvadoran department of Chalatenango

Chalatenango
- District
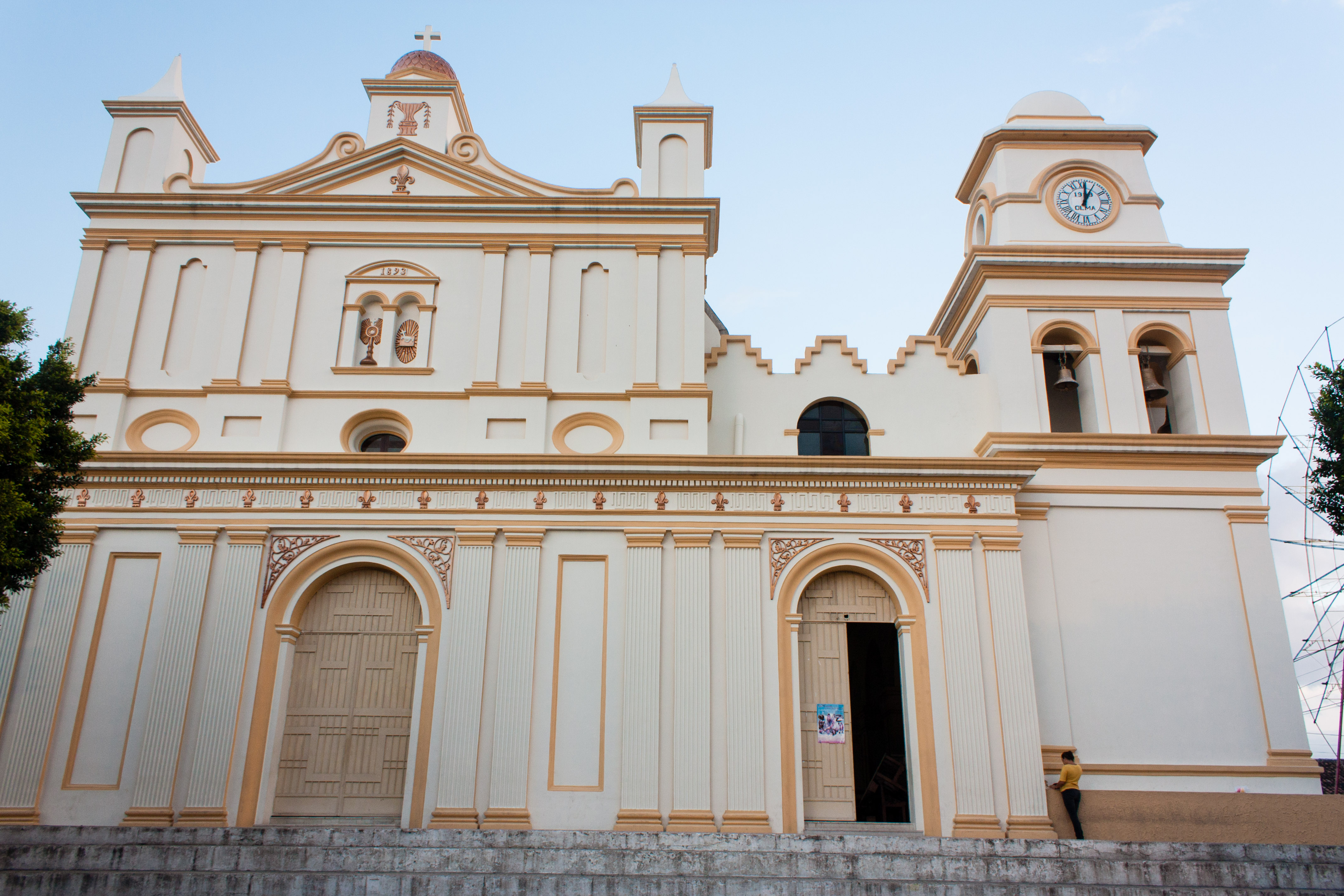
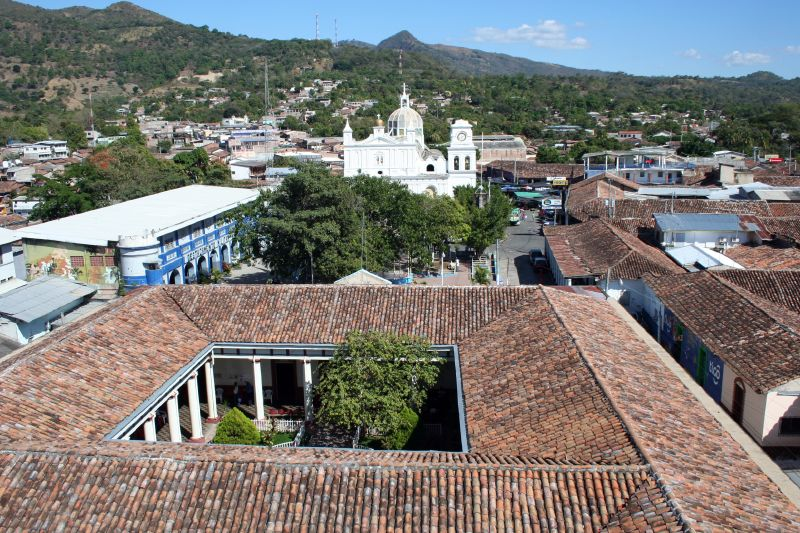
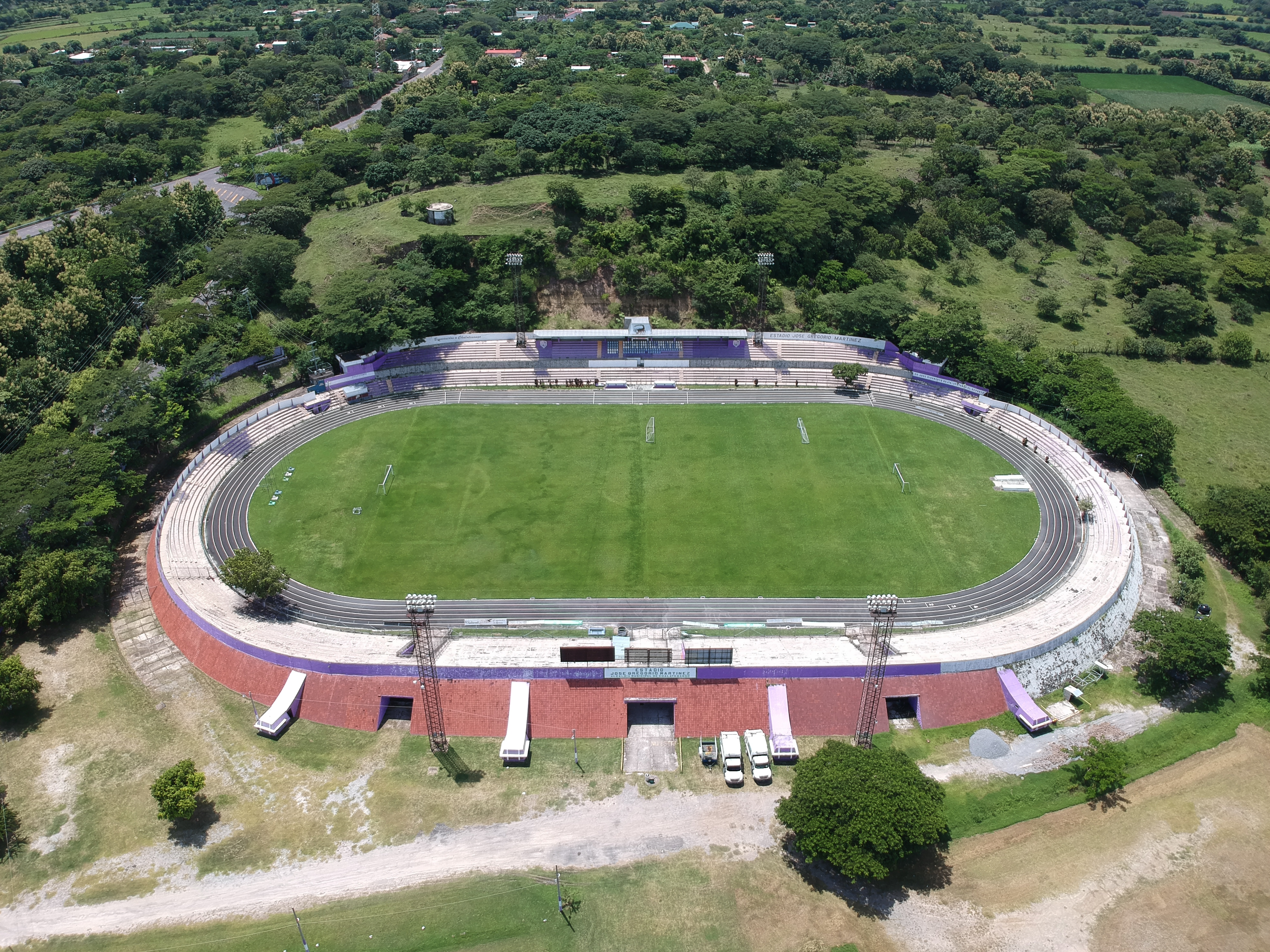
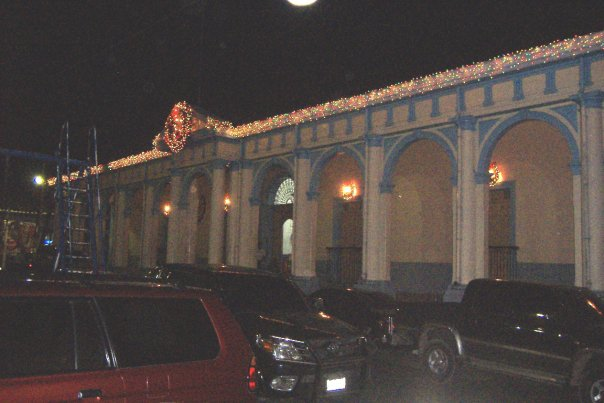
- St. John the Baptist Cathedral City center of Chalatenango José Gregorio Martínez Stadium Municipal seat

- Flag
- Nickname: Chalate
- Location within El Salvador
- Coordinates: 14°02′N 88°56′W
- Country: El Salvador
- Department: Chalatenango
- Municipality: Chalatenango Sur
- Settled: 15th century

Area
  - Land: 50.8 sq mi (131.5 km^{2})
- Elevation: 1,299 ft (396 m)

Population (2024)
  - District: 30,679
  - Rank: 48th in El Salvador
  - Density: 410/sq mi (160/km^{2})
  - Urban: 20,726
  - Rural: 9,953
- Demonym: Chalateco
- Time zone: UTC–6 (CST)
- Website: Official website

Chalatenango (Spanish pronunciation: [tʃalateˈnaŋɡo]; known as "Chalate" [tʃaˈlate] by locals) is a city and district in the Chalatenango department of El Salvador. It is the capital of the department.

== History ==
Before the Spanish conquest of El Salvador, the region near modern day Chalatenango was inhabited by the "Xaratenan" tribe. On 31 May 1522, the first of the Spanish, under the leadership of Captain Pedro de Alvarado, disembarked on the Isla Meanguera, located in the Gulf of Fonseca. In June 1524 Alvarado began a war of conquest against the indigenous people of Cuzcatlan (land of precious things). After 17 days of bloody battles many people died, but the Spanish were not defeated, so they continued their conquest.

During the following centuries the Spanish maintained their control, with European families controlling the land and the natives of the area. Towards the end of 1810 the priest José Matías Delgado, with the support of many people, began a rebellion (embajada). After years of struggle, the Central American Independence Act was signed in Guatemala, on q5 September 1821.

In 1550 Chalatenango had 600 inhabitants. The mayor of San Salvador, don Manuel de Gálvez de Corral, wrote that in 1740 San Juan Chalatenango had about 125 inhabitants and 25 heads of tributary indigenous families. He claimed that the area was “very hot and healthy.” In 1770, according to Archbishop don Pedro Cortes de Larraz, Chalatenango was the capital of the large villages of Arcatao, Concepción Quezaltepeque and Techonchogo (today San Miguel de Mercedes), plus 56 haciendas and prosperous valleys and other small villages.

On 16 February 1831, in the State of San Salvador, the title of "villa" was conferred to Chalatenango, in recognition of the important services given by this area in the process of independence and the armed struggles of 1827 and 1829 that ended in the reestablishment of constitutional order in Central America (Plan Estratégico de Desarrollo Municipal de Chalatenango).

The department of Chalatenango was heavily impacted by the civil war. Many people of Chalatenango were forced to abandon their homes because of the violence. But beginning the early 1990s, and especially after the peace accords, people have returned to repopulate the municipality.

== Politics ==
As of 2007, the municipality covers an area of 131.5 square kilometres (50.8 sq mi) and has a population of 29,271. It is divided administratively into 6 cantons and 36 caseríos.

The coat of arms is the same as the department's, as is the flag.

== Religion ==
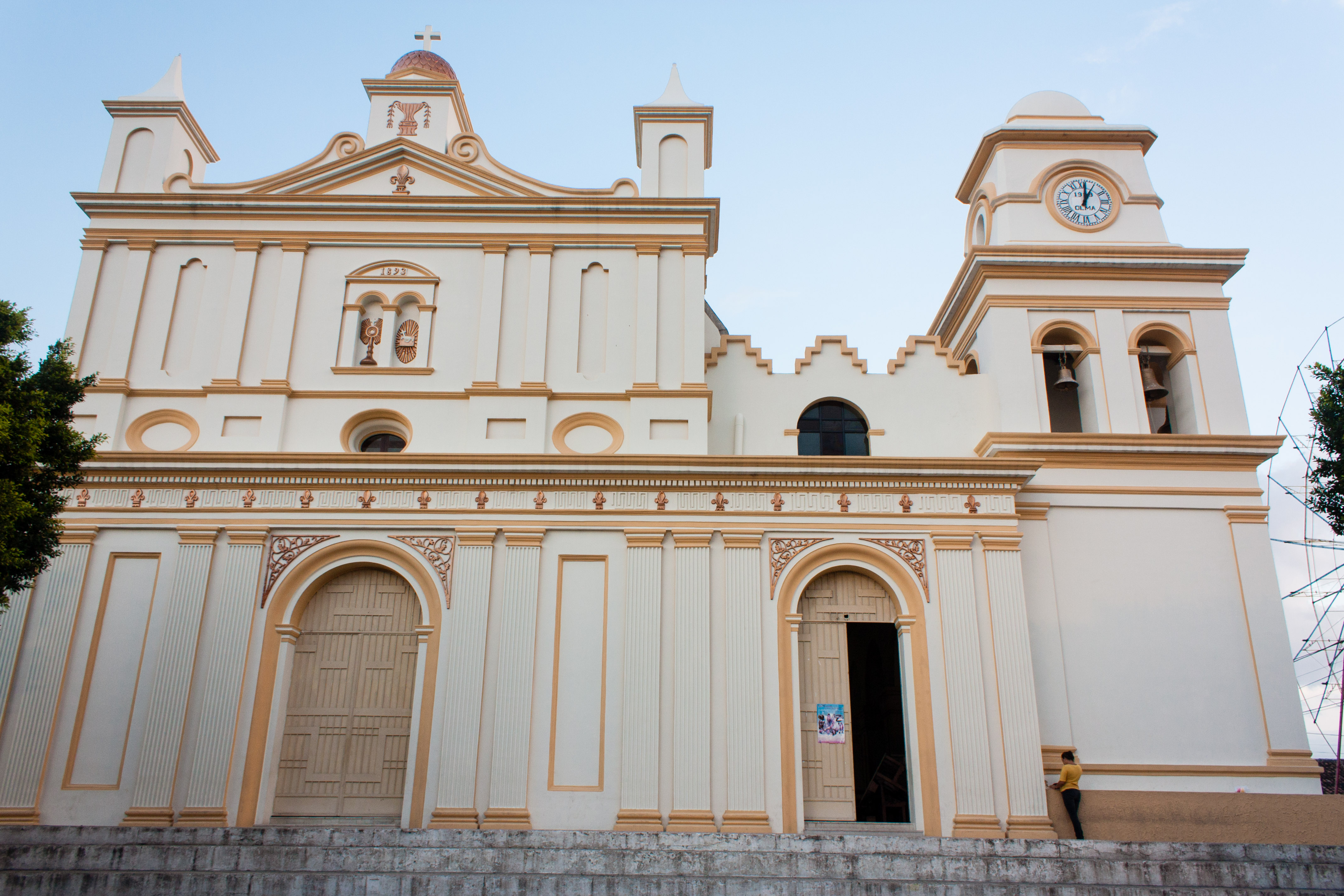
St. John the Baptist Cathedral

About 47% of the population of El Salvador identifies as Roman Catholic, and another 38% identify as Protestant. But in the last few years the population of Catholicism has been reduced (USBDHRL). There is a lot of Protestant activity in the country, and El Salvador has one of the highest rates of Protestantism in Latin America.

Religion plays an important role in the lives of many people. Patron-saint and other religious festivals are still very important and celebrated in almost all of the municipalities in the country, and almost all the cantones have their own patron-saint with their own festival.

=== Patron saint festivals ===
Urban Center: 23–24 June, in honor of St. John the Baptist
Barrio San Antonio: 16–17 January, in honor of St. Anthony of Padua
Barrio La Sierpe: 21 November, in honor of the Our Lady of Peace
Barrio El Chile: 30 December, a traditional festival
Colonia Fátima: 13 May, in honor of the Our Lady of Fátima
Colonia Veracruz: 3 May, in honor of the Holy Cross
Barrio el Calvario: last Saturday of January, in honor of the Virgin of Mercy
Upatoro: 28 February, in honor of Saint Roch
Caserío El Chuptal: 30 January, in honor of St. Charalambos
Reubicación No. 15–18 1: January, in honor of the Black Christ of Esquipulas.
Reubicación No. 2: 14–15 October, in honor of St. Teresa de Jesús
Reubicación No. 3: 7–8 December, in honor of the Immaculate Conception.
Caserío Tepeyac: 12 December, in honor of the Our Lady of Guadalupe
Guarjila: 4 October, in honor of Francis of Assisi

-15 February, a traditional festival,
-10–12 October, to celebrate the repopulation of the village after the inhabitants relocated in 1987.

Caserío de Guancora: 29 May, in honor of Our Lady of the Rosary
Cantón Las Minas: 8 December, in honor of the Immaculate Conception
Caserío El Jìcaro: 13 February, in honor of St. Anthony of Padua
Cantón San José: 19 March, in honor of Saint Joseph

== Sports ==
Chalatenango is home to the former professional football teams Alacranes del Norte and AD Chalatenango, both of which played their home games at José Gregorio Martínez Stadium.

== Notable people ==
- Manuel de Jesús Córdova (1911–?), military officer
- Miguel Díaz (born 1957), footballer
- Roberto Domínguez (born 1997), footballer
- Oswaldo Estéfano Escobar Aguilar (born 1968), bishop of the Diocese of Chalatenango since 2016
- Evelio Menjivar-Ayala (born 1970), auxiliary bishop of the Archdiocese of Washington since 2023
- Carlos Humberto Romero (1924–2017), President of El Salvador from 1977 to 1979

== See also ==
- Core Relocations

== Bibliography ==
- CIA World Factbook. November 15, 2007. “El Salvador.” [Online]. https://www.cia.gov/ library/publications/the-world-factbook/geos/es.html. Retrieved December 5, 2007.
- Embajada de El Salvador en EE. UU. (Embajada), De la Civilización a la Independencia. [Online]. https://web.archive.org/web/20080120012009/http://www.elsalvador.org/home.nsf. Retrieved December 4, 2007.
- Foley, Michael W. 2006. Laying the Groundwork: The Struggle for Civil Society in El Salvador. Journal of Interamerican Studies and World Affairs. 38 (1): 67-104.
- Martínez Alas, José Salomón, Aguilardo Pérez Yancky, Ismael Ernesto Crespín Rivera, and Deysi Ester Cierra Anaya. 2005. “Diagnostico Cultural Municipio de Chalatenango, 2005.” El Instituo para Rescate Ancestral Indígena (RAIS): El Salvador.
- Stahler-Sholk, Richard. 1994. El Salvador's Negotiated Transition: From Low-Intensity Conflict to Low-IntensityDemocracy. Journal of Interamerican Studies and World Affairs. 36 (4): 1-59.
- US Bureau of Democracy, Human Rights, and Labor (USBHRL). November 8, 2005. “International Religious Freedom Report 2005.”
- Ralph Sprenkels (2018). After Insurgency: Revolution and Electoral Politics in El Salvador. University of Notre Dame Press. ISBN 978-0268103286 – via Google Books.
