= Arcatao =

- District
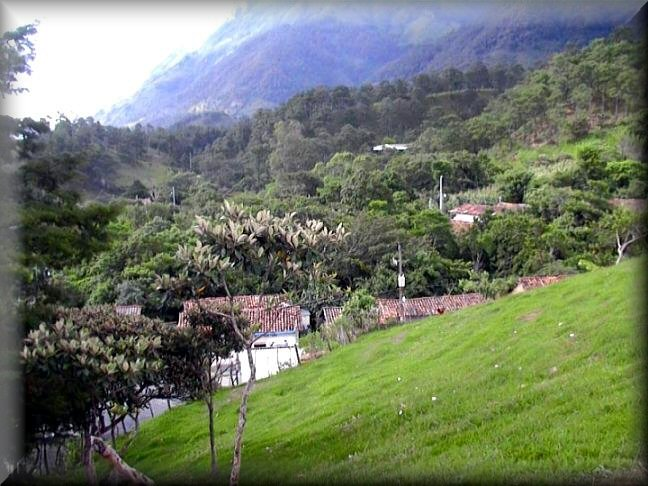

- Location in El Salvador
- Coordinates: 14°5′38″N 88°44′58″W
- Country: El Salvador
- Department: Chalatenango
- Municipality: Chalatenango Sur

Area
  - District: 25.8 sq mi (66.8 km^{2})
- Elevation: 2,126 ft (648 m)

Population (2024 census)
  - District: 2,252
  - Rank: 245th in El Salvador
  - Rural: 2,252

Arcatao is a district and small town in the Department of Chalatenango, El Salvador.

== Geography ==
Arcatao is located 32 km east from Chalatenango at the border with the Republic of Honduras in a small valley between the mountains; La Cañada and Caracol. Rivers include the Sumpul River, Lempa River, Zazalapa River and the Guayampoque River. Its little villages are: Cerro Grande, Eramon, Las Vegas, Los Sitios, Teosinte and Los Filos.

== Demography ==
Population: 800 inhabitants in 1992, 2,895 in 2004 and about 2,990 in 2007.

== Economy ==
The principal source of income comes from the agricultural sector. With its temperate climate most of the year and the heavy rainfall during the winter season, the soil is rich in nutrients allowing the growth of many crops like; white corn, a variety of colored beans, rice, sugar cane, tomatoes, watermelons, squash, chayotes, cucumbers. Fruits include mangoes, cashews, jocotes, bananas, coconuts and paternas. Other industries are the manufacturing of iron implements, like; knives, machetes, shovels, etc., and manual artistic souvenirs. Also monetary aid received from relatives working outside of El Salvador.

== Roads ==
One of the roads is semi-paved and goes north-west bound, linking with other villages like Nueva Trinidad, San Jose Las Flores and Los Ranchos. This road in the near future will be part of the Route (CA-3) which will benefit many other cities along the border with Honduras. This project will start in Metapan ending in La Union. The other road goes south-east, connecting with the City of Nombre de Jesus (The Name of Jesus). There is another road linking with Guarita in Honduras and another goes east, which connects to La Virtud in Honduras as well. Autobuses travel to Chalatenango and San Salvador daily.

== Education ==
There is a kindergarten and public School from 1st to 12th grade. Computer training and a public library is available.

== Places of interest ==
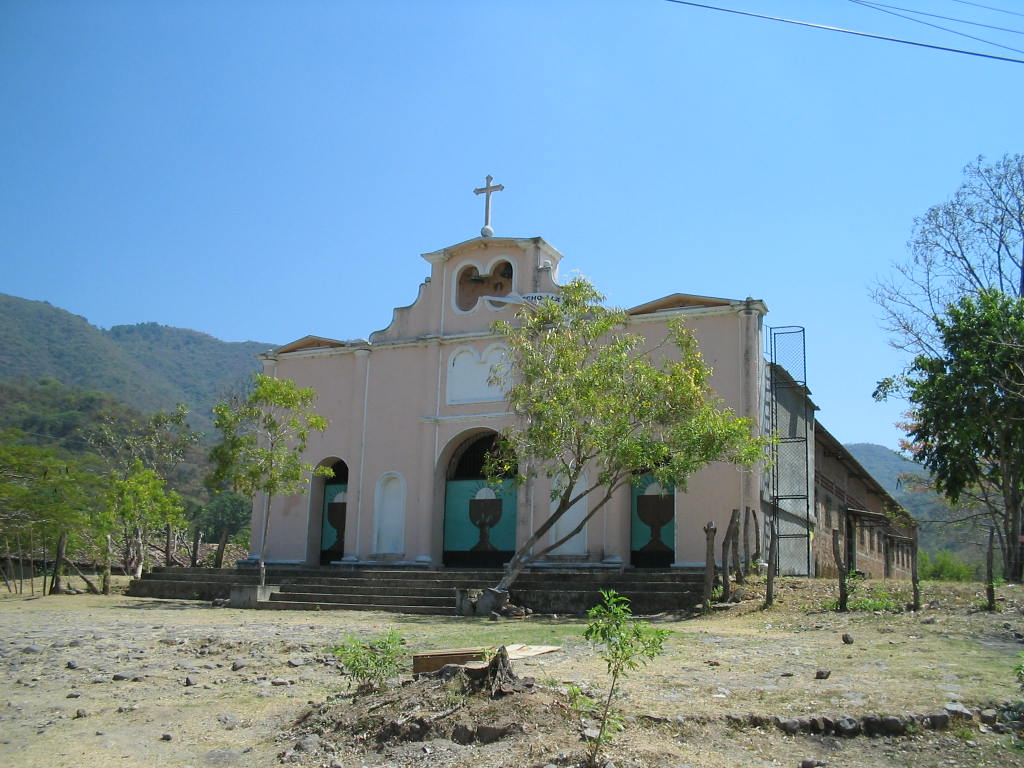
The church

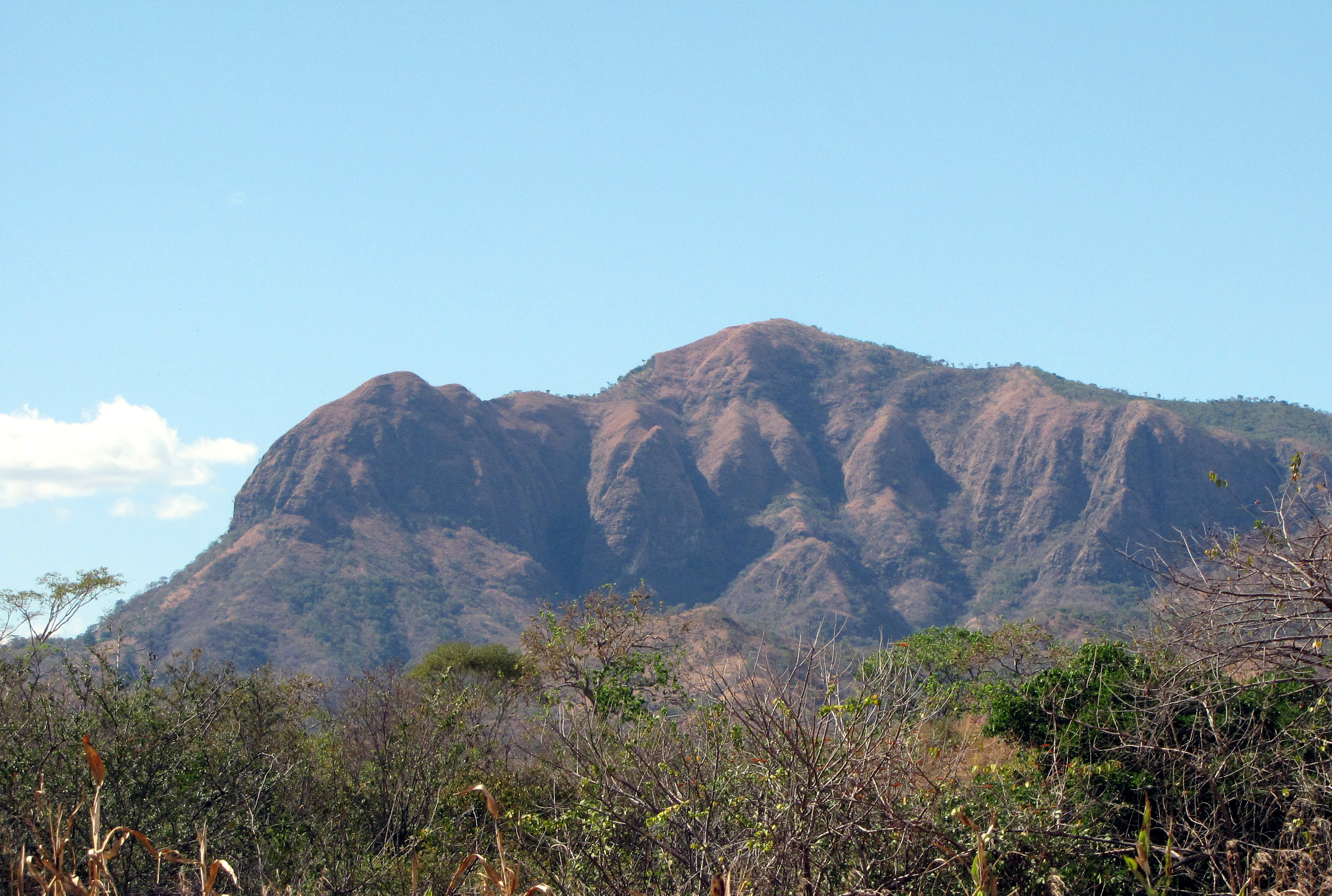
Cerro Eramon

- Gualsinga River, should be called "the crystal river" due to this being one of the last crystalline waters in the country.
- Eramon mount Located at 3,000 feet above the sea level. The place where Arcatao was settled about 300 years ago.
- Las Ventanas mount (The windows).

== Holy days ==
There are two Patronal festivities: the first is on February 2. "Dia de la Candelaria" and August 24 "Dia de San Bartolome Apostol". During these two holy days, for about three or four days prior to the holy day, the community meets and celebrates with different activities, like El Correo, with people wearing costumes, and the exploding sparks everywhere. Tianguis or swap-meets are taking place at the central plaza where typical food is served in every corner.

== Safety ==
Arcatao, specifically is quiet. There is no violence nor gangs interrupting the peace of the people. The PNC or Civil Nacional Police is 24 hours on watch, to protect and serve.

== Health ==
One Medical Center is available however is operating at 80% of its potential. At the present, this Center is in need of outsiders' support due to its facility being too small for the number of patients in need of medical services. Also it does not have sufficient Medical Assistants to reach 100% of desired performance.

== Sister cities ==
- Madison, United States
