= Luis Morao Andreazza =

Italian-born Salvadoran Roman Catholic bishop (born 1939)

Most Reverend Luis Morao Andreazza OFM
- Bishop Emeritus of Chalatenango
- Church: Catholic Church
- Diocese: Chalatenango
- Installed: 21 April 2007
- Term ended: 14 July 2016
- Predecessor: Eduardo Alas Alfaro
- Successor: Oswaldo Estéfano Escobar Aguilar
- Other posts: Auxiliary Bishop of Santa Ana and Titular Bishop of Tullia (2003–2007); Apostolic Administrator of the Military Ordinariate of El Salvador (1997–2003)

Orders
- Ordination: 29 June 1966
- Consecration: 17 January 2004 by Romeo Tovar Astorga

Personal details
- Born: Luigi Morao; 26 June 1939 (age 87) Vedelago, Kingdom of Italy

Luis Morao Andreazza OFM (born 26 June 1939) is an Italian-born Salvadoran Roman Catholic prelate, who served as the Bishop of the Diocese of Chalatenango in El Salvador from 2007 to 2016. Previously he served as an Auxiliary Bishop of the Diocese of Santa Ana and Titular Bishop of Tullia from 2003 to 2007 and an Apostolic Administrator of the Military Ordinariate of El Salvador from 1997 to 2003.

== Biography ==
=== Early life and formation ===
Luis Morao was born in Vedelago, in the Province of Treviso, Italy. He entered the Order of Friars Minor (Franciscans) and made his solemn profession of vows on 17 September 1964 and was ordained to the priesthood on 29 June 1966.

=== Missionary work ===
Shortly after his ordination, Morao from 1967 to 1984 served as a missionary in the Philippines and, for a time, provincial secretary of the Franciscan missions in Venice. From 1985 to 1988 he was a missionary in Guatemala. Since 1988 he has served in El Salvador. Specifically, from 1988 to 1997 he worked in the Diocese of San Miguel, and from 19 June 1997 until 12 November 2003 he was Apostolic Administrator "sede vacante et ad nutum Sanctae Sedis" of the Military Ordinariate for El Salvador.

=== Episcopal ministry ===
On 12 November 2003, Pope John Paul II appointed him as the Auxiliary Bishop of the Diocese of Santa Ana and Titular Bishop of Tullia. He was consecrated on 17 January 2004 by Bishop Romeo Tovar Astorga.

On 21 April 2007, Pope Benedict XVI named him the second Bishop of the Diocese of Chalatenango. He served the diocese for nine years until Pope Francis accepted his resignation on 14 July 2016, following his reaching the age limit of 75 as prescribed by canon law.
