= St. John the Baptist Cathedral (El Salvador) =

Roman Catholic cathedral in El Salvador

- Catedral San Juan Bautista
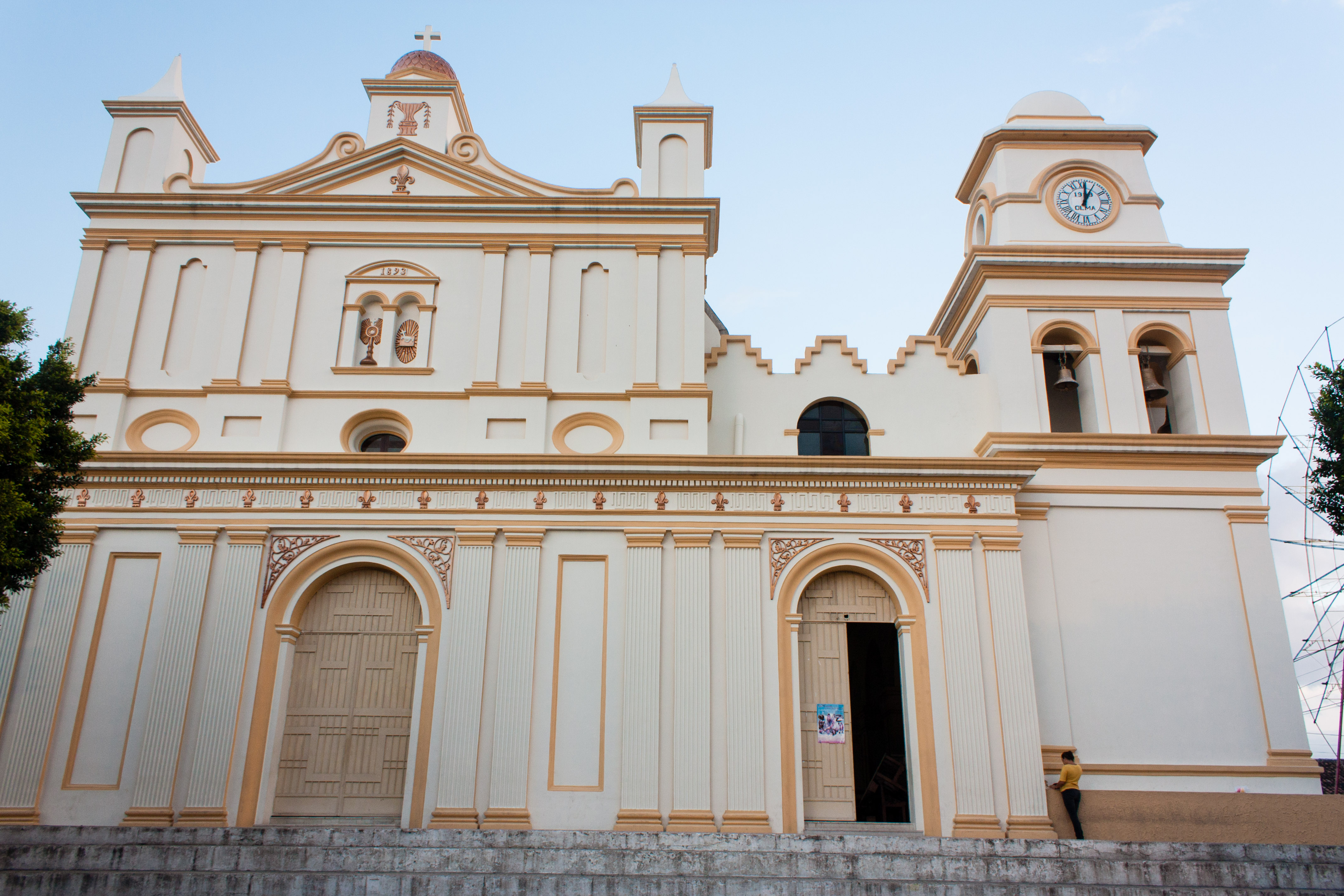
- St. John the Baptist Cathedral
- 14°02′29″N 88°56′21″W
- Language: Spanish
- Denomination: Catholic

Architecture
- Groundbreaking: 1848
- Completed: 1893

Administration
- Diocese: Chalatenango

Clergy
- Bishop(s): Oswaldo Estéfano Escobar Aguilar, O.C.D.

St. John the Baptist Cathedral (Spanish: Catedral San Juan Bautista), also known as the Chalatenango Cathedral (Catedral de Chalatenango), is a Catholic cathedral located in Chalatenango, El Salvador.

== History ==
The cathedral was preceded by a small temple, built in 1713, located on the same site as the present cathedral. Construction of the current cathedral began in 1848 and it was completed in 1893.

== Church service schedule ==
The following is the schedule of services held at the cathedral:

- Monday: 7:00 a.m., 5:30 p.m.
- Tuesday: 7:00 a.m., 5:30 p.m.
- Wednesday: 7:00 a.m., 5:30 p.m.
- Thursday: 7:00 a.m., 9:00 a.m., 7:00 p.m.
- Friday: 7:00 a.m., 6:00 p.m.
- Saturday: 7:00 a.m., 5:30 p.m.
- Sunday: 8:00 a.m., 10:00 a.m., 5:00 p.m.
