= Chalatenango =

Chalatenango can refer to:

- Chalatenango Department in El Salvador
- Chalatenango, a city in El Salvador
  - A.D. Chalatenango, a Salvadoran professional association football club based in the city
