= Tullia =

Tullia is a Roman feminine name, originally the feminine form of the patrician gentile name Tullius, as in :

- Tullia Minor, the last queen of pre-Republican Rome
- Tullia (daughter of Cicero) (79–45 BC), the daughter of the Roman orator and republican politician Cicero

It may also refer to :

Places and jurisdictions

- Tullia, Numidia, formerly an Ancient Roman town and diocese in Numidia, presently in Algeria and a Latin Catholic titular see

Female given name

- Tullia d'Aragona (c.1510–1556), Italian courtesan and poet
- Tullia Magrini (1950–2005), Italian anthropologist
- Tullia Zevi, (1919–2011) a 20th-century journalist

Biology

- synonym of the mint genus Pycnanthemum
