= John Nhan Tran =

Vietnamese American Catholic prelate (born 1966)

His Excellency, The Most Reverend John Nhan Tran
- Auxiliary Bishop of Atlanta
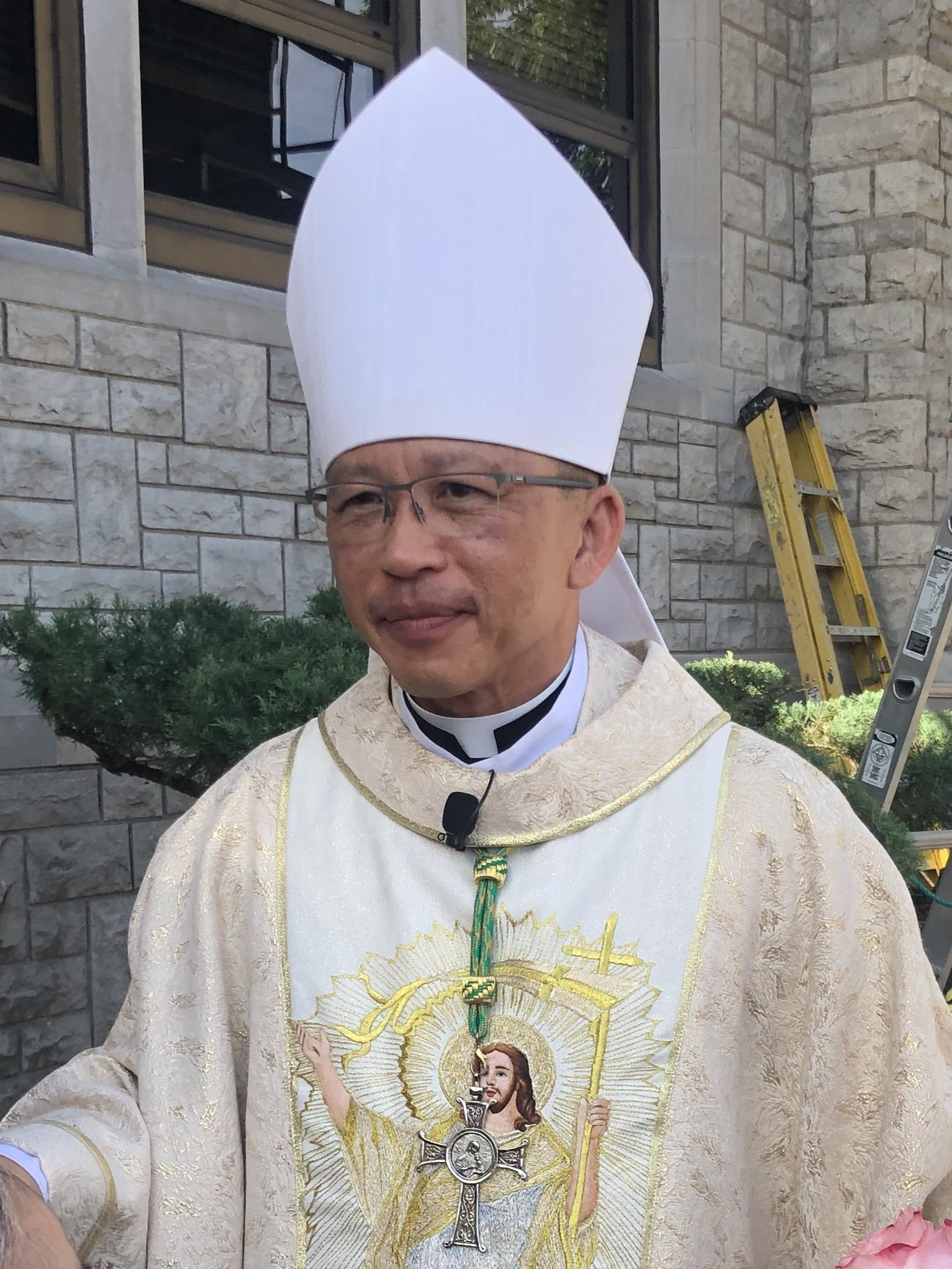
- Tran in 2023 at the Marian Days pilgrimage in Carthage, Missouri.
- Native name: Gioan Trần Văn Nhàn
- Church: Catholic
- Archdiocese: Atlanta
- Province: Atlanta
- Appointed: October 25, 2022
- Installed: January 23, 2023
- Other post: Titular Bishop of Tullia

Orders
- Ordination: May 30, 1992 by Francis B. Schulte
- Consecration: January 23, 2023 by Gregory John Hartmayer, Gregory Michael Aymond, and Alfred Clifton Hughes

Personal details
- Born: Trần Văn Nhàn; February 6, 1966 (age 60) Bình Giã, Vũng Tàu, South Vietnam
- Education: Saint Joseph Seminary College; Don Bosco College; Notre Dame Seminary
- Motto: God will provide; (Chúa quan phòng)
- Styles
- Reference style: His Excellency; The Most Reverend
- Spoken style: Your Excellency
- Religious style: Bishop

John Nhan Van Tran (born February 6, 1966) is a Vietnamese American Catholic prelate serving as an auxiliary bishop of the Archdiocese of Atlanta in Georgia since 2023.

== Biography ==
=== Early life ===
Trần Văn Nhàn was born in the Bình Giã district of South Vietnam on February 6, 1966, to John Trần Văn Dũng and Anna Nguyễn Thị Lài. As a young man, Tran's father was sentenced to 18 years in a Communist concentration camp because he was a member of a Catholic youth group. He eventually escaped after three years, and restarted his life from there after fleeing to South Vietnam. When Tran was two years old, his mother was shot and killed during the Vietnam War due to "friendly fire". Tran's older brother was also killed by a land mine.

=== Emigration and education ===
At the age of nine, Tran and his family fled from Bạch Đằng Quay in Saigon on a small boat. They were warned by his uncle, who had left the seminary and joined the military, that South Vietnam would fall soon. Tran later said, "I truly believe, if my uncle hadn't been a military officer, we wouldn't have made it out." Running out of water, they were rescued from the South China Sea by an American ship and arrived in the Philippines, and then eventually brought to Fort Chaffee, Arkansas from Guam. The family was later resettled in New Orleans, Louisiana, after being sponsored by a family in Algiers.

After primary school, Tran first attended Edna Karr Junior High School in Algiers. Deciding that he wanted to become a priest, he was accepted into the high school program of the Congregation of the Mother of the Redeemer (then called the Congregation of the Mother Co-Redemptrix) in Carthage, Missouri, for the 8th grade in the school year of 1979–1980. He ended up only staying for three days before family circumstances caused him to drop out.

Tran then transferred to a boarding high school in Goshen, New York, operated by the Salesians of Don Bosco. The Salesians then sent him to Don Bosco College, their seminary in Newton, New Jersey. Tran then returned to Louisiana to complete his studies at Saint Joseph Seminary College in Saint Benedict. After graduating, he attended Notre Dame Seminary in New Orleans and graduated there in 1992.

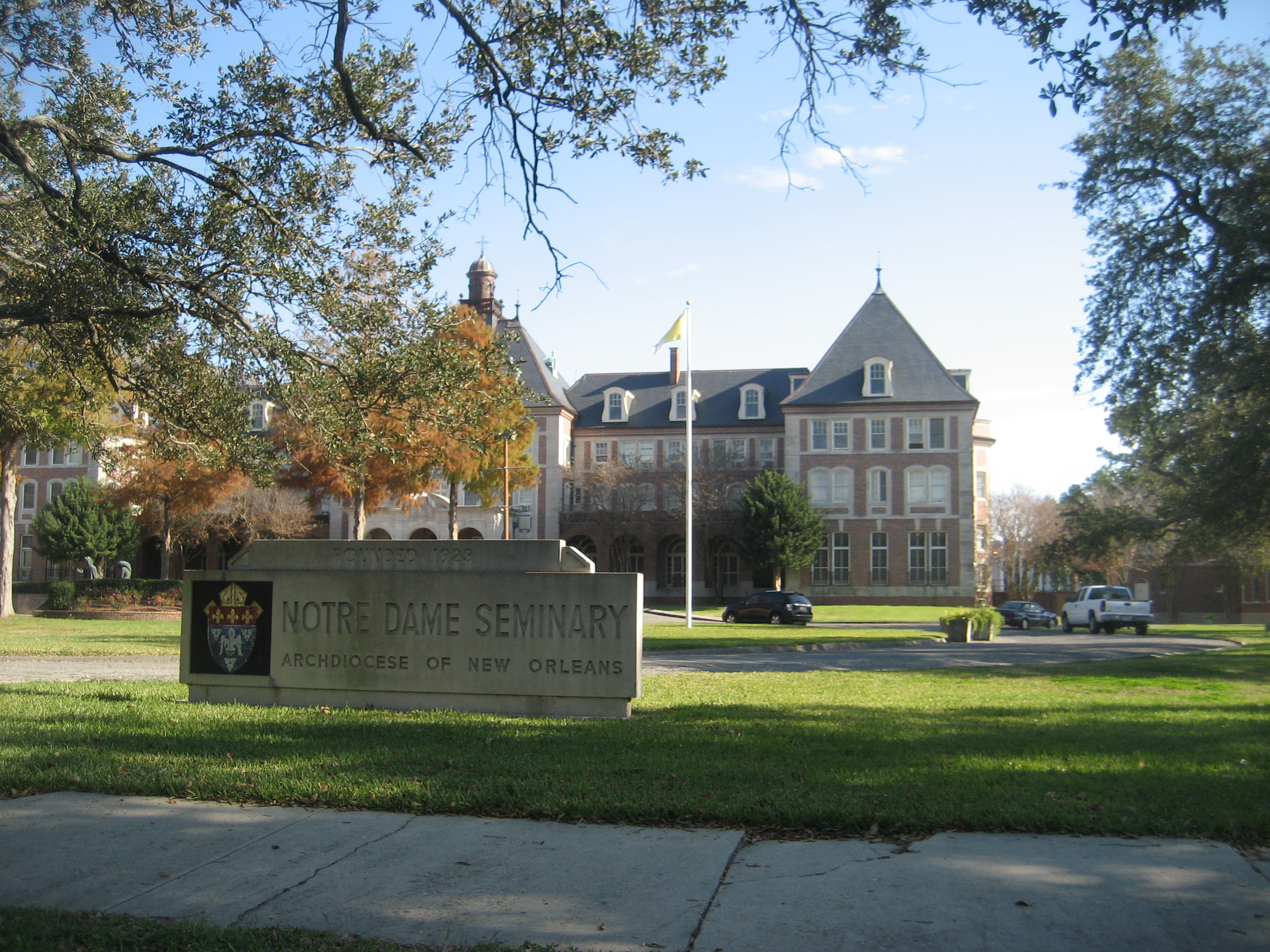
Tran attended Notre Dame Seminary in New Orleans until he graduated with a Master of Divinity in 1992.

=== Priesthood ===
Tran was ordained to the priesthood on May 30, 1992, for the Archdiocese of New Orleans by Archbishop Francis B. Schulte. After his ordination, the archdiocese assigned Tran as parochial vicar at the following Louisiana parishes:

- Our Lady of Lourdes in Violet (1992 to 1995)
- Visitation of Our Lady in Marrero (1992 to 1997)
- St. Angela Merici in Metairie (1992 to 1998)
- Our Lady of Divine Providence in Metairie (1998 to 2001)

In 2001, the archdiocese appointed Tran as pastor of St. Louise de Marillac Parish in Arabi. The archdiocese then transferred him to St. Bonaventure Parish in Avondale (2003 to 2007). During this period, Tran also served as chaplain for the St. Bernard's Sheriff's Office in the civil parish of Saint Bernard. (Note: Here, the term "parish" refers to the governmental subdivision called a county in the majority of the United States, and not to a church community or "Portion of People of God" in the conventional Catholic sense.) After Hurricane Katrina in 2005, he celebrated mass for first responders and other personnel in parking lots and nursing homes.

Tran became pastor of St. Joan of Arc Parish in LaPlace from 2007 to 2014. In 2014, the archdiocese selected him as pastor of Mary, Queen of Peace Parish in Mandeville, his last pastoral assignment before becoming bishop. Additionally, Tran served on the priest personnel board and as chair of the archdiocesan presbyteral council. He was also dean of the St. John-St. Charles Deanery.

=== Episcopacy ===
Tran was appointed an auxiliary bishop of Atlanta and titular bishop of Tullia by Pope Francis on October 25, 2022. He was consecrated by Archbishop Gregory Hartmayer on January 23, 2023, at St. Peter Chanel Church in Roswell, Georgia, with Archbishops Gregory Aymond and Alfred Hughes serving as co-consecrators. He subsequently became the third Vietnamese American bishop.

His episcopal motto comes from his time at Notre Dame Seminary, where the inscription Deus providebit (Latin for 'God will provide') appears above the entrance to the seminary. The main color scheme of red and yellow on his personal coat of arms is derived from the Flag of South Vietnam.

=== Personal life ===
Tran is fluent in Vietnamese and English. In 2015, Tran donated a kidney to Thanh Nguyen, an Archdiocese of Oklahoma City priest and friend from Saint Joseph Seminary who was suffering kidney failure.

== See also ==
- Catholic Church hierarchy
- Catholic Church in the United States
- Historical list of the Catholic bishops of the United States
- List of Catholic bishops of the United States
- Lists of patriarchs, archbishops, and bishops
