= San Francisco Lempa =

- District

- Location in El Salvador
- Coordinates: 13°58′N 89°1′W
- Country: El Salvador
- Department: Chalatenango
- Municipality: Chalatenango Sur
- Elevation: 669 ft (204 m)

Population (2024)
  - District: 774
  - Rank: 260th in El Salvador
  - Rural: 774

San Francisco Lempa is a district in the Chalatenango Department of El Salvador.
