= Southern Chalatenango =

Coordinates: 14.041°N 88.940°W

Southern Chalatenango Chalatenango Sur (Spanish)
- Municipality
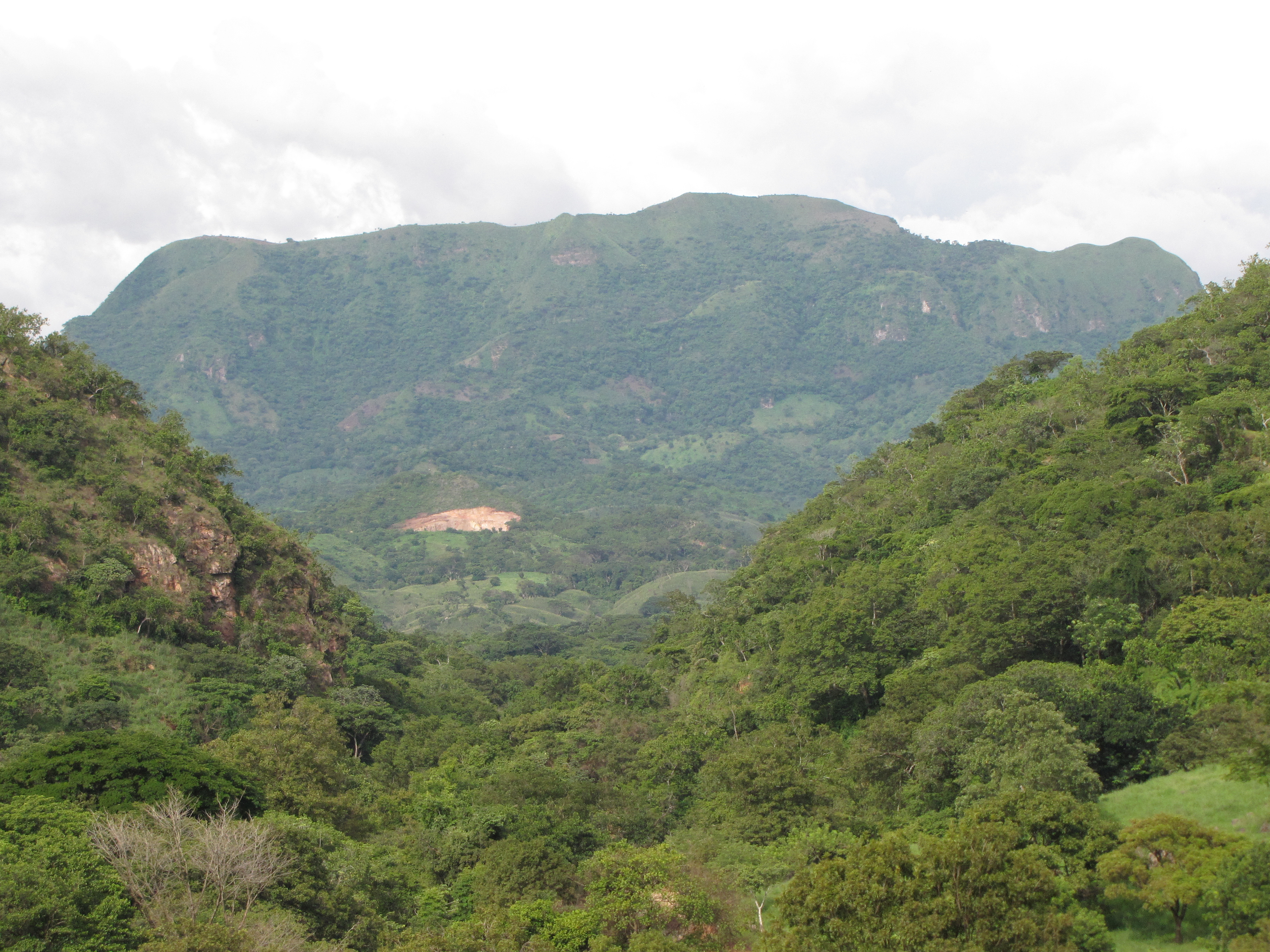
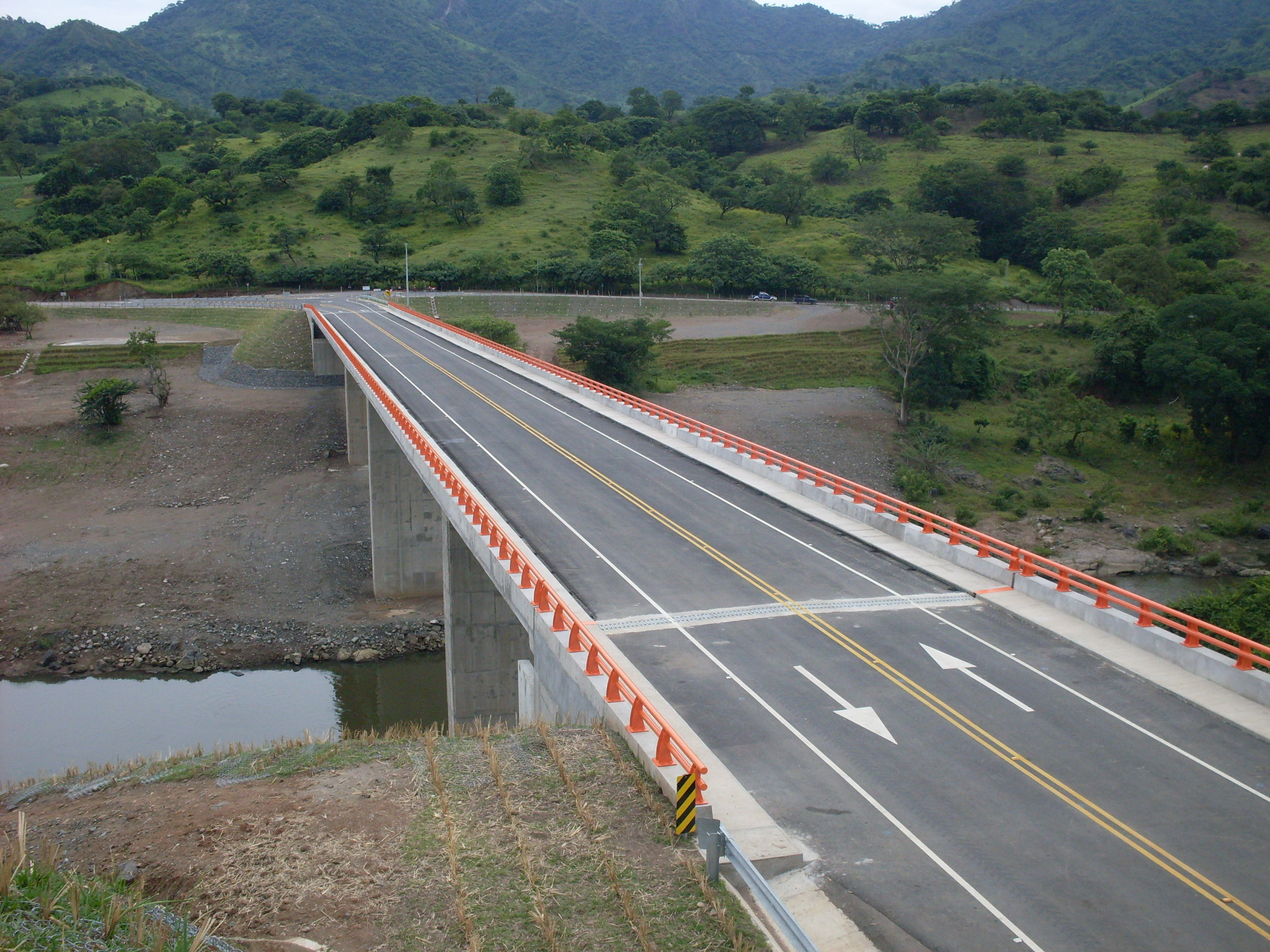
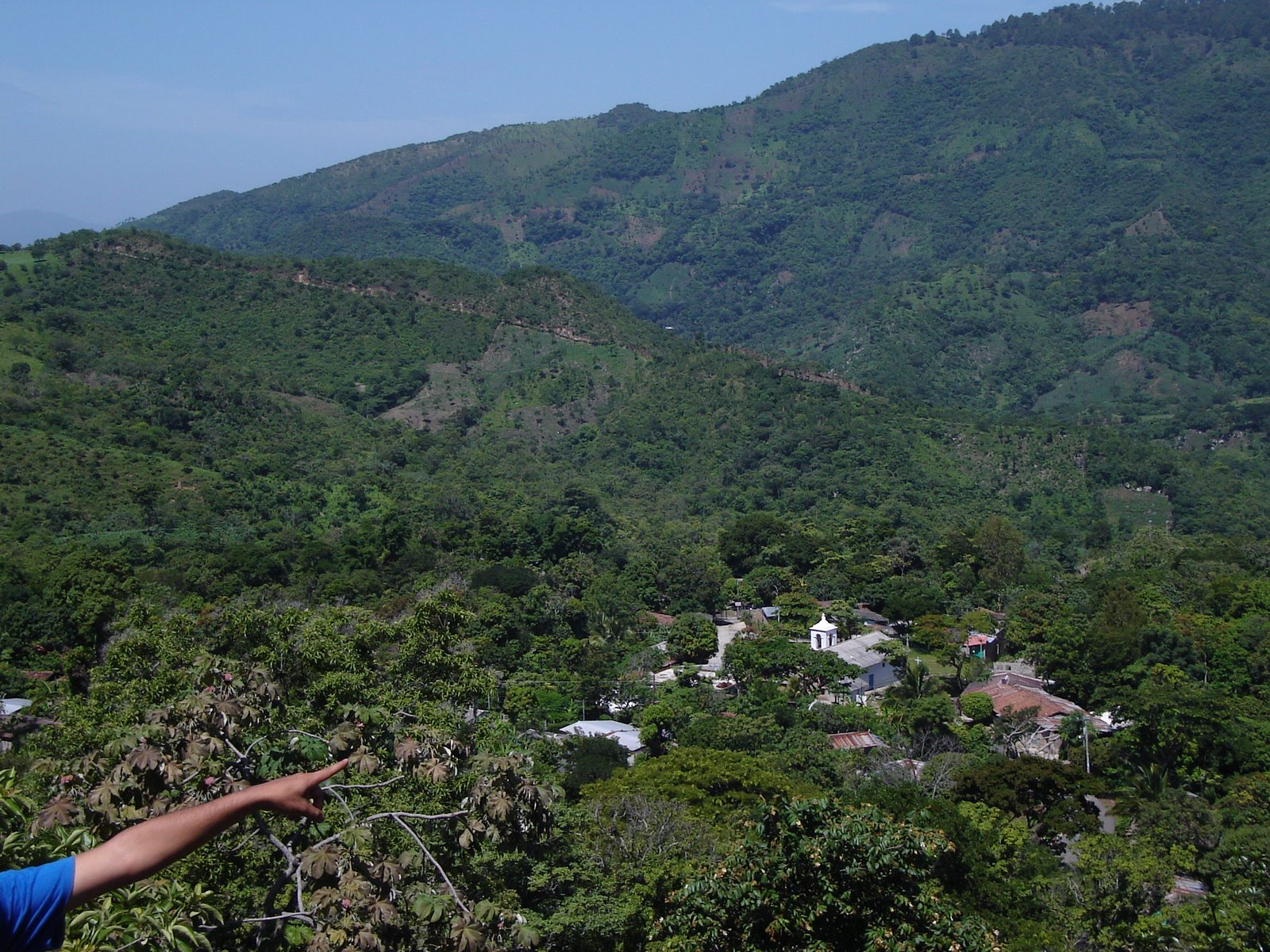
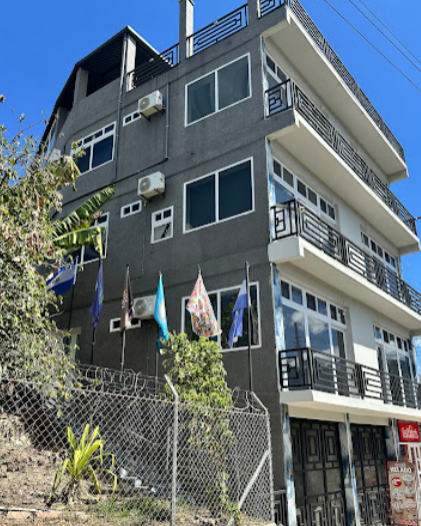
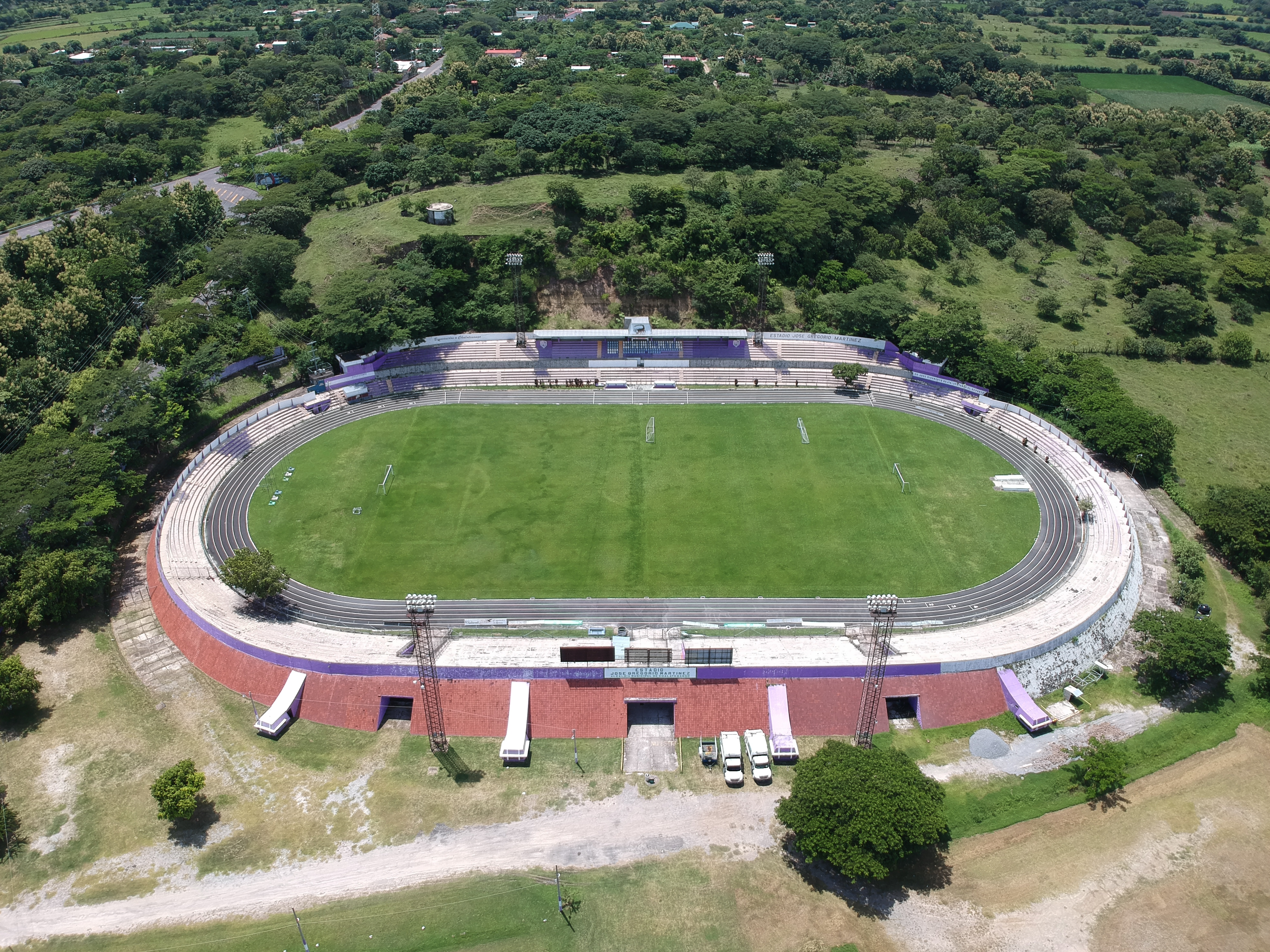
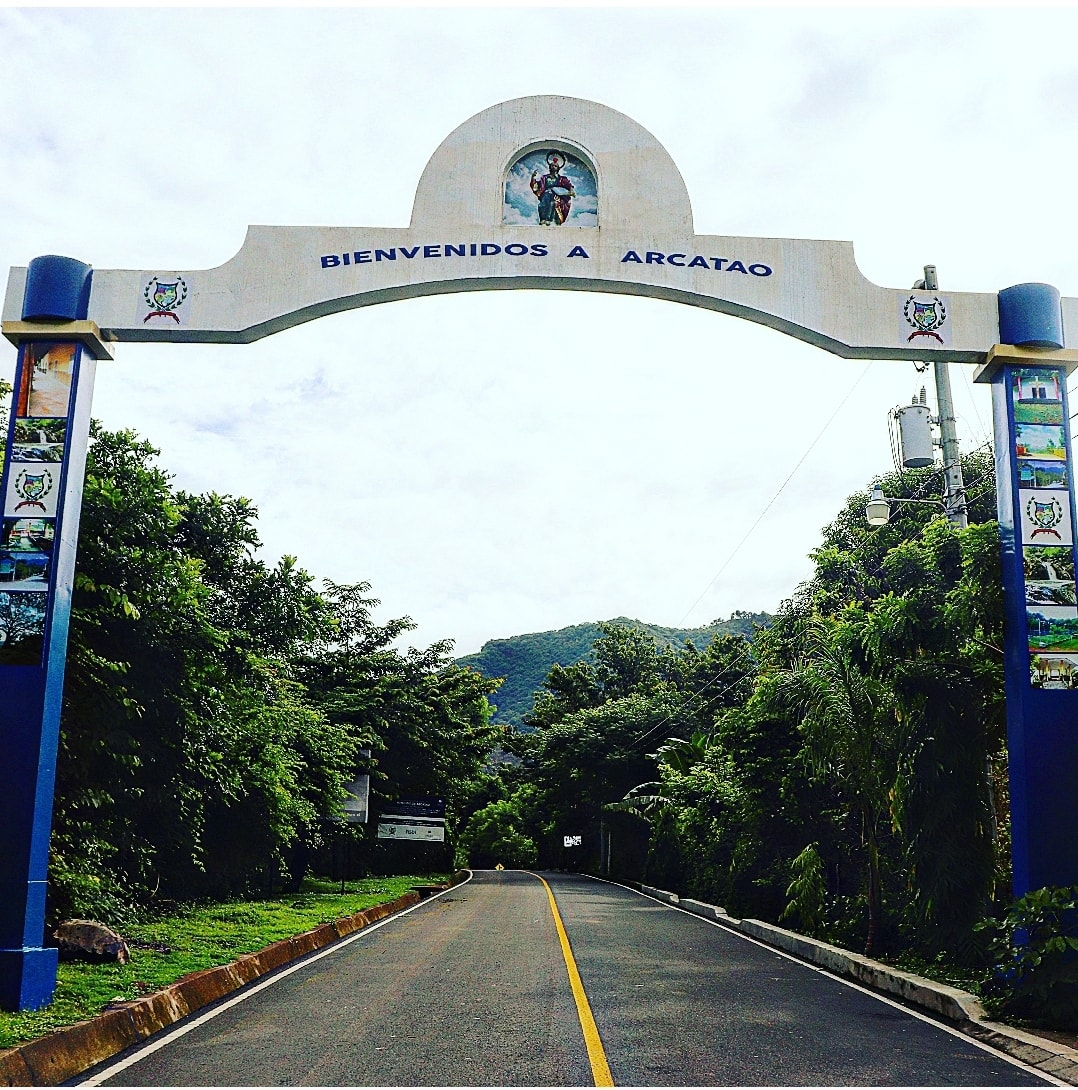
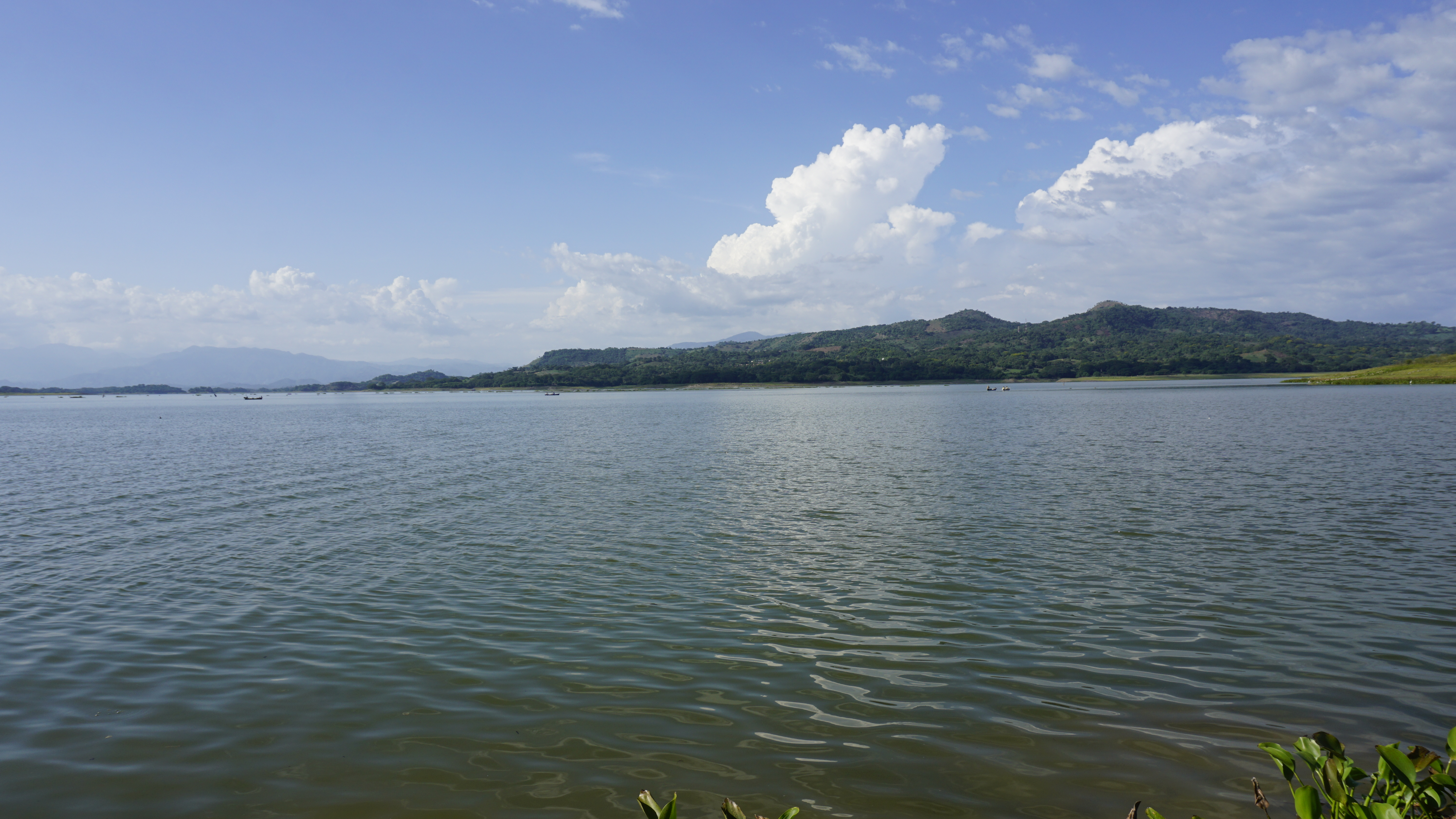
- Eramón Hill, Chalatenango Sur Nombre de Jesús bridge Las Vueltas district panoramic view Potonico accommodations centre José Gregorio Martínez Stadium, Chalatenango Arcatao welcoming arch View to San Francisco Lempa district

- Country: El Salvador
- Department: Chalatenango

Government
  - Mayor: Víctor Hernández (disputed) (Note: On 13 April 2026, the municipal council of Chalatenango Sur voted to remove Mayor Milton Serrano for "very grave administrative faults" and appointed council member Víctor Hernández to replace him, but Serrano asserts that the vote was illegal and that he is still mayor. On 8 June, the Supreme Electoral Court recognized Serrano's removal and Hernández's appointment, but Serrano continues to assert that his removal was illegal.)

Area
  - Total: 713.99 km^{2} (275.67 sq mi)

Population (2024)
  - Total: 73,295

Southern Chalatenango (Spanish: Chalatenango Sur) is one of the 44 municipalities of El Salvador. This municipality is made up of 20 districts Arcatao, Azacualpa, San José Cancasque, Chalatenango, Comalapa, Concepción Quezaltepeque, El Carrizal, La Laguna, Las Vueltas, Las Flores, Nombre de Jesús, Nueva Trinidad, Ojos de Agua, Potonico, San Antonio de la Cruz, San Antonio Los Ranchos, San Francisco Lempa, San Isidro Labrador, San Luis del Carmen and San Miguel de Mercedes. The municipality comprises the largest amount of districts within the entire country. The municipality arise as part of reducing the amount of municipalities in El Salvador. Its mayor has been disputed since 13 April 2026 between Milton Serrano and Víctor Hernández.

== Mayor ==
Mayor	Elected	Term of office			Political party	Ref.
Mayor	Elected	Assumed office	Left office	Duration	Political party	Ref.
Milton Serrano	2024	1 May 2024	13 April 2026 (disputed)	1 year and 347 days	National Coalition Party	
Víctor Hernández	–	13 April 2026	Incumbent (disputed)	218 days	National Coalition Party	
