= Nombre de Jesús =

- District
- Location in El Salvador
- Coordinates: 14°0′N 88°44′W
- Country: El Salvador
- Department: Chalatenango
- Municipality: Chalatenango Sur
- Elevation: 456 ft (139 m)

Population (2024)
  - District: 4,017
  - Rank: 211th in El Salvador
  - Rural: 4,017

Nombre de Jesús is a district in the Chalatenango Department of El Salvador.
