= San Luis del Carmen =

- District
- Location in El Salvador
- Coordinates: 13°58′N 88°58′W
- Country: El Salvador
- Department: Chalatenango
- Municipality: Chalatenango Sur
- Elevation: 1,184 ft (361 m)

Population (2024)
  - District: 1,038
  - Rank: 258th in El Salvador
  - Rural: 1,038

San Luis del Carmen is a district in the Chalatenango Department of El Salvador.
