= Tullia, Numidia =

Tullia is an Ancient city and former bishopric in Numidia and present Latin Catholic titular see.

== History ==
The city, near modern Annaba (Algeria) was important enough in the Roman province of Numidia to become a suffragan bishopric.

== Titular see ==
The diocese was nominally restored in 1933 and has had the following incumbents, both of the lowest (episcopal) and intermediary (archiepiscopal) ranks:

- Titular Bishop Joost van den Biesen, White Fathers (M. Afr.) (later Mr.) (1948.02.12 – 1958.01.24)
- Titular Bishop Roman Andrzejewski (1981.11.12 – 2003.07.07)
- Titular Archbishop Georges Cottier, Dominican Order O.P. (2003.10.07 – 2003.10.21), later Cardinal)
- Titular Bishop Luis Morao Andreazza, Friars Minor (O.F.M.) (2003.11.12 – 2007.04.21)
- Titular Bishop Franco Giulio Brambilla (2007.07.13 – 2011.11.24)
- Titular Bishop João Justino de Medeiros Silva (2011.12.21 – 2017.02.22), Auxiliary Bishop of Belo Horizonte.
- Titular Bishop John-Nhan Tran (2023.1.23 – present), Auxiliary Bishop of Atlanta
