= San José Las Flores, El Salvador =

Human settlement in El Salvador

Coordinates: 13°52′07″N 89°29′55″W

San José Las Flores is a settlement in Santa Ana Department, El Salvador.
