= San Antonio Los Ranchos =

San Antonio Los Ranchos Los Ranchos
- District
- Location in El Salvador
- Coordinates: 14°0′N 88°54′W
- Country: El Salvador
- Department: Chalatenango
- Municipality: Chalatenango Sur

Government
  - Type: Republic
- Elevation: 2,018 ft (615 m)

Population (2024)
  - District: 1,009
  - Rank: 259th in El Salvador
  - Rural: 1,009

San Antonio Los Ranchos is a district in the Chalatenango Department of El Salvador.
