= Las Flores, El Salvador =

Las Flores
- District
- Location in El Salvador
- Coordinates: 14°03′N 88°50′W
- Country: El Salvador
- Department: Chalatenango
- Municipality: Chalatenango Sur

Population (2024)
  - District: 1,301
  - Rank: 256th in El Salvador
  - Rural: 1,301

San José Las Flores (or Las Flores) is a district and city in Chalatenango Department, El Salvador. It played an important and strategic role during the Salvadoran Civil War. The town was one of the first settlements to be repopulated by refugees who had been driven away by government bombing during the early 1980s. In 1986, in defiance of the military, the civilian population returned to reconstruct the village. This was part of a campaign of a number of towns throughout northern El Salvador, with the assistance of humanitarian groups in North America and Europe, to resist the militarization of the area and prevent continued bombing during the war. For this reason, a number of U.S. cities became sister cities with Salvadoran towns to demonstrate support for the civilians during the war. Nearby towns that were also in this movement include Arcatao and Guarjila, which were repopulated in 1987.

== Geography ==
The community of San Jose Las Flores is situated to the east of the city of Chalatenango on the road towards Nueva Trinidad and Arcatao.

== Patronal Festivals ==
People in San Jose Las Flores celebrate the day of the village's patron saint in March. Local people celebrate over the course of a week with street processions, live music shows and ranching displays (known locally as Jaripeo)

== Tourism ==
Most tourists visit San Jose Las Flores when coming to the nearby River Sumpul complex. Two miles beyond Las Flores is a tourist complex with cabins, a small restaurant and a swimming area complete with two large waterslides, which are very popular with local people and visitors from further afield.

== Sister cities ==
The elementary school Escuela San Jose Las Flores has two sister schools, Holy Trinity High School, in Kanata and St. Gregory Catholic School in Ottawa. Both schools are in Ontario, Canada. It is a sister city of Cambridge, MA, United States since 1986, ratified by the Cambridge government in 1987.
