= Eduardo Alas Alfaro =

Salvadoran catholic priest (1930–2020)

- Bishop of Chalatenango
- Church: Roman Catholic
- Diocese: Chalatenango
- See: Chalatenango
- Elected: 1987
- In office: 1987–2007
- Quashed: retired

Orders
- Ordination: 1960

Personal details
- Born: Eduardo Alas Alfaro; 2 July 1930 El Salvador
- Died: 27 February 2020 (aged 89)
- Denomination: Catholic

Eduardo Alas Alfaro (2 July 1930 – 27 February 2020) was a Salvadoran Roman Catholic bishop. Alas Alfaro was born in El Salvador and was ordained to the priesthood in 1960. He served as bishop of the Roman Catholic Diocese of Chalatenango, El Salvador, from 1987 to 2007. He died on 27 February 2020.
