= Nueva Trinidad =

- District
- Location in El Salvador
- Coordinates: 14°04′N 88°48′W
- Country: El Salvador
- Department: Chalatenango
- Municipality: Chalatenango Sur
- Elevation: 1,263 ft (385 m)

Population (2024)
  - District: 1,672
  - Rank: 253rd in El Salvador
  - Rural: 1,672

Nueva Trinidad is a district in the Chalatenango Department of El Salvador.
