= Diocese of Chalatenango =

Roman Catholic diocese in El Salvador

Coordinates: 14.0415°N 88.9391°W

Diocese of Chalatenango Dioecesis Chalatenangensis
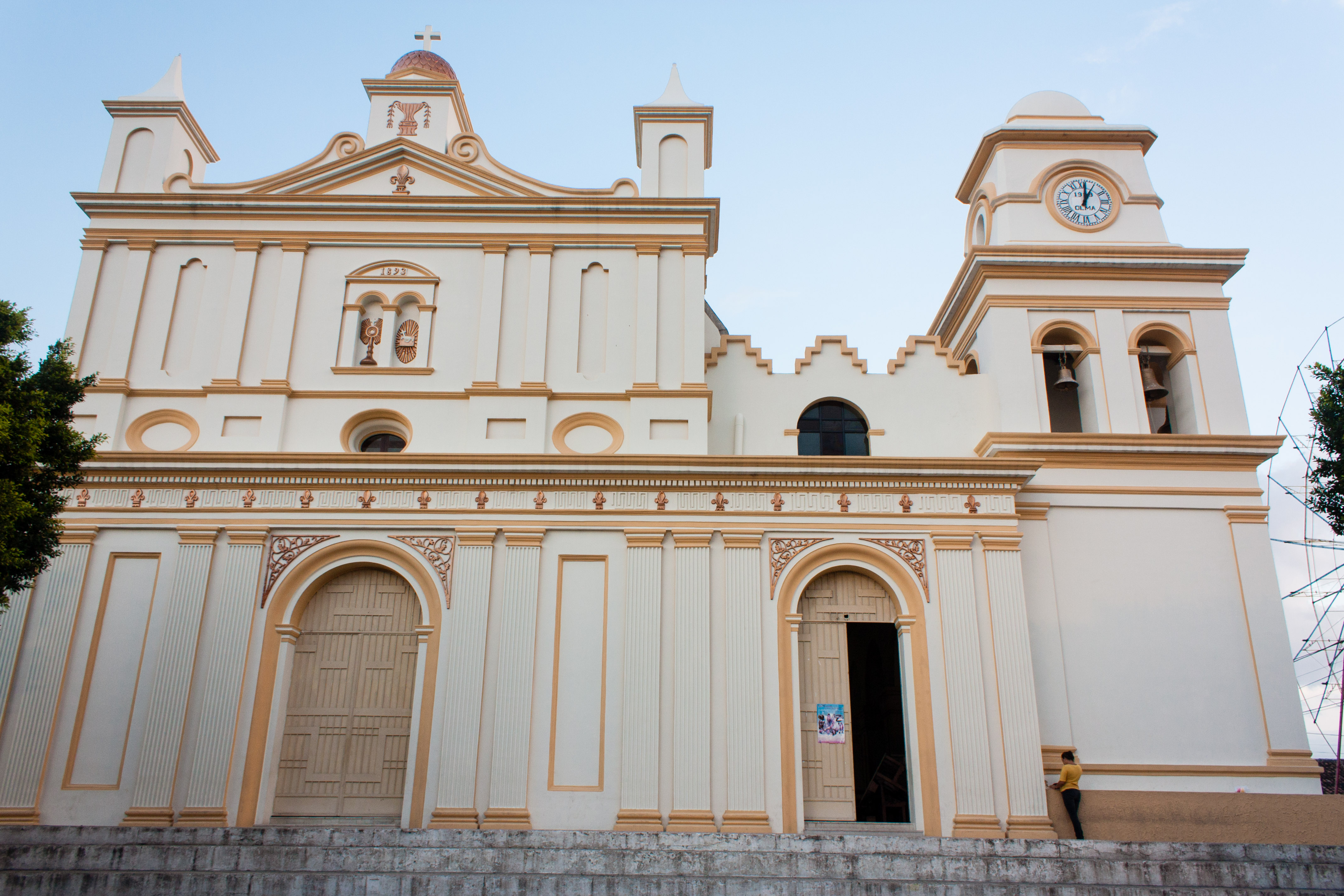
- Cathedral

Location
- Country: El Salvador
- Ecclesiastical province: Province of San Salvador
- Metropolitan: José Luis Escobar Alas

Statistics
- Area: 2,600 km^{2} (1,000 sq mi)
- Population: Total; Catholics: (as of 2006); 271,000; 244,000 (90%)
- Parishes: 23

Information
- Denomination: Catholic Church
- Sui iuris church: Latin Church
- Rite: Roman Rite
- Established: 30 December 1987 (37 years ago)
- Cathedral: St. John the Baptist Cathedral

Current leadership
- Pope: Leo XIV
- Bishop: Oswaldo Estéfano Escobar Aguilar, OCD (formerly, President of the Conference of Religious of El Salvador [CONFRES])
- Bishops emeritus: Luis Morao Andreazza, OFM

Map
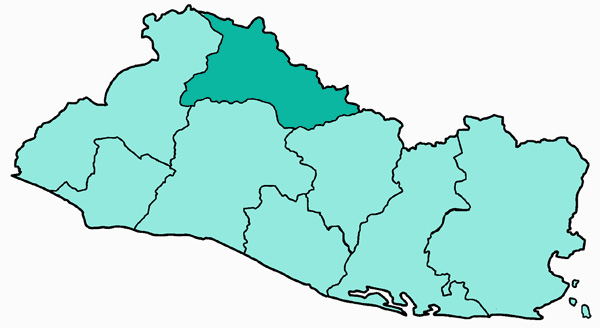

The Diocese of Chalatenango is a Latin Church ecclesiastical territory or diocese of the Catholic Church in El Salvador. It is a suffragan diocese in the ecclesiastical province of the metropolitan Archdiocese of San Salvador. The Diocese of Chalatenango was erected on 30 December 1987.

== Ordinaries ==
- Eduardo Alas Alfaro (1987–2007)
- Luis Morao Andreazza, OFM (2007–2016)
- Oswaldo Estéfano Escobar Aguilar, OCD (July 14, 2016 – present); formerly, President of the Conference of Religious of El Salvador (CONFRES)

== See also ==
- List of Roman Catholic dioceses in El Salvador
