= Oswaldo Estéfano Escobar Aguilar =

Salvadoran Catholic bishop

Oswaldo Estéfano Escobar Aguilar OCD
- Bishop of Chalatenango
- Church: Catholic Church
- Diocese: Chalatenango
- Installed: 14 July 2016
- Predecessor: Luis Morao Andreazza

Orders
- Ordination: 19 March 1996
- Consecration: 1 October 2016

Personal details
- Born: 20 May 1968 (age 58) Chalatenango, El Salvador
- Denomination: Catholicism

Oswaldo Estéfano Escobar Aguilar OCD (born 20 May 1968) is a Discalced Carmelite and bishop in the Catholic Church. He serves as the bishop of the Diocese of Chalatenango.

== Biography ==
Oswaldo Estéfano Escobar Aguilar was born on 20 Mary 1968 in Chalatenango, El Salvador. He became a member of the Discalced Carmelites in Guatemala in 1995 and attended the Francisco Marroquín University. Escobar was ordained as a priest on 19 March 1996. He later attended the International Teresian-Sanjuanist Center in Spain and the Pontifical Faculty of the Teresianum in Italy.

Escobar was a prior in San Ramón, Costa Rica from 1996 to 1999; prior and formator of Guatemalan philosophy students from 2002 to 2003; postulant formator in San Ramón; and the parish priest of Lauterique, Honduras from 2004 to 2006. From 2013 to 2016, Escobar was the provincial superior of Central America. From 2014 to 2016, he was also the president of the Religious Conference of El Salvador. On 14 July 2016, Pope Francis announced Escobar's installation as Bishop of Chalatenango, succeeding Bishop Luis Morao Andreazza who was retiring. Escobar was consecrated on 1 October 2016.

Catholic Church titles
Preceded by Luis Morao Andreazza	— TITULAR — Bishop of Chalatenango; 2016–present	Incumbent
