= San José Cancasque =

- District
- Location in El Salvador
- Coordinates: 13°59′N 88°51′W
- Country: El Salvador
- Department: Chalatenango
- Municipality: Chalatenango Sur

Area
  - District: 13.87 sq mi (35.92 km^{2})
- Elevation: 840 ft (256 m)

Population (2024)
  - District: 1,907
  - Rank: 249th in El Salvador
  - Rural: 1,907

San José Cancasque is a district in the Chalatenango Department of El Salvador.

== Geography ==
The community is located to the south of the city of Chalatenango. It is a neighbour to the communities of San Isidro Labrador to the North and Potonico and San Miguel de Mercedes located to the East. Lake Suchitlán is located a few kilometers to the South.

== Economy ==
Most of the residents of San Jose Cancasque are employed as rural labourers and livestock farmers.
