= San Miguel de Mercedes =

- District
- Location in El Salvador
- Coordinates: 14°1′N 88°56′W
- Country: El Salvador
- Department: Chalatenango
- Municipality: Chalatenango Sur
- Elevation: 1,549 ft (472 m)

Population (2024)
  - District: 2,492
  - Rank: 243rd in El Salvador
  - Rural: 2,492

San Miguel de Mercedes is a district in the Chalatenango Department of El Salvador.
