= El Salvador =

Country in Central America

Republic of El Salvador República de El Salvador (Spanish)
- Flag Coat of arms
- Motto: Dios, Unión, Libertad "God, Union, Liberty"
- Anthem: Himno Nacional de El Salvador "National Anthem of El Salvador"
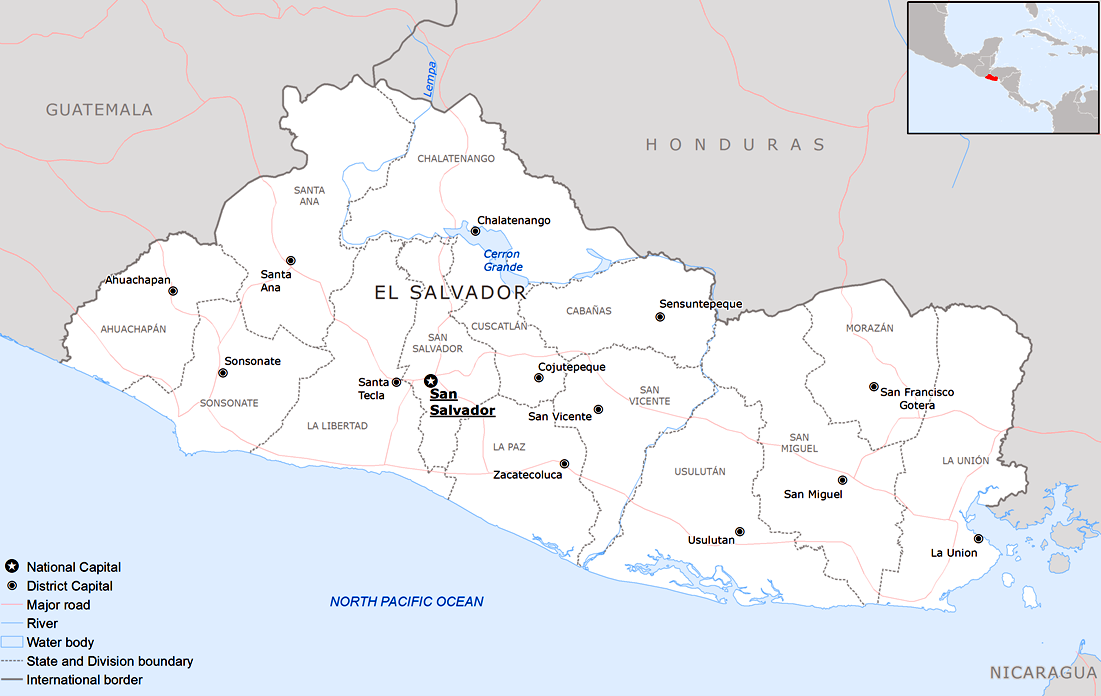
- Capital and largest city: San Salvador; 13°42′N 89°12′W
- Official languages: Spanish (Note: The official language of El Salvador is established in the Article 62 of the Constitution of 1983 to be Castilian.)
- Recognized languages: Nawat (Note: English is also an academic language in public schools. For more information, see Languages of El Salvador.)
- Ethnic groups (2007): 86.3% Mestizo (mixed White and Indigenous); 12.7% White; 0.2% Indigenous; 0.1% Black; 0.6% other
- Religion (2022): 81.5% Christianity; 42.2% Catholicism; 36.6% Protestantism; 2.7% other Christian; 17% no religion; 1.5% other
- Demonym: Salvadoran
- Government: Unitary presidential republic
  - President: Nayib Bukele
  - Vice President: Félix Ulloa
- Legislature: Legislative Assembly

Independence
  - Declared from Spain: 15 September 1821
  - Declared from the First Mexican Empire: 1 July 1823
  - Declared from the Federal Republic of Central America: 30 January 1841
  - International recognition: 18 February 1841

Area
  - Total: 21,041 km^{2} (8,124 sq mi) (149th)
  - Water (%): 1.5

Population
  - 2024 census: ▲6,029,976 (114th)
  - Density: 286.6/km^{2} (742.3/sq mi) (46th)
- GDP (PPP): 2025 estimate
  - Total: ▲$88.323 billion (107th)
  - Per capita: ▲$13,753 (114th)
- GDP (nominal): 2025 estimate
  - Total: ▲$37.843 billion (104th)
  - Per capita: ▲$5,893 (108th)
- Gini (2022): 38.8 medium inequality
- HDI (2023): ▲0.678 medium (132nd)
- Currency: United States dollar (USD; since 2001); Salvadoran colón (no longer in circulation, still legal); (Note: The U.S. dollar is the main currency in use. Financial information can be expressed in U.S. dollars and in Salvadoran colóns, but the colón is out of circulation. Bitcoin was designated as legal tender from 2021 to 2025.)
- Time zone: UTC−6 (CST)
- Date format: dd/mm/yyyy
- Calling code: +503 (Note: Telephone companies (market share): Tigo (45%), Claro (25%), Movistar (24%), Digicel (5.5%), Red (0.5%).)
- ISO 3166 code: SV
- Internet TLD: .sv

El Salvador, (Note: /ɛl ˈsælvədɔːr/; Spanish: [el salβaˈðoɾ], meaning "The Saviour") officially the Republic of El Salvador, (Note: Spanish: República de El Salvador) is a sovereign nation in Central America. Situated along the Pacific coast, it is bounded by Guatemala to the northwest and Honduras to the northeast. The country's political, economic, and cultural center is its capital and largest city, San Salvador. As of 2024, El Salvador's population was estimated at approximately 6 million inhabitants.

Historically, the territory comprising modern-day El Salvador was inhabited by various Mesoamerican civilizations, notably the Olmecs - whose presence around the first millennium BCE is attested by archeological monuments - followed by the Maya and later the Cuzcatlecs. In 1524, the region was conquered by the Spanish Empire and subsequently incorporated into the Viceroyalty of New Spain. Because the central administration in Mexico City exercised limited direct oversight over the Central American isthmus, Spain established the Captaincy General of Guatemala in 1609, an administrative division that included the territory of El Salvador throughout the colonial period.

Following its independence from Spain in 1821, El Salvador was briefly annexed by the First Mexican Empire before seceding to join the Federal Republic of Central America in 1823. Upon the dissolution of the federation in 1841, El Salvador established full sovereignty as an independent republic. Late in the 19th century, the nation temporarily reunited with Honduras and Nicaragua to form the Greater Republic of Central America, a political union that endured from 1896 to 1898. From the late 19th through the mid-20th century, El Salvador experienced prolonged political and economic instability, marked by frequent military coups, civil unrest, and a succession of authoritarian regimes. Entrenched socioeconomic disparities and escalating conflict eventually culminated in the Salvadoran Civil War (1979-1992), fought between the military-led government and the Farabundo Martí National Liberation Front (FMLN), a coalition of left-wing guerrilla groups. The war concluded with the signing of the Chapultepec Peace Accords in 1992. This negotiated settlement demilitarized the opposition, reformed the security forces, and established a multiparty constitutional republic. The conflict and its economic aftermath triggered mass emigration, primarily to the United States. Between 1980 and 2008, nearly one million citizens migrated to the U.S., establishing Salvadorans as the sixth-largest immigrant population in the nation by 2008.

Historically, the economy of El Salvador was driven primarily by agricultural export commodities. During the 16th century, Spanish colonial authorities commercialized indigenous cacao production, centered around Izalco, alongside balsam harvested from the coastal ranges of La Libertad and Ahuachapán. By the 19th century, indigo emerged as the primary export due to global demands for natural dyes, before being superseded by coffee in the early 20th century, which at its peak generated roughly 90% of national export revenues. In subsequent decades, the country systematically diversified its economic base by expanding manufacturing, broadening trade partnerships and developing financial links, thereby reducing its historical reliance on coffee. In 2001, El Salvador replaced its national currency, the colón (in circulation since 1892), with the United States dollar.

Socioeconomic indicators from the late 2010s reflected that El Salvador maintained one of the lowest levels of income inequality in Central America. Concurrently, international studies assessing economic complexity ranked the country among the less complex market systems globally for commercial enterprise. For decades, crime and gangs were a serious issue in El Salvador, with the country having one of the highest homicide rates in the world, until a gang crackdown from 2022, drastically reducing crime but leading to one of the highest incarceration rates in the world.

== Etymology ==
After the Spanish conquest, the land was divided into the Province of San Salvador, the Spanish version of "Holy Saviour", a biblical title for Jesus. From 1579, it included the province of San Miguel (Saint Michael). Throughout the colonial era, El Salvador was an alcaldía mayor ('great mayor's office'), an intendancy, a province with a provincial council, and the province of Izalco; later called the mayor's office of Sonsonate. In 1824, the two jurisdictions were united in the State of Salvador, a part of the Federal Republic of Central America.

After the dissolution of the Federal Republic of Central America, the country was referred to as the Republic of Salvador (República del Salvador). In 1915, the Legislative Assembly passed a law which stated that the country's name should be rendered as the definite form El Salvador ('The Saviour') — again a reference to Jesus — rather than Salvador. With another law passed in 1958, the legislature reaffirmed the country's name as El Salvador.

== History ==
=== Prehistoric ===
During the Pleistocene epoch, the region was inhabited by extinct megafauna, including the giant ground sloth Eremotherium, the toxodontid Mixotoxodon, the gomphothere Cuvieronius, the glyptodont Glyptotherium, the camelid Hemiauchenia, and the prehistoric horse Equus conversidens. Archeological evidence, particularly fluted stone projectile points discovered in western El Salvador, incidicates that human settlement likely dates back to the Paleoindian period.

=== Pre-Columbian era ===
Archaeological research into pre-Columbian El Salvador remains limited, largely due to high population density restricting excavation opportunities and historical volcanic activity blanketing potential sites under thick layers of ash. Consequently, data regarding early human settlements —particularly those from Preclassic Period and preceding eras— remains sparse.

A notable archaeological site in western El Salvador is Tazumal, which was first settled around 1200 BC, and became a major urban settlement on the periphery of the Maya civilization during the Preclassic Period and was heavily involved in the trading of valuable items like ceramics, obsidian, cacao and hematite. The settlement was heavily damaged around 430 AD by a volcanic eruption, after which it never regained its former prominence. Another major pre-Columbian settlement is Cara Sucia in the far west of the country, which began as a small settlement around 800 BC at the beginning of the Middle Preclassic. During the Late Classic (600–900 AD), Cara Sucia emerged as a major urban settlement, before being abruptly destroyed during the 10th century.

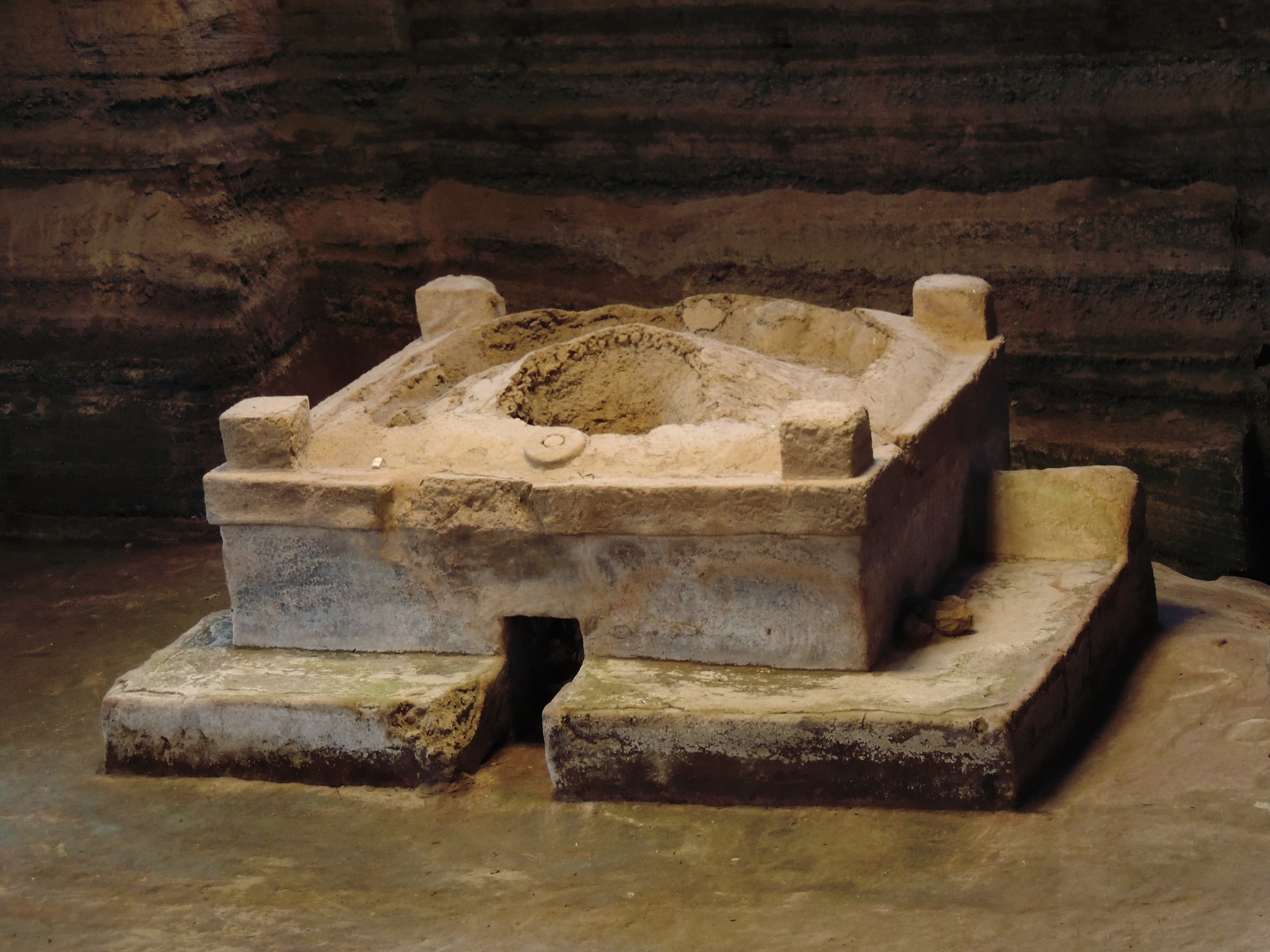
A temazcal in Joya de Cerén

The Pipil people, Nahua speaking groups originally from Central Mexico, migrated beginning around 800 AD and occupied the central and western regions of El Salvador. The Nahua Pipil were the last indigenous people to arrive in El Salvador. They called their territory Kuskatan, a Nawat word meaning "The Place of Precious Jewels", back-formed into Classical Nahuatl Cōzcatlān, and commonly known as Cuzcatlan. It was the largest domain in Salvadoran territory up until European contact. The term Cuzcatleco is commonly used to identify someone of Salvadoran heritage, although the majority of the eastern population has an indigenous heritage of Lenca origin, as do their place names such as Intipuca, Chirilagua, and Lolotique.

Most of the archaeological sites in western El Salvador, such as Lago de Guija and Joya De Ceren indicate a pre-Columbian Mayan culture. Cihuatan shows signs of material trade with northern Nahua culture, eastern Mayan and Lenca culture, and southern Nicaraguan and Costa Rican indigenous culture. Tazumal's smaller B1-2 structure shows a talud-tablero style of architecture that is associated with Nahua culture and corresponds with their migration history from Anahuac. In eastern El Salvador, the Lenca site of Quelepa is highlighted as a major pre-Columbian cultural centre and demonstrates links to the Mayan site of Copan in western Honduras as well as the previously mentioned sites in Chalchuapa, and Cara Sucia in western El Salvador. An investigation of the site of La Laguna in Usulutan has also produced Copador items that link it to the Lenca-Maya trade route.

=== European arrival (1522) ===
By 1521, the indigenous population of the Mesoamerican area had been drastically reduced by the smallpox epidemic that was spreading throughout the territory, although it had not yet reached pandemic levels in Cuzcatlán or the northern portion Managuara. The first known visit by Spaniards to what is now Salvadoran territory was made by the admiral Andrés Niño, who led an expedition to Central America. He disembarked in the Gulf of Fonseca on 31 May 1522, at Meanguera island, naming it Petronila, and then traversed to Jiquilisco Bay on the mouth of Lempa River. The first indigenous people to have contact with the Spanish were the Lenca of eastern El Salvador.

==== Conquest of Cuzcatlán and Managuara ====
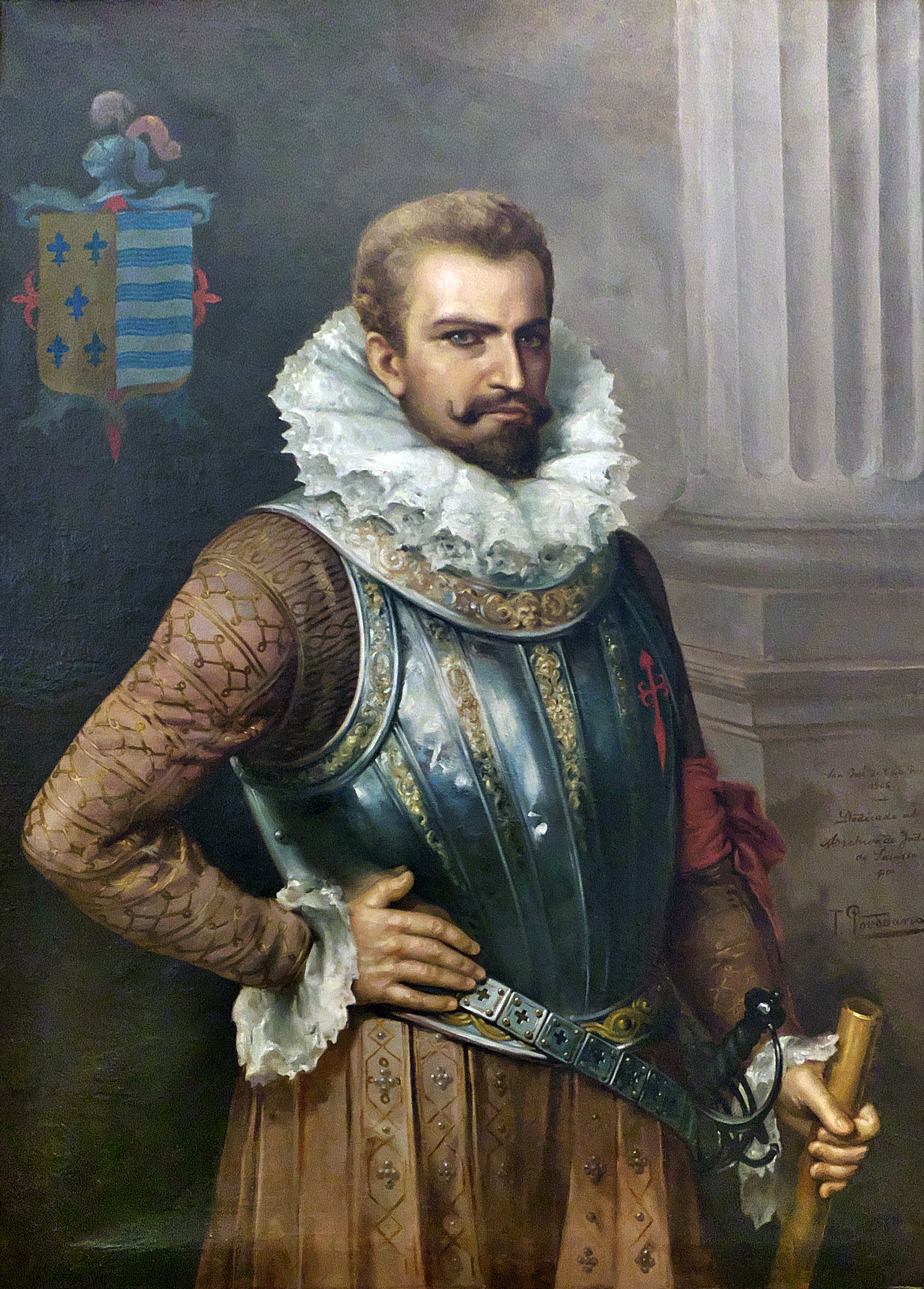
Spanish Conquistador Pedro de Alvarado

In 1524, after participating in the conquest of the Aztec Empire, Pedro de Alvarado, his brother Gonzalo, and their men crossed the Rio Paz southwards into Cuzcatlec territory. Upon their arrival, Spaniards were disappointed to discover that the Pipil had little gold compared to what they had found in Guatemala or Mexico. The small amount of gold that was available had to be panned so that it could be obtained. Eventually, the Spaniards recognized the richness of the land's volcanic soil. Following this discovery, the Spanish crown began granting land based on the terms of the encomienda system.

Pedro Alvarado led the first incursion to extend their dominion to the domain of Cuzcatlan in June 1524. When he arrived at the borders of the kingdom, he saw that civilians had been evacuated. Cuzcatlec warriors moved to the coastal city of Acajutla and waited for Alvarado and his forces. Alvarado approached, confident that the result would be similar to what occurred in Mexico and Guatemala. He thought he would easily deal with this new indigenous force since the Mexican allies on his side and the Pipil spoke a similar language.

Alvarado described the Cuzcatlec soldiers as having shields decorated with colourful exotic feathers, a vest-like armour made of three inch cotton which arrows could not penetrate, and long spears. Both armies suffered many casualties, with a wounded Alvarado retreating and losing a lot of his men, especially among the Mexican Indian auxiliaries. Once his army had regrouped, Alvarado decided to head to the Cuzcatlan capital and again faced armed Cuzcatlec. Wounded, unable to fight and hiding in the cliffs, Alvarado sent his Spanish men on their horses to approach the Cuzcatlec to see if they would fear the horses, but they did not retreat, Alvarado recalls in his letters to Hernán Cortés.

The Cuzcatlec attacked again, and on this occasion stole Spanish weaponry. Alvarado retreated and sent Mexican messengers to demand that the Cuzcatlec warriors return the stolen weapons and surrender to their opponent's king. The Cuzcatlec responded with the famous response, "If you want your weapons, come get them". As days passed, Alvarado, fearing an ambush, sent more Mexican messengers to negotiate, but these messengers never came back and were presumably executed.

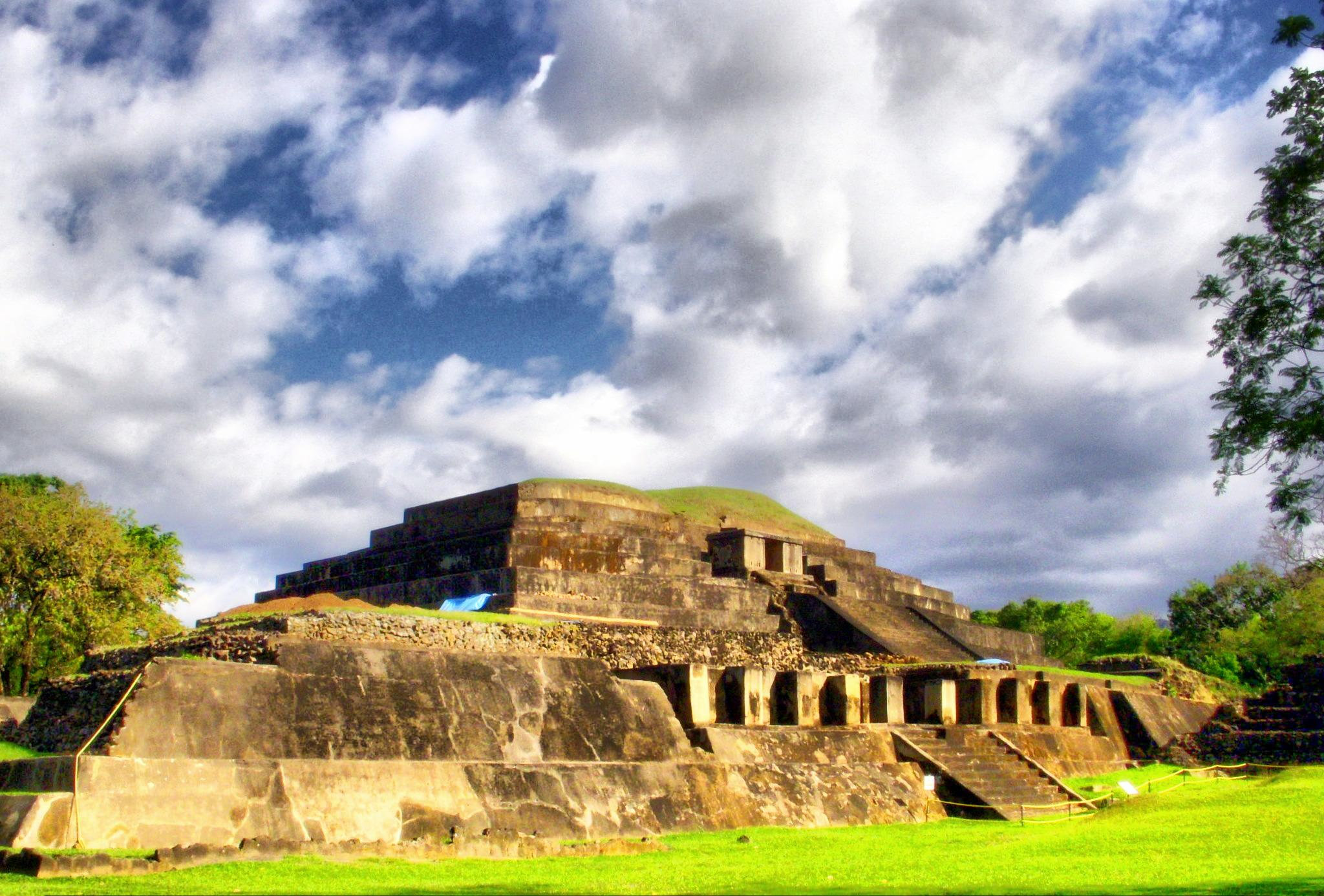
Tazumal, built between AD 250–1200, a Maya site in Santa Ana Department

The Spanish efforts were firmly resisted by Pipil and their Mayan-speaking neighbours. They defeated the Spaniards and what was left of their Tlaxcalan allies, forcing them to withdraw to Guatemala. After being wounded, Alvarado abandoned the war and appointed his brother, Gonzalo de Alvarado, to continue the task. Two subsequent expeditions (the first in 1525, followed by a smaller group in 1528) brought the Pipil under Spanish control, since the Pipil also were weakened by a regional epidemic of smallpox. In 1525, the conquest of Cuzcatlán was completed and the city of San Salvador was established. The Spanish faced much resistance from the Pipil and were not able to reach eastern El Salvador, the area of the Lencas.

In 1526, the Spanish founded the garrison town of San Miguel in northern Managuara—territory of the Lenca, headed by another explorer and conquistador, Luis de Moscoso Alvarado, nephew of Pedro Alvarado. Oral history holds that a Maya-Lenca crown princess, Antu Silan Ulap I, organized resistance to the conquistadors. The commonwealth of the Lenca was alarmed by de Moscoso's invasion, and Antu Silan travelled from village to village, uniting all the Lenca towns in present-day El Salvador and Honduras against the Spaniards. Through surprise attacks and overwhelming numbers, they were able to drive the Spanish out of San Miguel and destroy the garrison.

For ten years the Lencas prevented the Spanish from building a permanent settlement. Then the Spanish returned with more soldiers, including about 2,000 forced conscripts from indigenous communities in Guatemala. They pursued the Lenca leaders further up into the mountains of Intibucá.

Antu Silan Ulap eventually handed over control of the Lenca resistance to Lempira (also called Empira). Lempira was noteworthy among indigenous leaders in that he mocked the Spanish by wearing their clothes after capturing them and using their weapons captured in battle. Lempira fought in command of thousands of Lenca forces for six more years in Managuara until he was killed in battle. The remaining Lenca forces retreated into the hills. The Spanish were then able to rebuild their garrison town of San Miguel in 1537.

=== Colonial period (1525–1821) ===
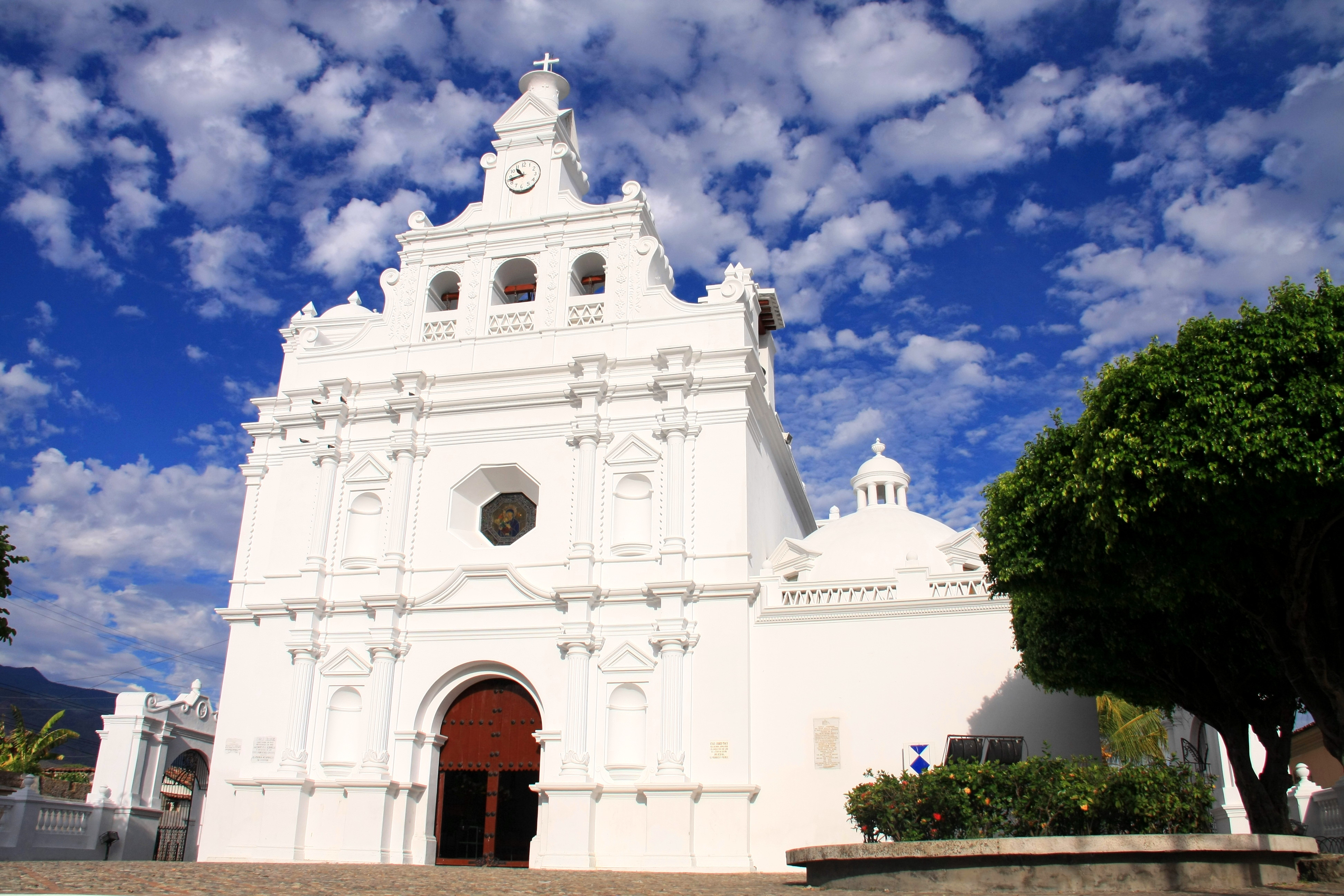
Colonial Church of San Pedro Apóstol in Metapán, built between 1736 and 1743

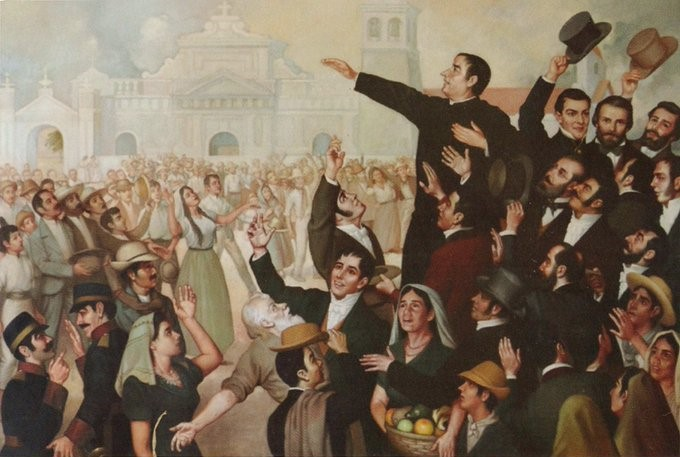
A painting of the First Independence Movement celebration in San Salvador. At the centre, José Matías Delgado.

During the colonial period, San Salvador and San Miguel were part of the Captaincy General of Guatemala, also known as the Kingdom of Guatemala (Spanish: Reino de Guatemala), created in 1609 as an administrative division of New Spain. The Salvadoran territory was administered by the mayor of Sonsonate, with San Salvador being established as an intendencia in 1786.

Beginning in the late sixteenth century, the cultivation of indigo became a major part of the Salvadoran economy, spreading particularly in the center, east, and along the coast, along with other cash crops such as sugar. The hazardous working conditions on indigo plantations in conjunction with the aggressive recruitment of labor from villages, disease brought by Spaniards, and the loss of communal lands (ejidos) led to a gradual decline in the indigenous populations of these regions over the course of the colonial period, as their communities disintegrated and they assimilated into Ladino society. The northern border regions of the country experienced a similar phenomenon due to the spread of cattle ranching. On the other hand, indigenous communities survived more intact in the west of the country, where the economy was based around cacao and balsam and protected from cattle ranching and disease, allowing the preservation of indigenous agriculture and by consequence their social structures, language and identity.

In 1811, a combination of internal and external factors motivated Central American elites to attempt to gain independence from the Spanish Crown. The most important internal factors were the desire of local elites to control the country's affairs free of involvement from Spanish authorities, and the long-standing Creole aspiration for independence. The main external factors motivating the independence movement were the success of the French and American revolutions in the 18th century, and the weakening of the Spanish Crown's military power as a result of the Napoleonic Wars, with the resulting inability to control its colonies effectively.

In November 1811, Salvadoran priest José Matías Delgado rang the bells of Iglesia La Merced in San Salvador, calling for insurrection and launching the 1811 Independence Movement. This insurrection was suppressed, and many of its leaders were arrested and served sentences in jail. Another insurrection was launched in 1814, which was also suppressed.

=== Independence (1821) ===
In 1821, in light of unrest in Guatemala, Spanish authorities capitulated and signed the Act of Independence of Central America, which released all of the Captaincy General of Guatemala (comprising current territories of Guatemala, El Salvador, Honduras, Nicaragua and Costa Rica and the Mexican state of Chiapas) from Spanish rule and declared its independence. In 1821, El Salvador joined Costa Rica, Guatemala, Honduras and Nicaragua in a union named the Federal Republic of Central America.

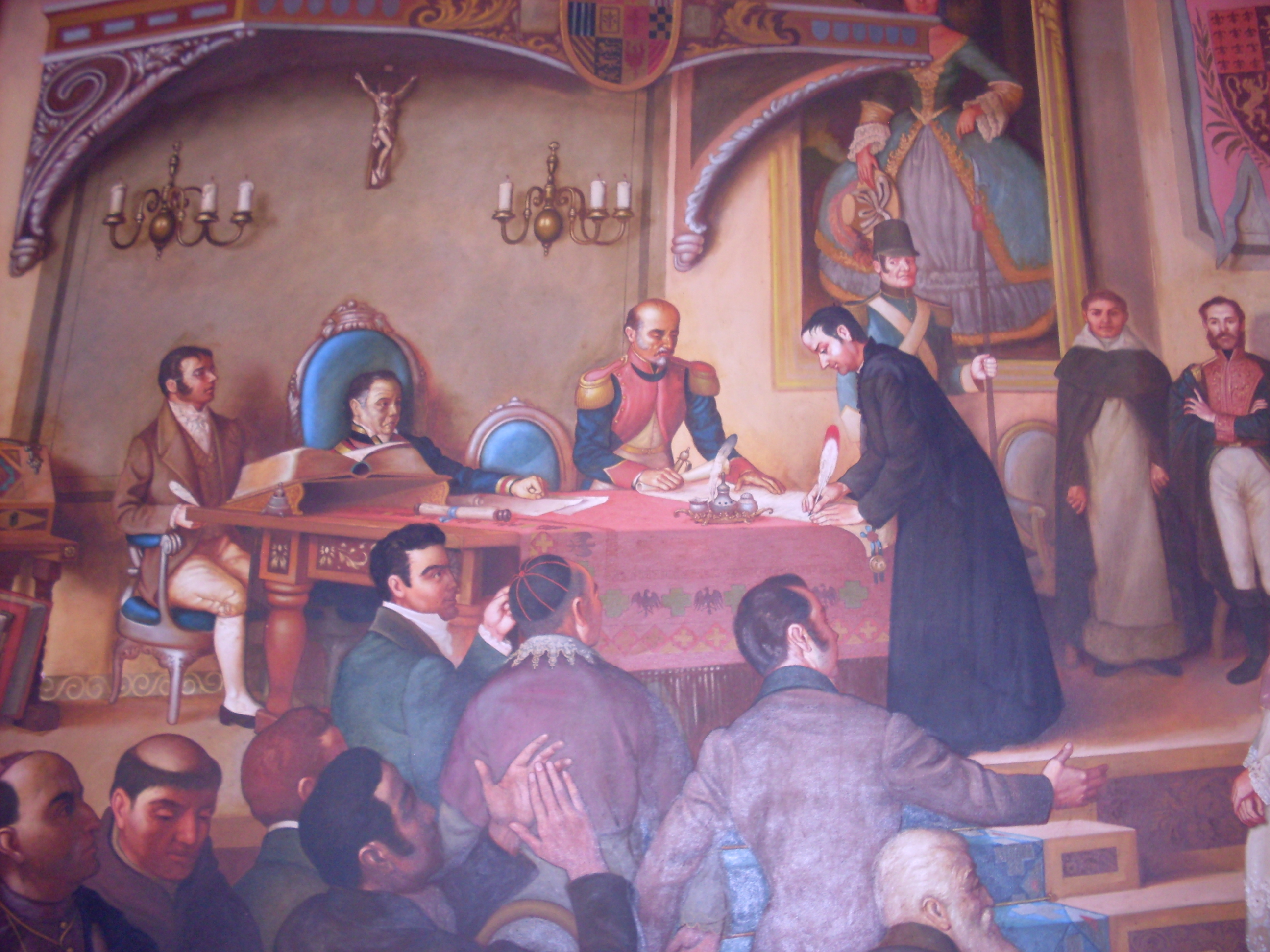
José Matías Delgado signing the Act of Independence of Central America, 15 September 1821

In early 1822, the authorities of the newly independent Central American provinces, meeting in Guatemala City, voted to join the newly constituted First Mexican Empire under Agustín de Iturbide. El Salvador resisted, insisting on autonomy for the Central American countries. A Mexican military detachment marched to San Salvador and suppressed dissent, but with the fall of Iturbide on 19 March 1823, the army decamped back to Mexico.

Shortly thereafter, the authorities of the provinces revoked the vote to join Mexico, deciding instead to form a federal union of the five remaining provinces (Chiapas permanently joined Mexico at this juncture) known as the Federal Republic of Central America. El Salvador declared its independence from the Federal Republic of Central America on 30 January 1841. El Salvador joined Honduras and Nicaragua in 1896 to form the Greater Republic of Central America, which dissolved in 1898.

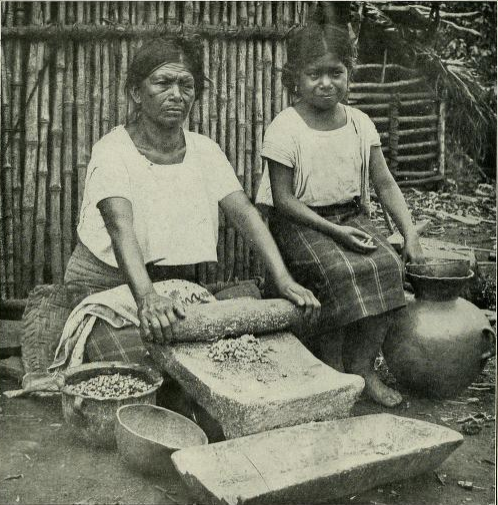
A woman and a girl in El Salvador making bread, 1910

After the mid-19th century, the economy was based on coffee growing. As the world market for indigo withered away, the economy prospered or suffered as the world coffee price fluctuated. The enormous profits that coffee yielded as a monoculture export served as an impetus for the concentration of land into the hands of an oligarchy of just a few families.

Throughout the last half of the 19th century, a succession of presidents from the ranks of the Salvadoran oligarchy, nominally both conservative and liberal, generally agreed on the promotion of coffee as the predominant cash crop, the development of infrastructure (railroads and port facilities) primarily in support of the coffee trade, the elimination of communal landholdings to facilitate further coffee production, the passage of anti-vagrancy laws to ensure that displaced campesinos and other rural residents provided sufficient labour for the coffee fincas (plantations), and the suppression of rural discontent. In 1912, the national guard was created as a rural police force.

=== 20th century ===
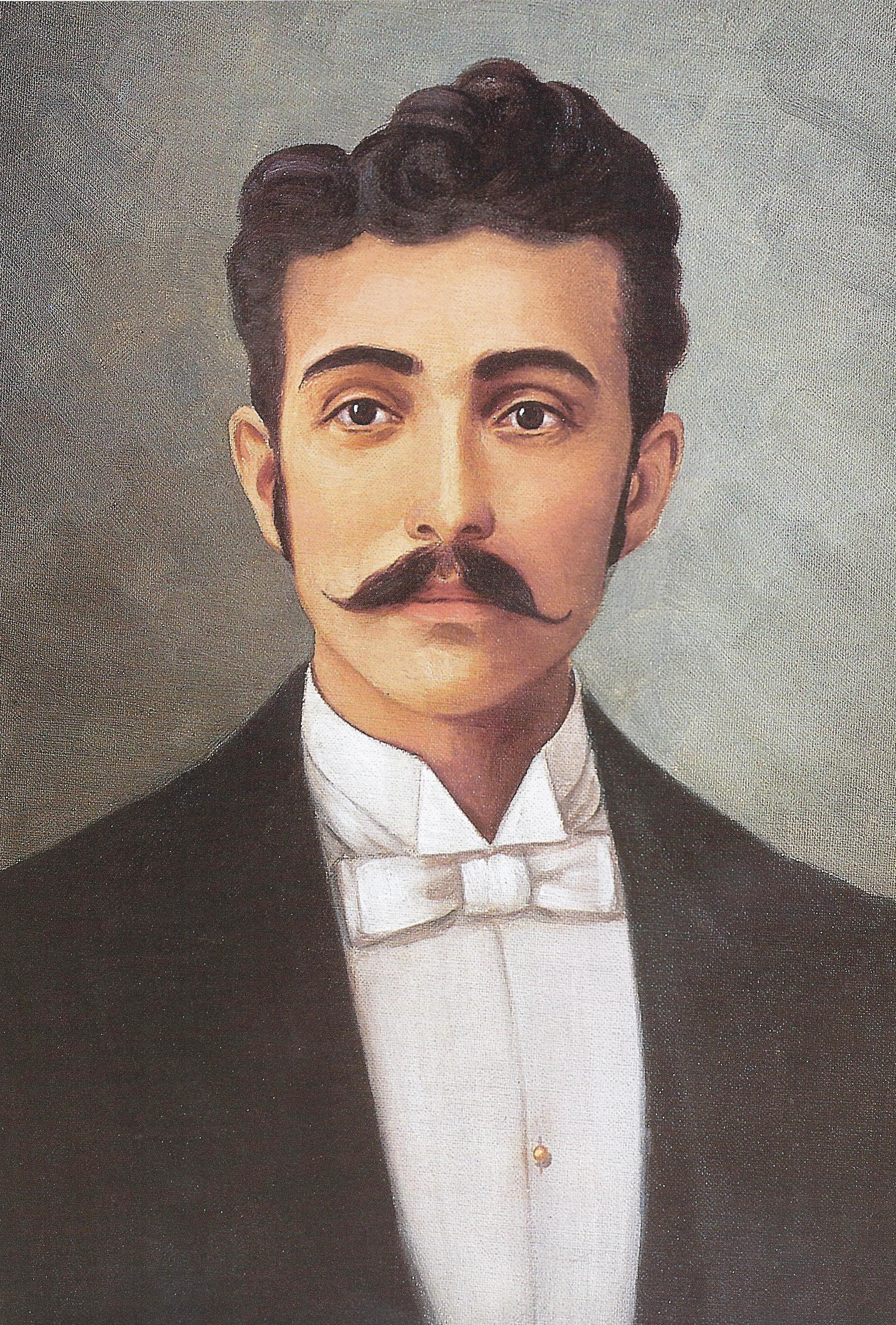
Gen. Tomás Regalado

In 1898, General Tomás Regalado gained power by force, deposing General Rafael Antonio Gutiérrez and ruling as president until 1903. Once in office he revived the practice of presidents designating their successors. After serving his term, he remained active in the Salvadoran Army and was killed on 11 July 1906, at El Jicaro, during a war against Guatemala. Until 1913 El Salvador was politically stable, with undercurrents of popular discontent. When President Manuel Enrique Araujo was killed in 1913, many hypotheses were advanced for the political motive of his murder.

Manuel Enrique Araujo's administration was followed by the Meléndez–Quiñónez dynasty that lasted from 1913 to 1927. Pío Romero Bosque, a former minister and a trusted collaborator of the dynasty, succeeded President Alfonso Quiñónez Molina, and in 1930 announced free elections, in which Arturo Araujo came to power on 1 March 1931, in what was considered the country's first freely contested election. His government lasted only nine months before it was overthrown by junior military officers, who accused his Salvadoran Laborist Party of lacking political and governmental experience and of using its government offices inefficiently. Arturo Araujo faced general popular discontent, as the people had expected economic reforms and the redistribution of land. There were demonstrations in front of the National Palace from the first week of his administration. His vice president and minister of war was General Maximiliano Hernández Martínez.

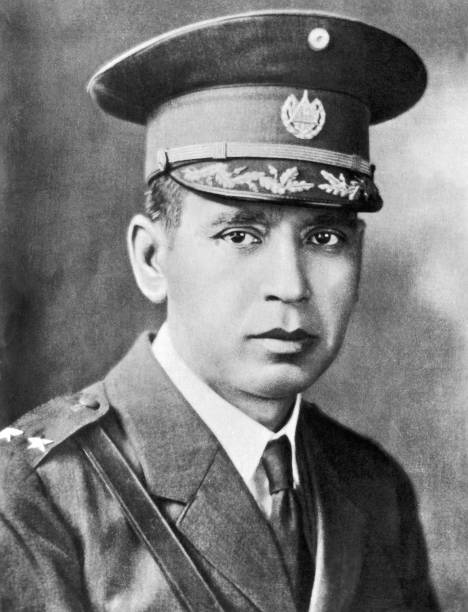
General Maximiliano Hernández Martínez, President of El Salvador (1931–1944)

In December 1931, a coup d'état was organized by junior officers and led by Martínez. Only the First Regiment of Cavalry and the National Police defended the presidency (the National Police had been on its payroll), but later that night, after hours of fighting, the badly outnumbered defenders surrendered to rebel forces. The Directorate, composed of officers, hid behind a shadowy figure, a rich anti-communist banker called Rodolfo Duke, and later installed the vice-president Martínez as president. The revolt was probably caused by the army's discontent at not having been paid by President Araujo for some months. Araujo left the National Palace and unsuccessfully tried to organize forces to defeat the revolt.

The U.S. Minister in El Salvador met with the Directorate and later recognized the government of Martínez, which agreed to hold presidential elections. He resigned six months before running for re-election, winning back the presidency as the only candidate on the ballot. He ruled from 1935 to 1939, then from 1939 to 1943. He began a fourth term in 1944 but resigned in May after a general strike. Martínez had said he was going to respect the constitution, which stipulated he could not be re-elected, but he refused to keep his promise.

==== La Matanza ====
Beginning in January 1932, there was brutal suppression of a rural revolt known as La Matanza. In the unstable political climate of the previous few years, social activist and revolutionary leader Farabundo Martí helped found the Communist Party of Central America, and led a communist alternative to the Red Cross, called "International Red Aid", serving as one of its representatives. Their goal was to help poor and underprivileged Salvadorans through the use of Marxist–Leninist ideology.

In December 1930, at the height of the country's economic and social depression, Martí was once again exiled because of his popularity among the nation's poor and rumours of his upcoming nomination for president the following year. Once Araujo was elected president in 1931, Martí returned to El Salvador and, along with Alfonso Luna and Mario Zapata, began the movement that was later truncated by the military.

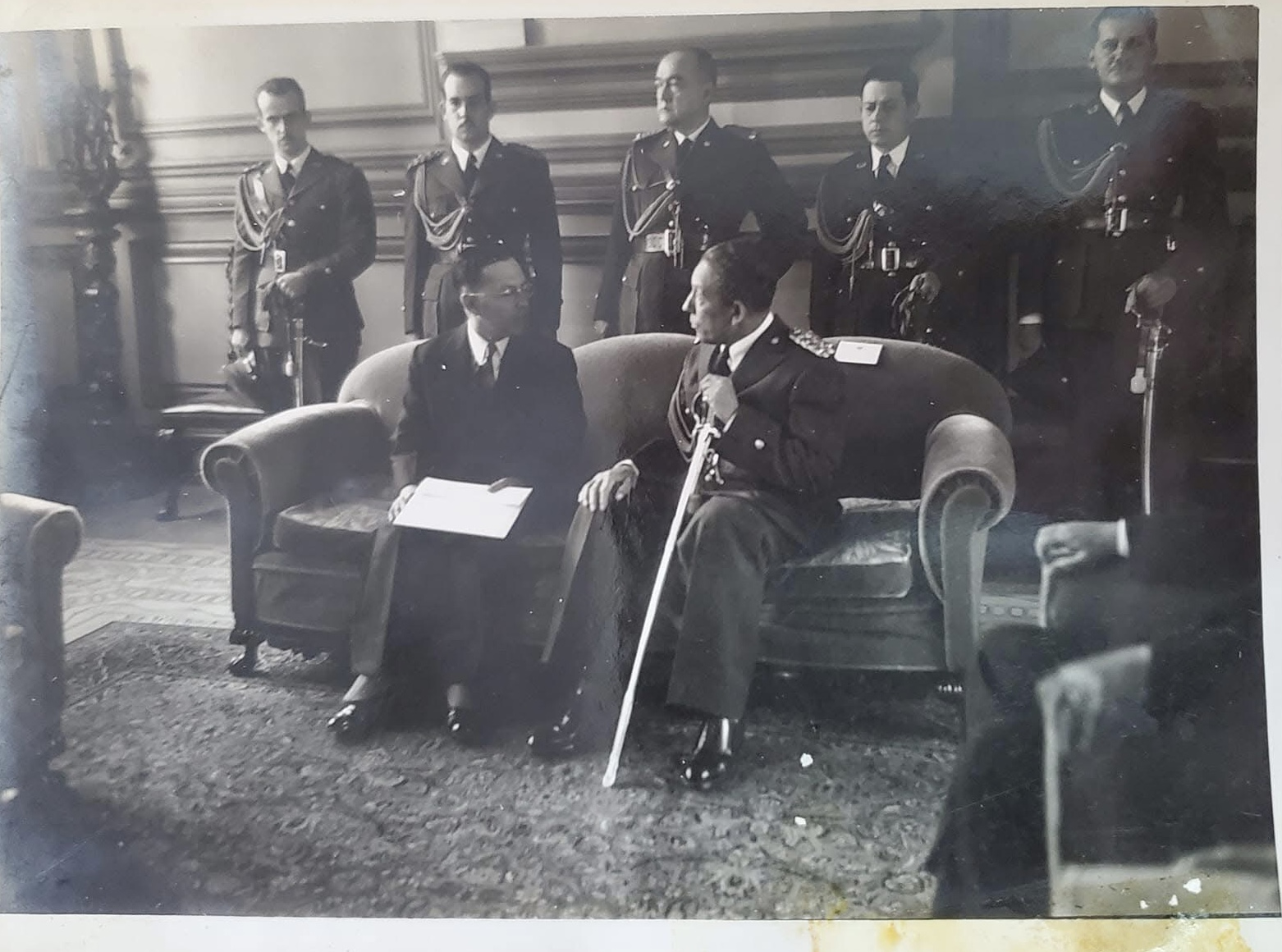
Salvador Castaneda Castro with his cabinet members 1940s.

On 22 January 1932, thousands of poorly armed peasants in the western part of El Salvador revolted against the government and Martínez. The rebellion occurred amid widespread unrest over suppression of democratic political freedoms following the cancellation of the results of the 1932 legislative election. The rebels were led by Feliciano Ama and Farabundo Martí and were largely composed of Indigenous people and communists. The rebellion made gains initially, capturing several towns and cities across the western part of the country, killing an estimated 2,000 people. The government suppressed the rebellion brutally, killing between 10,000 and 40,000 people, mostly Pipil peasants. Many of the rebellion's leaders, including Ama and Martí, were captured and executed.

Historically, the high Salvadoran population density has contributed to tensions with neighbouring Honduras, as land-poor Salvadorans emigrated to less densely populated Honduras and established themselves as squatters on unused or underused land. This phenomenon was a major cause of the 1969 Football War between the two countries. As many as 130,000 Salvadorans were forcibly expelled or fled from Honduras.

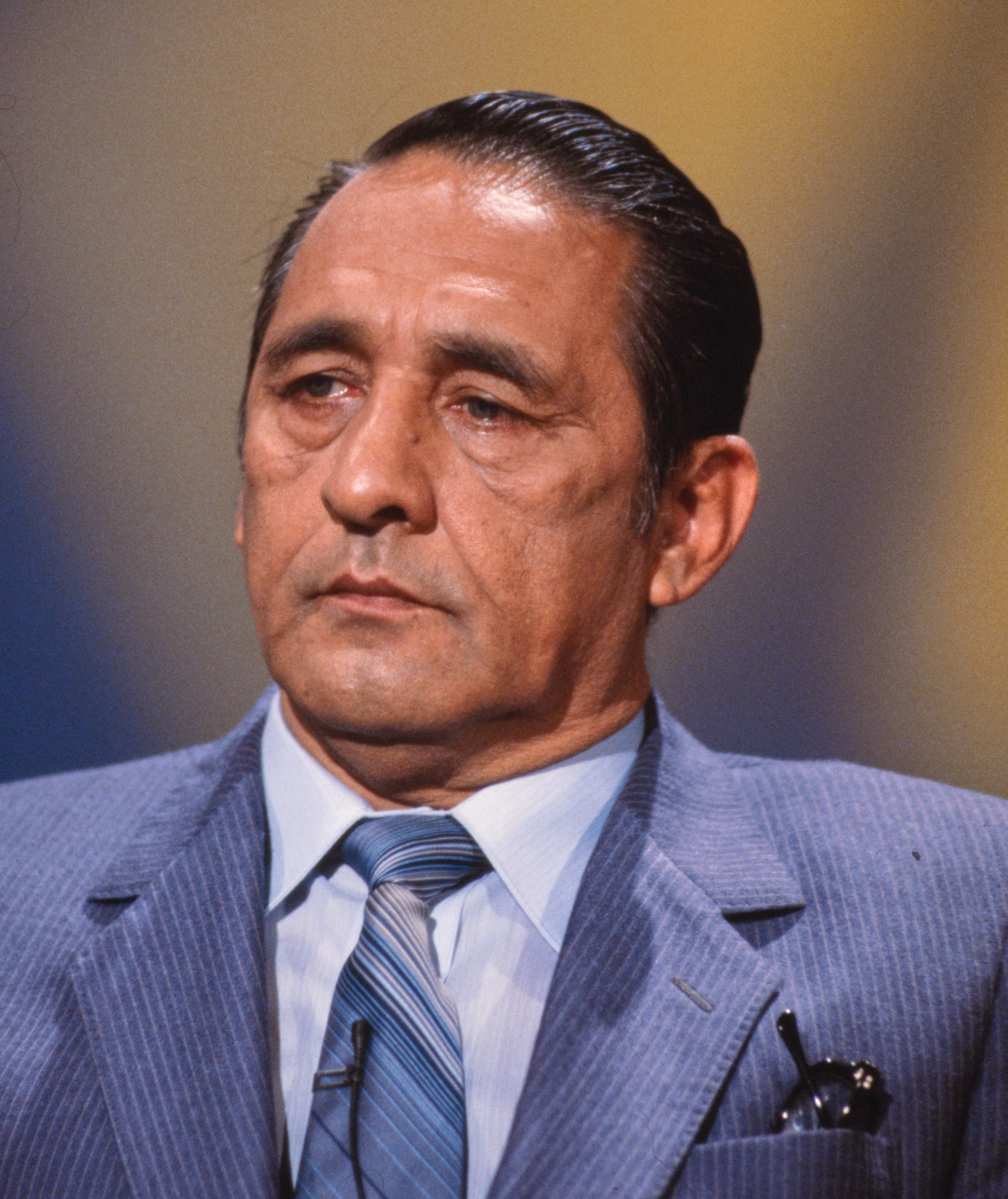
José Napoleón Duarte

The Christian Democratic Party (PDC) and the National Conciliation Party (PCN) were active in Salvadoran politics from 1960 until 2011, when they were disbanded by the Supreme Court because they had failed to win enough votes in the 2004 presidential election. Both parties have since reconstituted. They share common ideals, but one represents the middle class and the latter the interests of the Salvadoran military.

PDC leader José Napoleón Duarte was the mayor of San Salvador from 1964 to 1970, winning three elections during the regime of PCN president, Julio Adalberto Rivera Carballo, who allowed free elections for mayors and the National Assembly. Duarte later ran for president with a political grouping called the National Opposition Union (UNO) but was defeated in the 1972 presidential elections. He lost to the ex-minister of interior, Colonel Arturo Armando Molina, in an election that was widely viewed as fraudulent; Molina was declared the winner even though Duarte was said to have received a majority of the votes. Duarte, at some army officers' requests, supported a revolt to protest the election fraud, but was captured, tortured and later exiled. Duarte returned to the country in 1979 to enter politics after working on projects in Venezuela as an engineer.

=== Salvadoran Civil War (1979–1992) ===
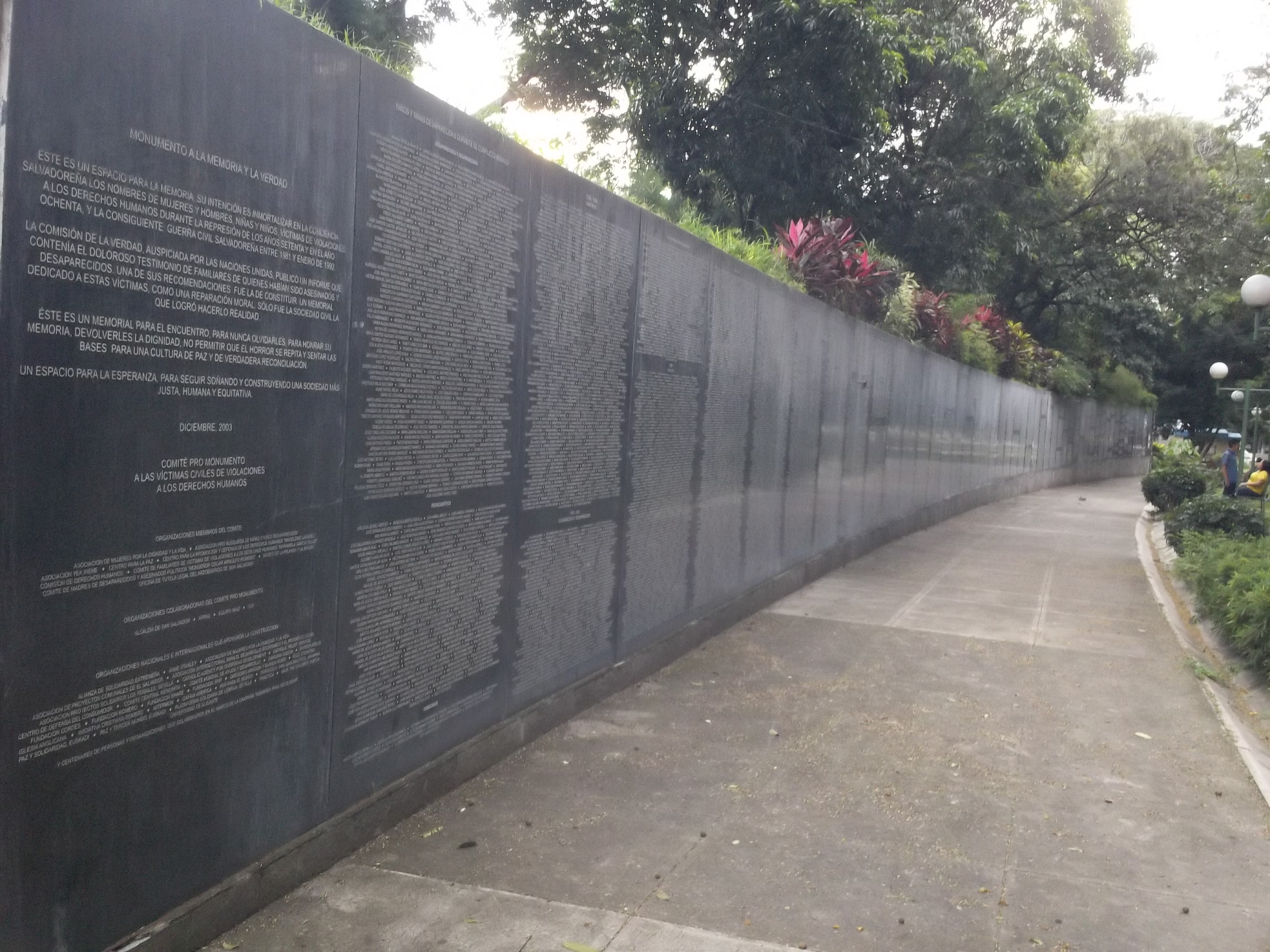
A monument carved in black marble which contains the names of thousands of victims of massacres that occurred during the civil war

Carlos Humberto Romero was the final president of the country's military dictatorship which began in 1931. The U.S. had been Romero's biggest supporter, but by October 1979, the Carter administration decided that El Salvador needed regime change.

On 15 October 1979, a coup d'état brought the Revolutionary Government Junta (JRG) to power. It nationalized many private companies and took over much privately owned land. The purpose of this new junta was to stop the revolutionary movement already underway in response to Duarte's stolen election. Nevertheless, the oligarchy opposed agrarian reform, and a junta formed with young reformist elements from the army such as Colonels Adolfo Arnoldo Majano and Jaime Abdul Gutiérrez, as well as with progressives such as Guillermo Ungo and Alvarez.

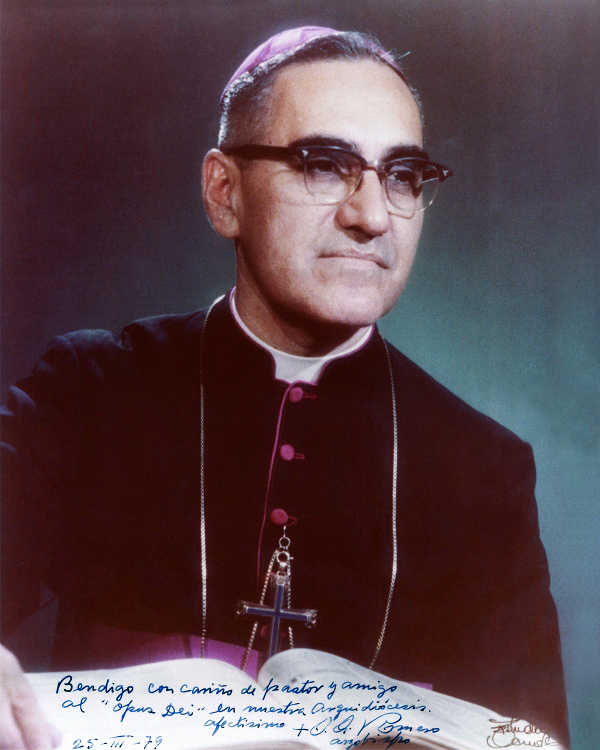
Archbishop Romero spoke out against social injustice and violence amid the escalating conflict between the military government and left-wing insurgents that led to the Salvadoran Civil War.

Pressure from the oligarchy soon dissolved the junta because of its inability to control the army in its repression of the people fighting for unionization rights, agrarian reform, better wages, accessible health care and freedom of expression. In the meantime, the guerrilla movement was spreading to all sectors of Salvadoran society. Middle and high school students were organized in MERS (Movimiento Estudiantil Revolucionario de Secundaria, Revolutionary Movement of Secondary Students); college students were involved with AGEUS (Asociacion de Estudiantes Universitarios Salvadorenos; Association of Salvadoran College Students); and workers were organized in BPR (Bloque Popular Revolucionario, Popular Revolutionary Block). In October 1980, several other major guerrilla groups of the Salvadoran left had formed the Farabundo Martí National Liberation Front, or FMLN. By the end of the 1970s, government-contracted death squads were killing about 10 people each day. Meanwhile, the FMLN had 6,000 to 8,000 active guerrillas and hundreds of thousands of part-time militia, supporters, and sympathizers.

The U.S. supported and financed the creation of a second junta to change the political environment and stop the spread of a leftist insurrection. Napoleón Duarte was recalled from his exile in Venezuela to head this new junta. However, a revolution was already underway and his new role as head of the junta was seen by the general population as opportunistic. He was unable to influence the outcome of the insurrection.

Óscar Romero, the Roman Catholic Archbishop of San Salvador, denounced injustices and massacres committed against civilians by government forces. He was considered "the voice of the voiceless", but he was assassinated by a death squad while saying Mass on 24 March 1980. Some consider this to be the beginning of the full Salvadoran Civil War, which lasted from 1980 to 1992.

An unknown number of people "disappeared" during the conflict, and the UN reports that more than 75,000 were killed. The Salvadoran Army's US-trained Atlácatl Battalion was responsible for the El Mozote massacre where more than 800 civilians were murdered, over half of them children, the El Calabozo massacre, and the murder of UCA scholars.

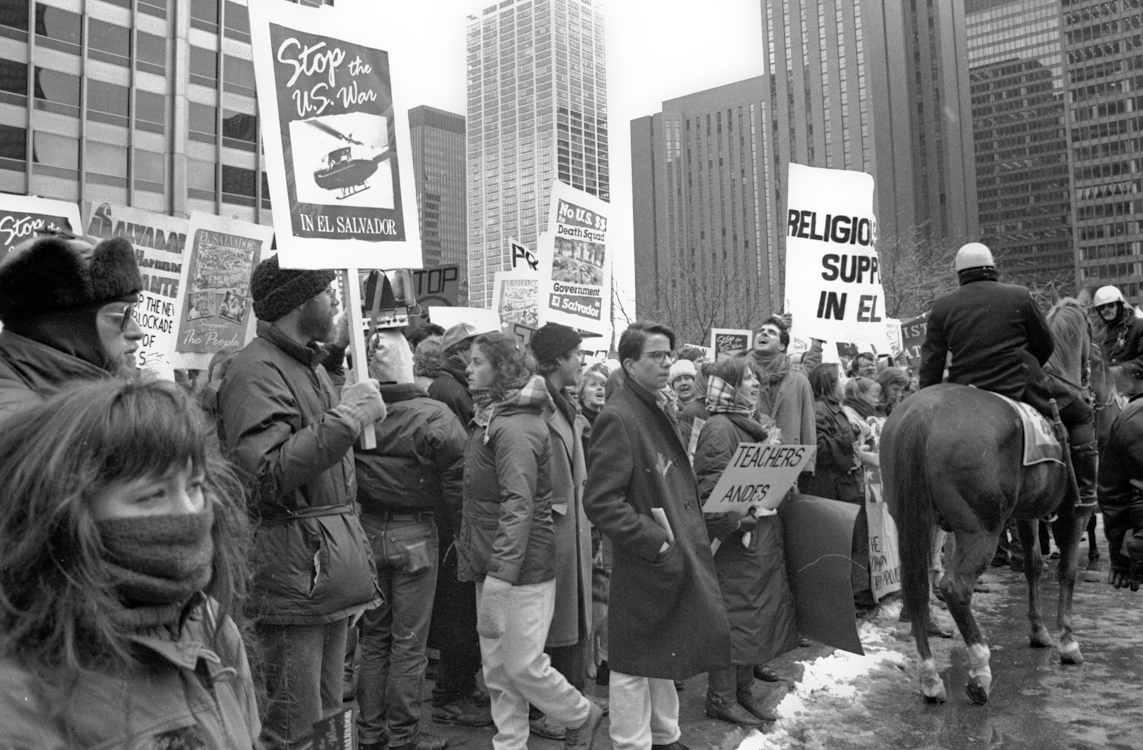
Protest against US involvement in the Salvadoran Civil War in Chicago, Illinois, in March 1989

On 16 January 1992, the government of El Salvador, represented by president Alfredo Cristiani, and the FMLN, represented by the commanders of the five guerrilla groups – Schafik Hándal, Joaquín Villalobos, Salvador Sánchez Cerén, Francisco Jovel and Eduardo Sancho, all signed peace agreements brokered by the United Nations ending the 12-year civil war. This event, held at Chapultepec Castle in Mexico, was attended by U.N. dignitaries and other representatives of the international community. After signing the armistice, the president stood and shook hands with the newly ex-guerrilla commanders, an action which was widely admired.

=== Post-war (1992–2019) ===
The Chapultepec Peace Accords mandated reductions in the size of the army, and the dissolution of the National Police, the Treasury Police, the National Guard and the Civilian Defence, a paramilitary group. A new Civil Police was to be organized. Judicial immunity for crimes committed by the armed forces ended; the government agreed to submit to the recommendations of a Commission on the Truth for El Salvador (Comisión de la Verdad Para El Salvador), which would "investigate serious acts of violence occurring since 1980, and the nature and effects of the violence, and...recommend methods of promoting national reconciliation". In 1993 the Commission delivered its findings reporting human rights violations on both sides of the conflict. Five days later the Salvadoran legislature passed an amnesty law for all acts of violence during the period.

From 1989 until 2004, Salvadorans favoured the Nationalist Republican Alliance (ARENA), voting in ARENA presidents in every election (Alfredo Cristiani, Armando Calderón Sol, Francisco Flores Pérez, Antonio Saca) until 2009. The unsuccessful attempts of the left-wing party to win presidential elections led to its selection of a journalist rather than a former guerrilla leader as a candidate. On 15 March 2009, Mauricio Funes, a television figure, became the first president from the FMLN. He was inaugurated on 1 June 2009. One focus of the Funes government has been revealing the alleged corruption from the past government.

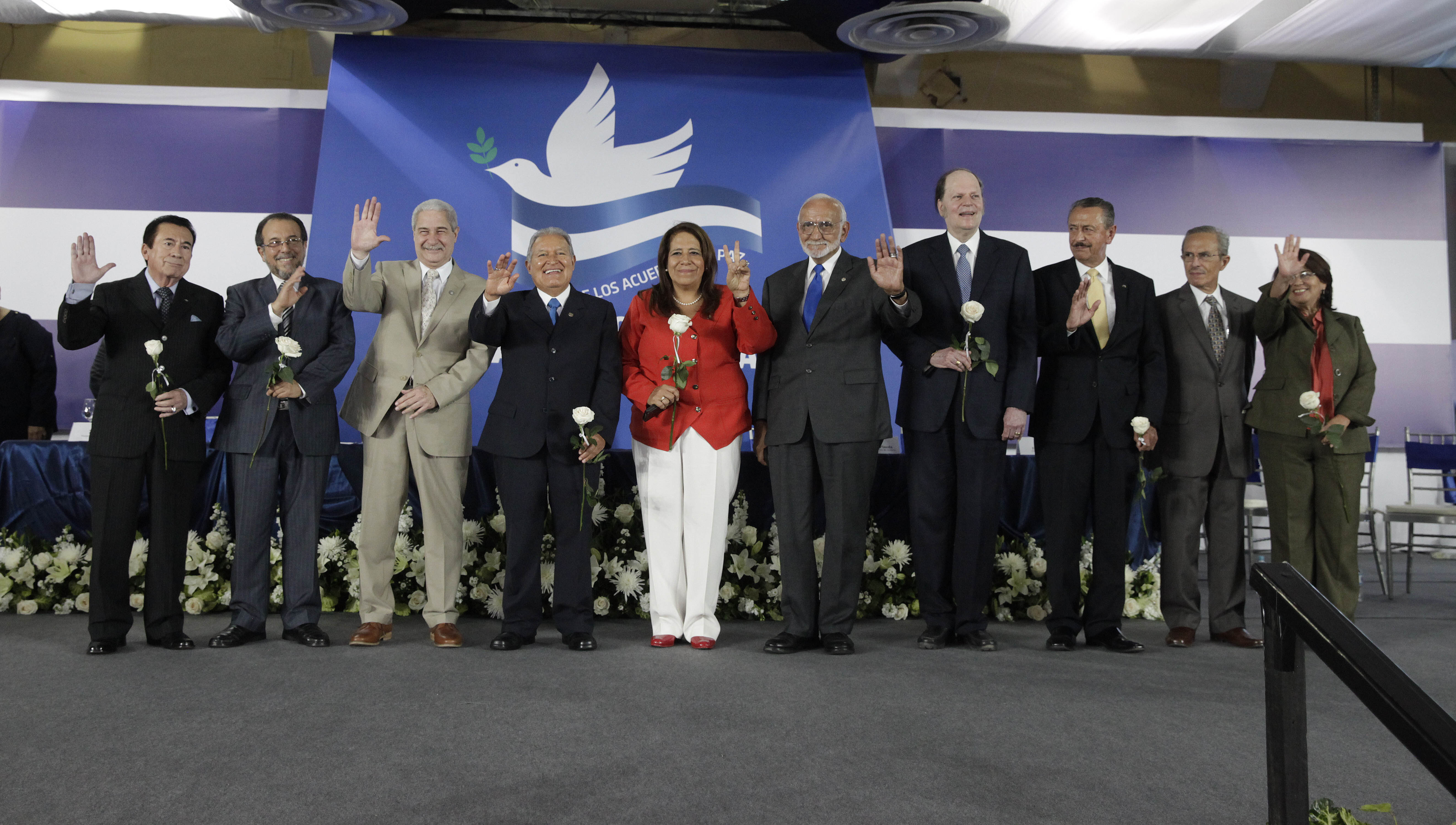
The signatories of the Peace Agreements. on its XXIV anniversary; The agreements led to a series of transformations that marked a before and after in national history.

ARENA formally expelled Saca from the party in December 2009. With 12 loyalists in the National Assembly, Saca established his own party, the Grand Alliance for National Unity (GANA), and entered into a tactical legislative alliance with the FMLN. After three years in office, with Saca's GANA party providing the FMLN with a legislative majority, Funes had not taken action to either investigate or to bring corrupt former officials to justice.

Economic reforms since the early 1990s brought major benefits in terms of improved social conditions, diversification of the export sector, and access to international financial markets at investment grade level. Crime remains a major problem for the investment climate. Early in the new millennium, El Salvador's government created the Ministerio de Medio Ambiente y Recursos Naturales — the Ministry of Environment and Natural Resources (MARN) — in response to climate change concerns.

In March 2014, former FMLN guerrilla leader Cerén narrowly won the election. He was sworn in as president on 31 May 2014. He was the first former guerrilla to become the president of El Salvador.

In October 2017, an El Salvador court ruled that former president Funes and one of his sons had illegally enriched themselves. Funes had sought asylum in Nicaragua in 2016.

In September 2018, former president Saca was sentenced to 10 years in prison after he pleaded guilty to diverting more than US$300 million in state funds to his own businesses and third parties.

=== Bukele era (2019–present) ===
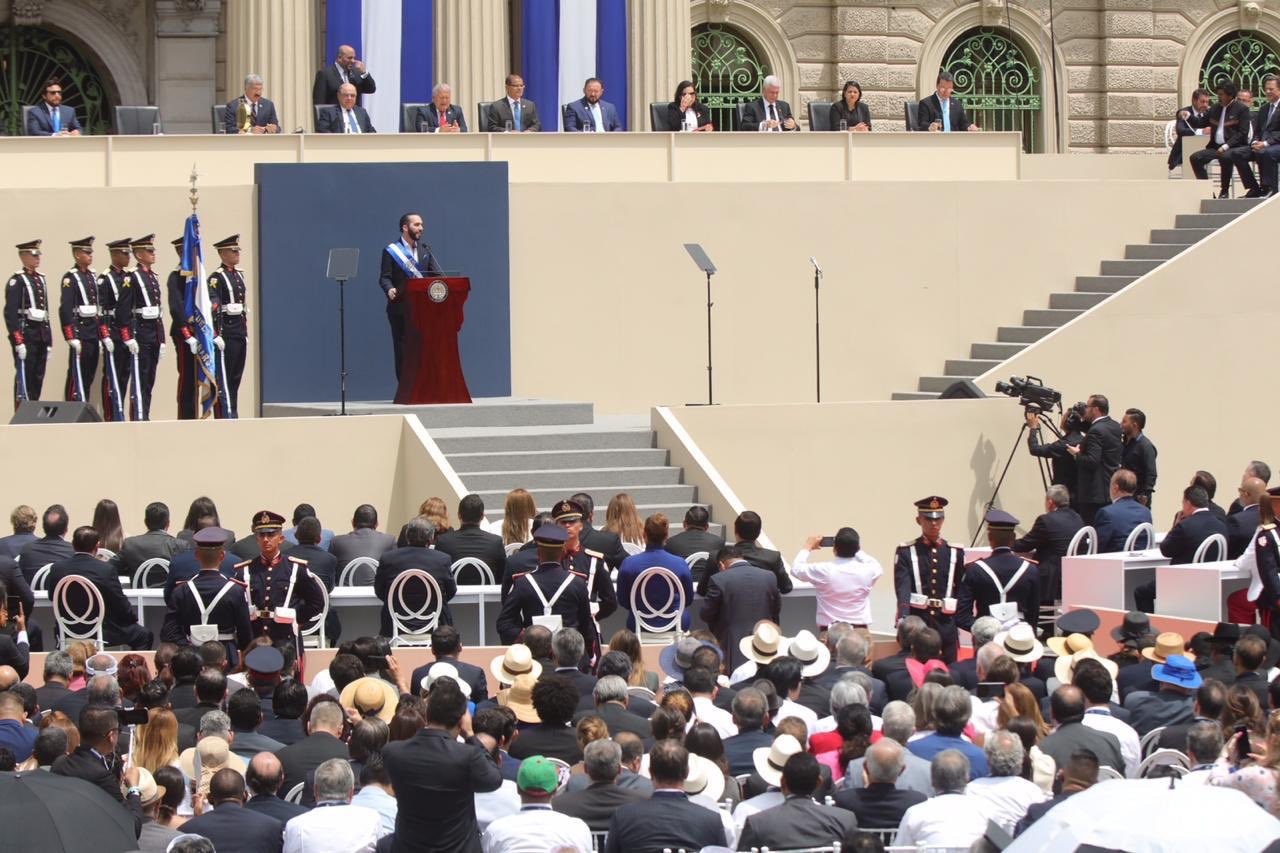
Nayib Bukele speaks at his inauguration ceremony.

On 1 June 2019, Nayib Bukele became the new president of El Salvador. Bukele was the winner of February 2019 presidential election. He represented GANA, as he was denied participating with the newly formed Nuevas Ideas party. ARENA and the FMLN, El Salvador's two main parties, had dominated politics in El Salvador over the past three decades.

According to a report by the International Crisis Group (ICG) 2020, the homicide rate in El Salvador had dropped by as much as 60% since Bukele became president in June 2019. Although the government officially denied any collusion with organised crime, press reports based on testimony from government members and security officials stated a "non-aggression deal" between parts of the government and the gangs existed.

The party Nuevas Ideas (NI, "New Ideas"), founded by Bukele, with its ally (GANA) won around 63% of the vote in the February 2021 legislative elections. His party and allies won 61 seats, well over the coveted supermajority of 56 seats in the 84-seat parliament, allowing for uncontested decisions at the legislative level. The supermajority permits President Bukele's party to appoint judiciary members and pass laws with little to no opposition, for instance, to remove presidential term limits.

On 8 June 2021, at the initiative of President Bukele, pro-government deputies in the Legislative Assembly passed legislation to make bitcoin legal tender in El Salvador. In September 2021, El Salvador's Supreme Court ruled to allow Bukele to run for a second term in 2024, despite the fact that the constitution prohibits the president to serve two consecutive terms in office. The decision was organized by judges appointed to the court by Bukele. On 25 February 2021, El Salvador became the first Central American country to be awarded certification for the elimination of malaria by the WHO.

In January 2022, the International Monetary Fund (IMF) urged El Salvador to reverse its decision to make cryptocurrency legal tender. Bitcoin had rapidly lost about half of its value, meaning economic difficulties and, as of May 2022, with government bonds trading at 40% of their original value, the prospect of a looming sovereign default; however, as of April 2025, bitcoin's value has doubled since El Salvador first designated it as legal tender. Bukele announced back in January 2022 plans to build Bitcoin City at the base of a volcano in El Salvador.

In 2022, the Salvadoran government initiated a massive fight against criminal gangs and gang-related violence. A state of emergency was declared on 27 March and was extended on 20 July. More than 53,000 suspected gang members were arrested, precipitating the highest reported incarceration rate in the world. The crackdown has reportedly produced hundreds of deaths of detainees, with international human rights organizations such as Amnesty International declaring it the worst abuse of human rights in the country since its civil war.

On 30 November 2023, the Legislative Assembly granted Bukele and Vice President Felix Ulloa a leave of absence so that they could focus on their 2024 re-election campaign. Bukele was succeeded by Claudia Rodríguez de Guevara as acting president, the first female president in Salvadoran history.

In January 2024, it was announced that homicide rate dropped nearly 70% year over year, with 154 in 2023 compared to 495 homicides in 2022. On 4 February 2024, Bukele won re-election with 84% of the vote in the presidential election. His party Nuevas Ideas won 58 of the parliament's 60 seats. On 1 June 2024, he was sworn in for his second five-year term. In February 2025, El Salvador’s Congress agreed to remove Bitcoin's legal tender status, following pressure from the International Monetary Fund. In late-July 2025, the Legislative Assembly approved of changes to the Constitution of El Salvador, which would remove presidential term-limits, and extend individual terms from 5 years to 6. The Legislative Assembly also moved the next presidential election from 2029 to 2027 (making it coterminous with the legislative elections that year), after which the constitutional changes would take effect.

== Geography ==
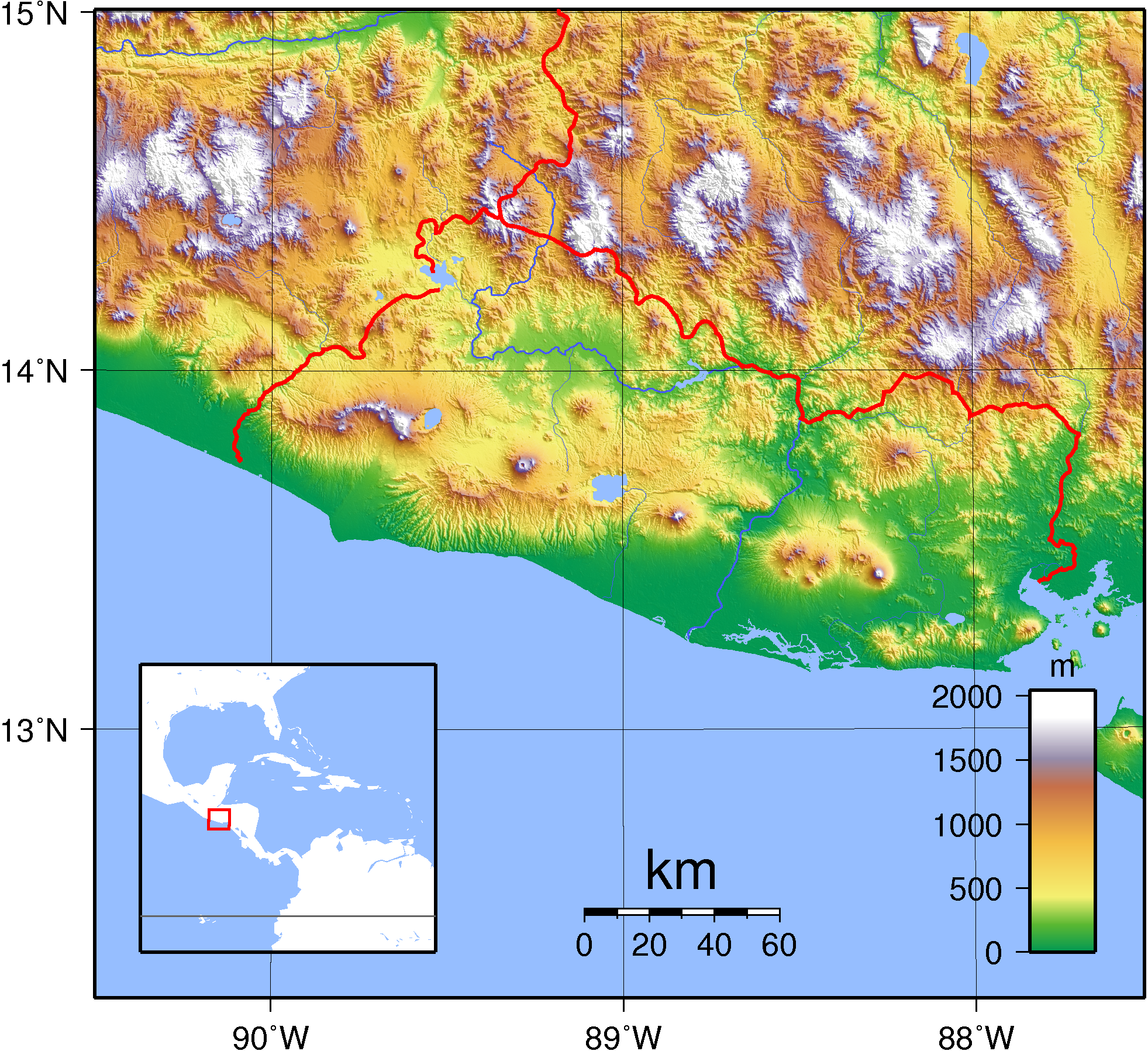
El Salvador's topography

El Salvador lies in the isthmus of Central America between latitudes 13° and 15°N, and longitudes 87° and 91°W. It stretches 270 km (168 mi) from west-northwest to east-southeast and 142 km (88 mi) north to south, with a total area of 21,041 km^{2} (8,124 sq mi). As the smallest and most densely populated country in continental America, El Salvador is affectionately called Pulgarcito de America (the "Tom Thumb of the Americas"). El Salvador shares borders with Guatemala and Honduras, as well as a coastline with the Pacific Ocean. The total national boundary length is 546 km (339 mi): 203 km (126 mi) with Guatemala and 343 km (213 mi) with Honduras. It is the only Central American country that has no Caribbean coastline. The coastline on the Pacific is 307 km (191 mi) long.

El Salvador has over 300 rivers, the most important of which is the Rio Lempa. Originating in Guatemala, the Rio Lempa cuts across the northern range of mountains, flows along much of the central plateau, and cuts through the southern volcanic range to empty into the Pacific. It is El Salvador's only navigable river. It and its tributaries drain about half of the country's area. Other rivers are generally short and drain the Pacific lowlands or flow from the central plateau through gaps in the southern mountain range to the Pacific. These include the Goascorán, Jiboa, Torola, Paz and the Río Grande de San Miguel.

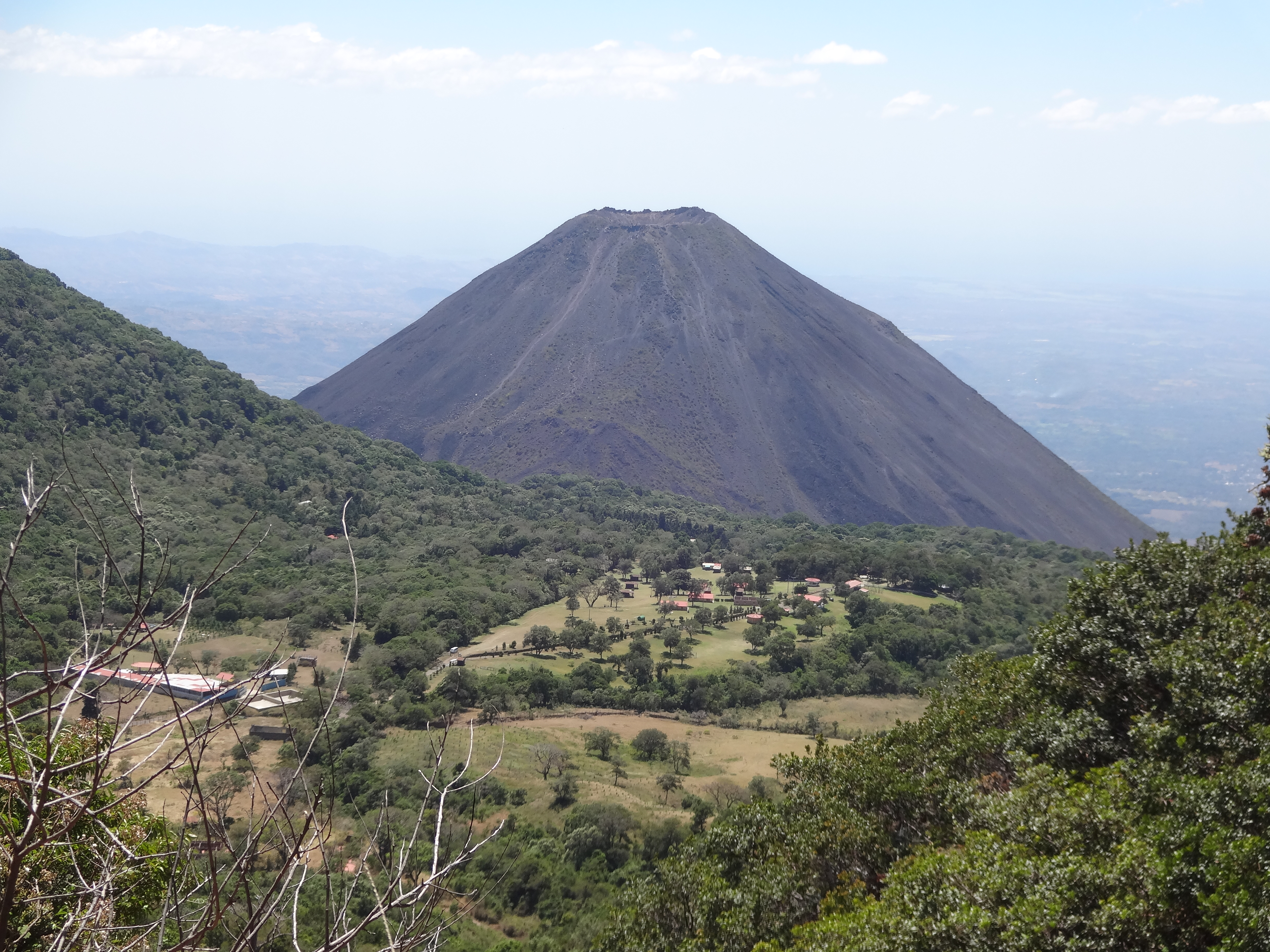
Ilamatepec (Santa Ana) Volcano

The geography of El Salvador is volcanic. El Salvador is a country located on the Ring of Fire, where the majority of the earth's volcanos and earthquakes occur. The most notable volcano is Volcan Chaparrastique (San Miguel Volcano), which also exhibits the most volcanic activity. The tallest volcano is Ilamatepec (Santa Ana Volcano), reaching 7,821 feet (2,384 meters) above sea level. Along with these, there are 20 other volcanoes, many which are active, or potentially active. El Salvador has the second highest number of volcanoes of any Central American country.

There are several lakes enclosed by volcanic craters in El Salvador, the most important of which are Lake Ilopango (70 km^{2} or 27 sq mi) and Lake Coatepeque (26 km^{2} or 10 sq mi). Lake Güija is El Salvador's largest natural lake (44 km^{2} or 17 sq mi). Several artificial lakes were created by the damming of the Lempa, the largest of which is Cerrón Grande Reservoir (135 km^{2} or 52 sq mi). There are a total 320 km^{2} (123.6 sq mi) of water within El Salvador's borders.

The highest point in El Salvador is Cerro El Pital, at 2,730 metres (8,957 ft), on the border with Honduras. Two parallel mountain ranges cross El Salvador to the west with a central plateau between them and a narrow coastal plain hugging the Pacific. These physical features divide the country into two physiographic regions. The mountain ranges and central plateau, covering 85% of the land, comprise the interior highlands. The remaining coastal plains are referred to as the Pacific lowlands.

=== Climate ===
The Köppen climate classification of El Salvador's territory

El Salvador has a tropical climate with pronounced wet and dry seasons. Temperatures vary primarily with elevation and show little seasonal change. The Pacific lowlands are uniformly hot and humid. The central plateau and mountain areas are more moderate.

The rainy season, known locally as invierno, extends from May to October. Almost all the annual rain falls during this time, and yearly rain totals, particularly on southern-facing mountain slopes, can be as high as 2,000 millimeters (78.7 in). Protected areas and the central plateau receive lesser, although still significant, amounts. Rainfall during this season generally comes from low pressure over the Pacific and usually falls in heavy afternoon thunderstorms. Although hurricanes occasionally form in the Pacific, they seldom affect El Salvador, with the notable exception of Hurricane Mitch in 1998 (which actually formed over the Atlantic Basin) and Hurricane Emily in 1973.

From November to April, the northeast trade winds control weather patterns. During these months, air flowing from the Caribbean has lost most of its precipitation while passing over the mountains in Honduras. By the time this air reaches El Salvador, it is dry, hot, and hazy. This season is known locally as verano, or summer.

Temperatures vary little with season; elevation is the primary determinant. The Pacific lowlands are the hottest region, with annual averages ranging from 25 to 29 °C (77.0 to 84.2 °F). San Salvador is representative of the central plateau, with an annual average temperature of 23 °C (73 °F) and absolute high and low readings of 38 and 6 °C (100.4 and 42.8 °F), respectively. Mountain areas are the coolest, with annual averages from 12 to 23 °C (53.6 to 73.4 °F) and minimum temperatures sometimes approaching freezing.

=== Natural disasters ===
==== Extreme weather events ====
El Salvador's position on the Pacific Ocean makes it subject to severe weather conditions, including heavy rainstorms and severe droughts, both of which may be made more extreme by the El Niño and La Niña effects. Hurricanes occasionally form in the Pacific, with the notable exception of Hurricane Mitch, which formed in the Atlantic and crossed Central America.

In the summer of 2001 a severe drought destroyed 80% of El Salvador's crops, causing famine in the countryside. On 4 October 2005, severe rains resulted in dangerous flooding and landslides, which caused at least 50 deaths.

==== Earthquakes and volcanic activity ====
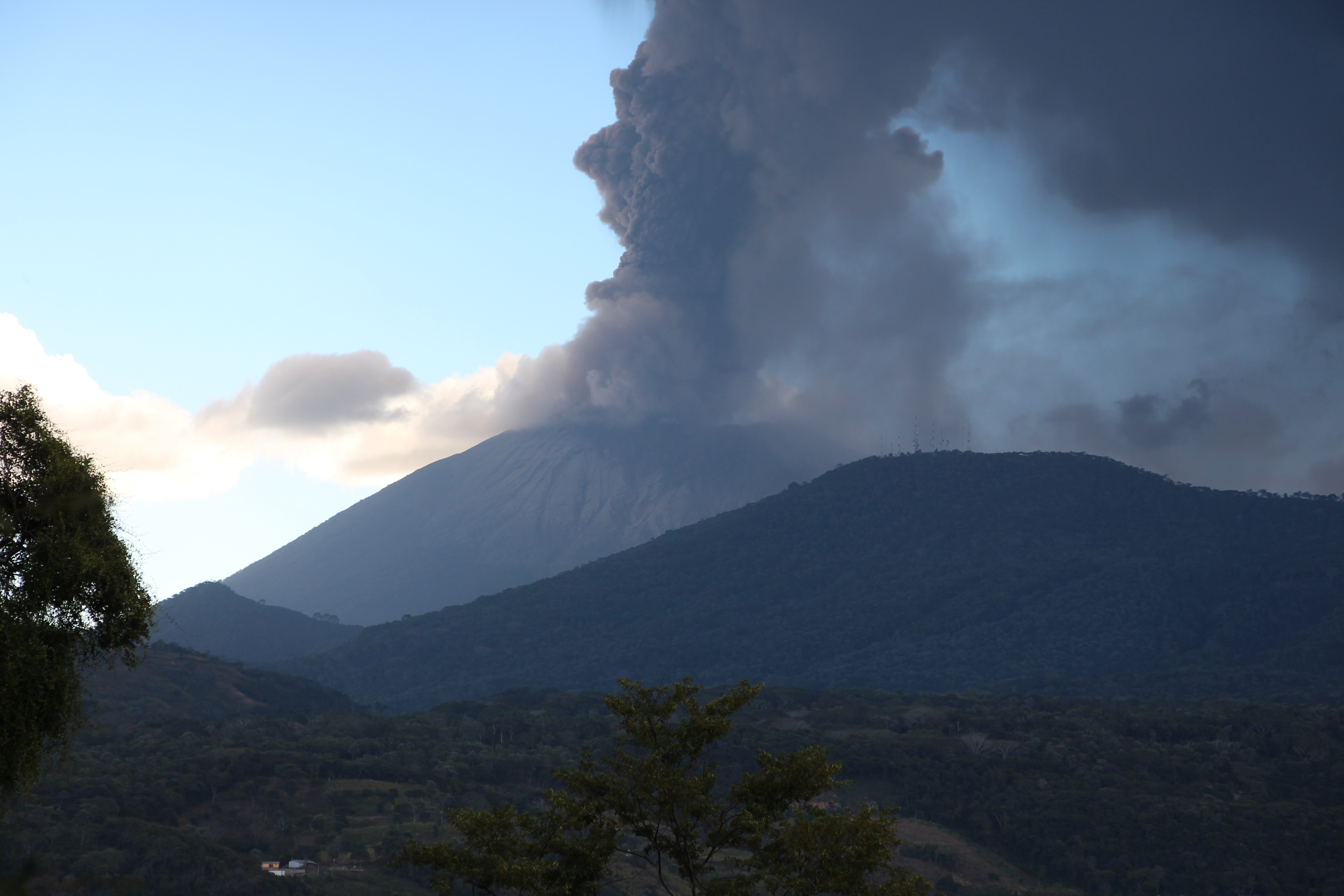
San Miguel volcano in 2013

El Salvador lies along the Pacific Ring of Fire and is subject to significant tectonic activity, including frequent earthquakes and volcanic activity. The capital San Salvador was destroyed in 1756 and 1854, and it suffered heavy damage in the 1919, 1982, and 1986 tremors. Recent examples include the magnitude 7.7 earthquake on 13 January 2001 that caused a landslide that killed more than 800 people. Another earthquake a month later, on 13 February 2001, killed 255 people and damaged about 20% of the country's housing. A 5.7 M_{w} earthquake in 1986 resulted in 1,500 deaths, 10,000 injuries, and 100,000 people left homeless.

El Salvador has over twenty volcanoes. Two of them, San Miguel and Izalco, have been active in recent years. From the early 19th century to the mid-1950s, Izalco erupted with a regularity that earned it the name "Lighthouse of the Pacific". Its brilliant flares were clearly visible for great distances at sea, and at night its glowing lava turned it into a brilliant luminous cone. The most recent destructive volcanic eruption took place on 1 October 2005, when the Santa Ana Volcano spewed a cloud of ash, hot mud and rocks that fell on nearby villages and caused two deaths. The most severe volcanic eruption in this area occurred in the 5th century AD, when the Ilopango volcano erupted with a VEI strength of 6, producing widespread pyroclastic flows and devastating Mayan cities.

=== Flora and fauna ===
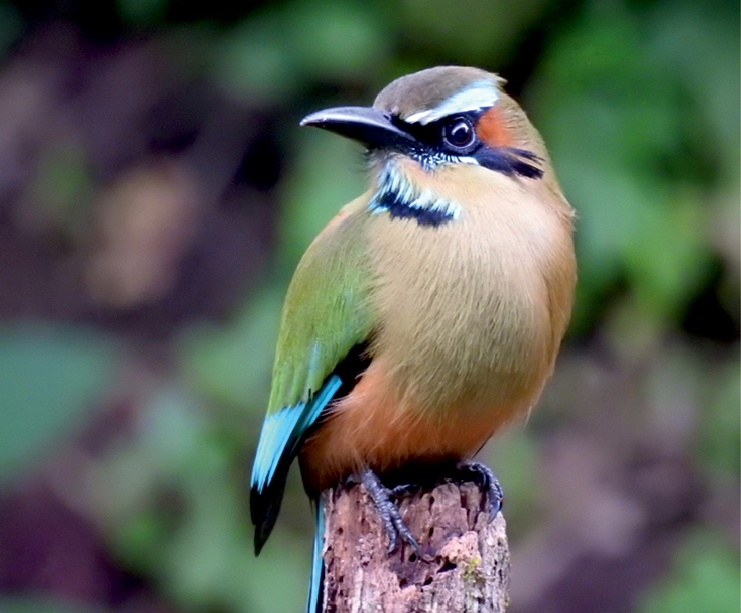
The torogoz is El Salvador's national bird.

It is estimated that there are 500 species of birds, 1,000 species of butterflies, 400 species of orchids, 800 species of trees, and 800 species of marine saltwater fish in El Salvador.

Of the eight species of sea turtles in the world, six of them nest on the coasts of Central America, and four make their home on the Salvadoran coast: the leatherback turtle, the hawksbill, the green sea turtle, and the olive ridley. The hawksbill is critically endangered.

Recent conservation efforts provide hope for the future of the country's biological diversity. In 1997, the government established the Ministry of the Environment and Natural Resources. In 1999, a general environmental framework law was approved by the National Assembly. Several non-governmental organizations are doing work to safeguard some of El Salvador's most important forested areas. Foremost among these is SalvaNatura, which manages El Imposible, El Salvador's largest national park under an agreement with El Salvador's environmental authorities.

El Salvador is home to six terrestrial ecosystems: Central American montane forests, Sierra Madre de Chiapas moist forests, Central American dry forests, Central American pine-oak forests, Gulf of Fonseca mangroves, and Northern Dry Pacific Coast mangroves. It had a 2018 Forest Landscape Integrity Index mean score of 4.06/10, ranking it 136th globally out of 172 countries.

== Government and politics ==
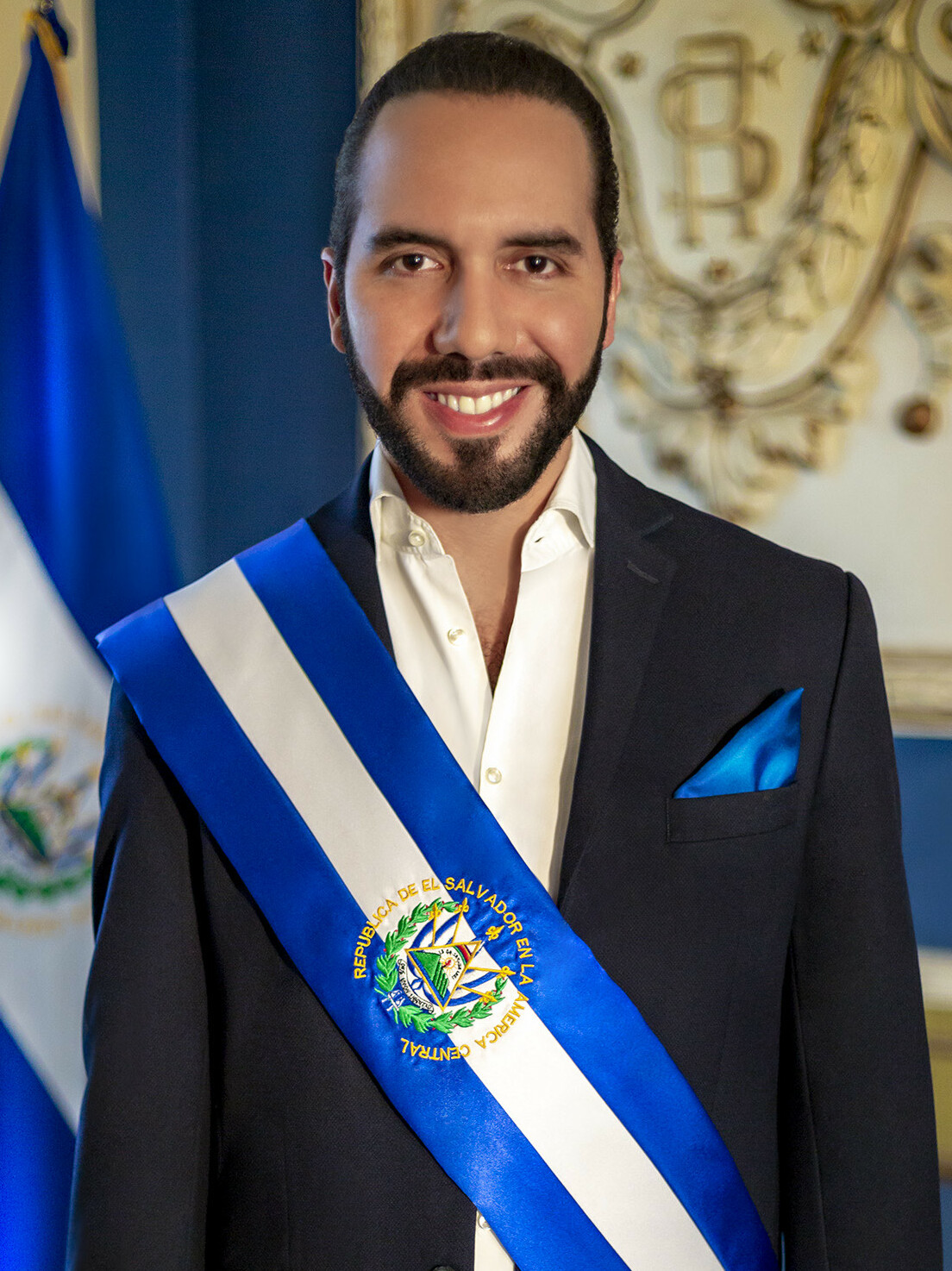
Nayib Bukele
President of El Salvador
since 2019

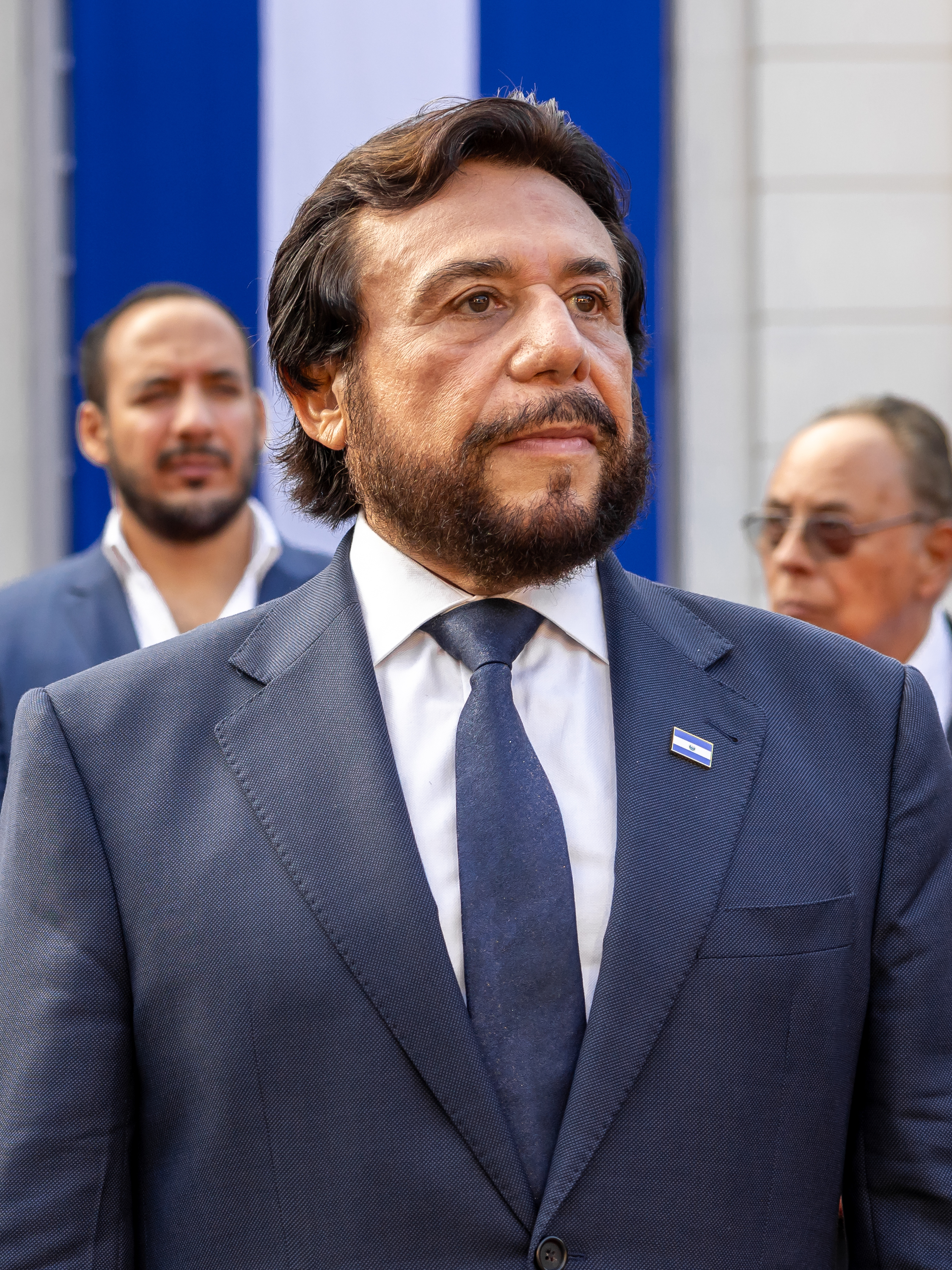
Félix Ulloa
Vice President of El Salvador
since 2019

The 1983 constitution has the highest legal authority in the country. El Salvador has a democratic and representative government, whose three bodies are:

1. The Executive Branch, headed by the President of the Republic, who is elected by direct vote and remains in office for five years with no re-election but can be elected after sitting out one electoral period. The president has a Cabinet of Ministers whom he appoints, and is also the Commander-in-Chief of the Armed Forces.
2. The Legislative Branch, called El Salvador's Legislative Assembly (unicameral), consisting of 60 deputies.
3. The Judiciary, headed by the Supreme Court, which is composed of 15 judges, one of them being elected as President of the Judiciary.

The political framework of El Salvador is a presidential representative democratic republic with a multiform, multi-party system. The president, currently Nayib Bukele, is both head of state and head of government. Executive power is exercised by the government. Legislative power is vested in both the government and the Legislative Assembly. The country also has an independent judiciary and Supreme Court. It was ranked the 5th least electoral democratic country in Latin America and the Caribbean in 2023 by V-Dem Democracy Report.

=== Politics ===
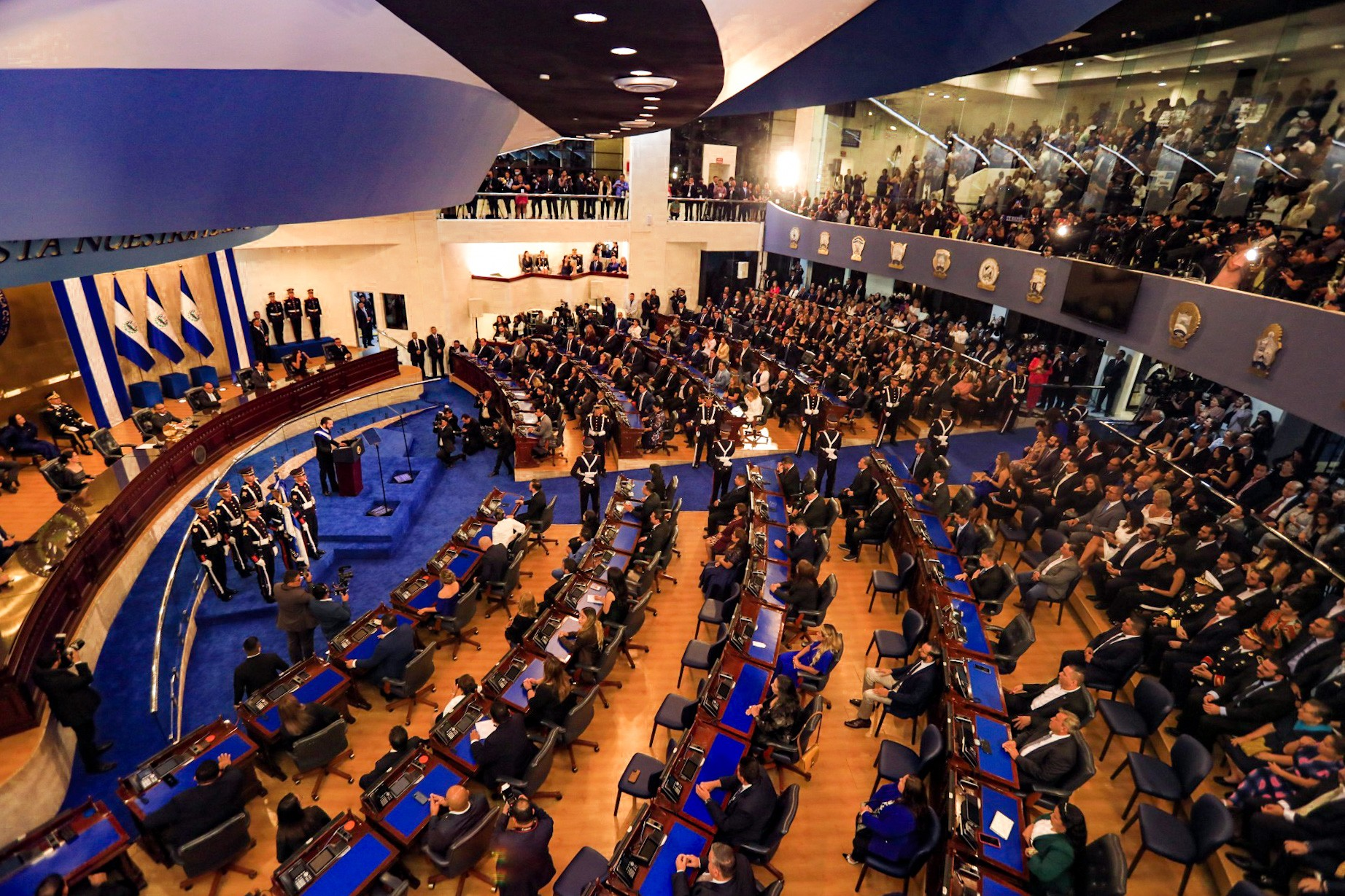
The Legislative Assembly of El Salvador

El Salvador has a multi-party system. Two political parties, the Nationalist Republican Alliance (ARENA) and the Farabundo Martí National Liberation Front (FMLN) have tended to dominate elections. ARENA candidates won four consecutive presidential elections until the election of Mauricio Funes of the FMLN in March 2009. The FMLN Party is leftist in ideology, and is split between the dominant Marxist-Leninist faction in the legislature, and the social liberal wing led by Mauricio Funes until 2014.

The two-party dominance was broken after Nayib Bukele, a candidate from GANA won the 2019 Salvadoran presidential election. In February 2021, the results of legislative election caused a major change in the politics of El Salvador. The new allied party of president Nayib Bukele, Nuevas Ideas (New Ideas) won the biggest congressional majority in the country's history.

The departments of the Central region, especially the capital and the coastal regions, known as departamentos rojos (red departments) are relatively leftist. The departamentos azules (blue departments) in the east, western and highland regions are relatively conservative.

=== Administrative divisions ===
El Salvador is divided into 14 departments (departamentos), which in turn are subdivided into 44 municipalities (municipios) which are also divided into 262 districts.

=== Foreign relations ===
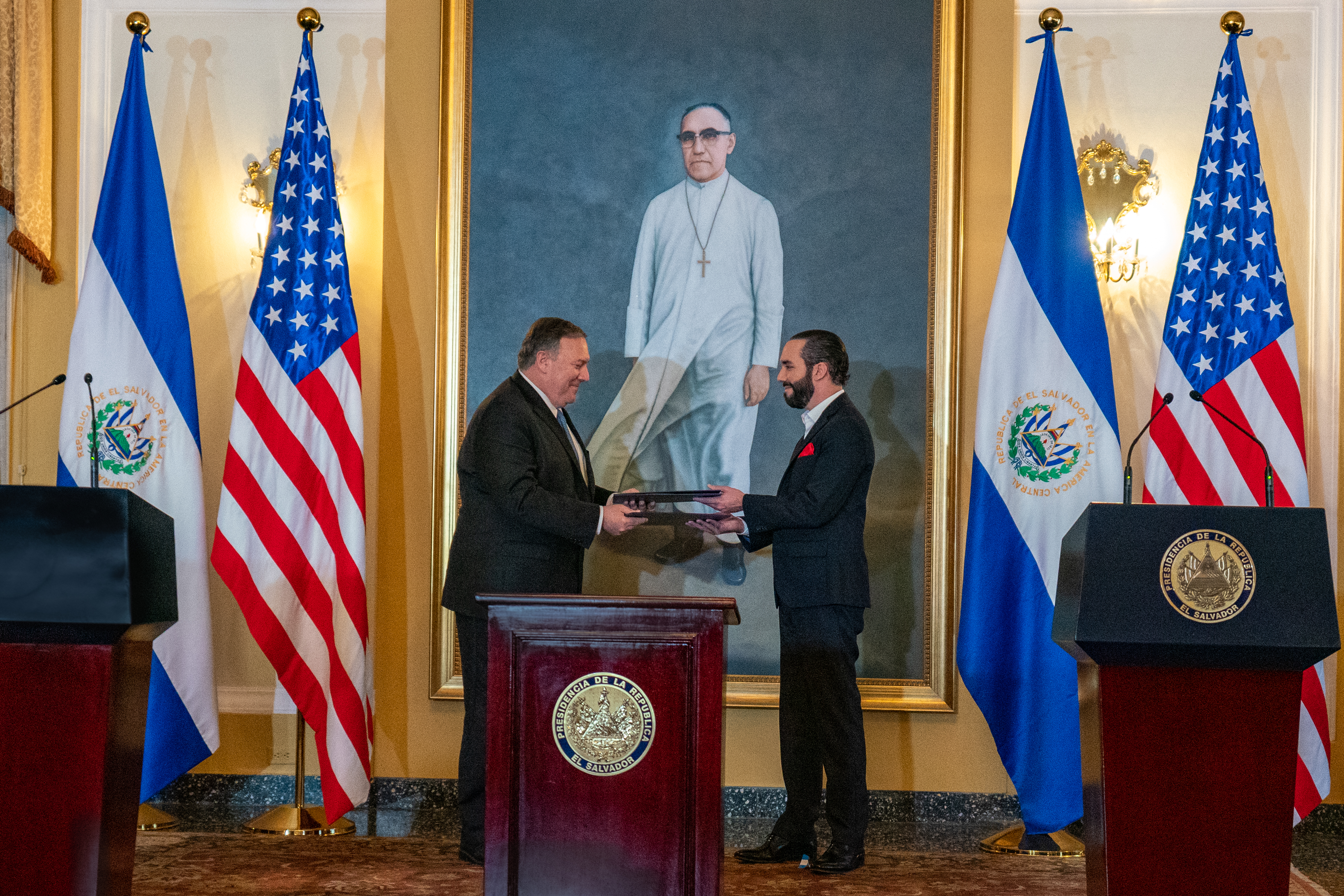
U.S. Secretary of State Mike Pompeo participates in a signing ceremony for the CSL Lease Extension with Salvadoran President Nayib Bukele.

El Salvador is a member of the United Nations and several of its specialized agencies. It is also member of the Organization of American States, the Central American Parliament, and the Central American Integration System among others. It actively participates in the Central American Security Commission, which seeks to promote regional arms control. El Salvador is a member of the World Trade Organization and is pursuing regional free trade agreements. An active participant in the Summit of the Americas process, El Salvador chairs a working group on market access under the Free Trade Area of the Americas initiative.

In November 1950, El Salvador was the only country to help the newly empowered 14th Dalai Lama by supporting his Tibetan Government cabinet minister's telegram requesting an appeal before the General Assembly of the United Nations to stop the annexation of Tibet by the People's Republic of China. With no other countries in support, "the UN unanimously dropped the Tibetan plea from its agenda".

El Salvador is a party to the Rome Statute of the International Criminal Court.

=== Military ===
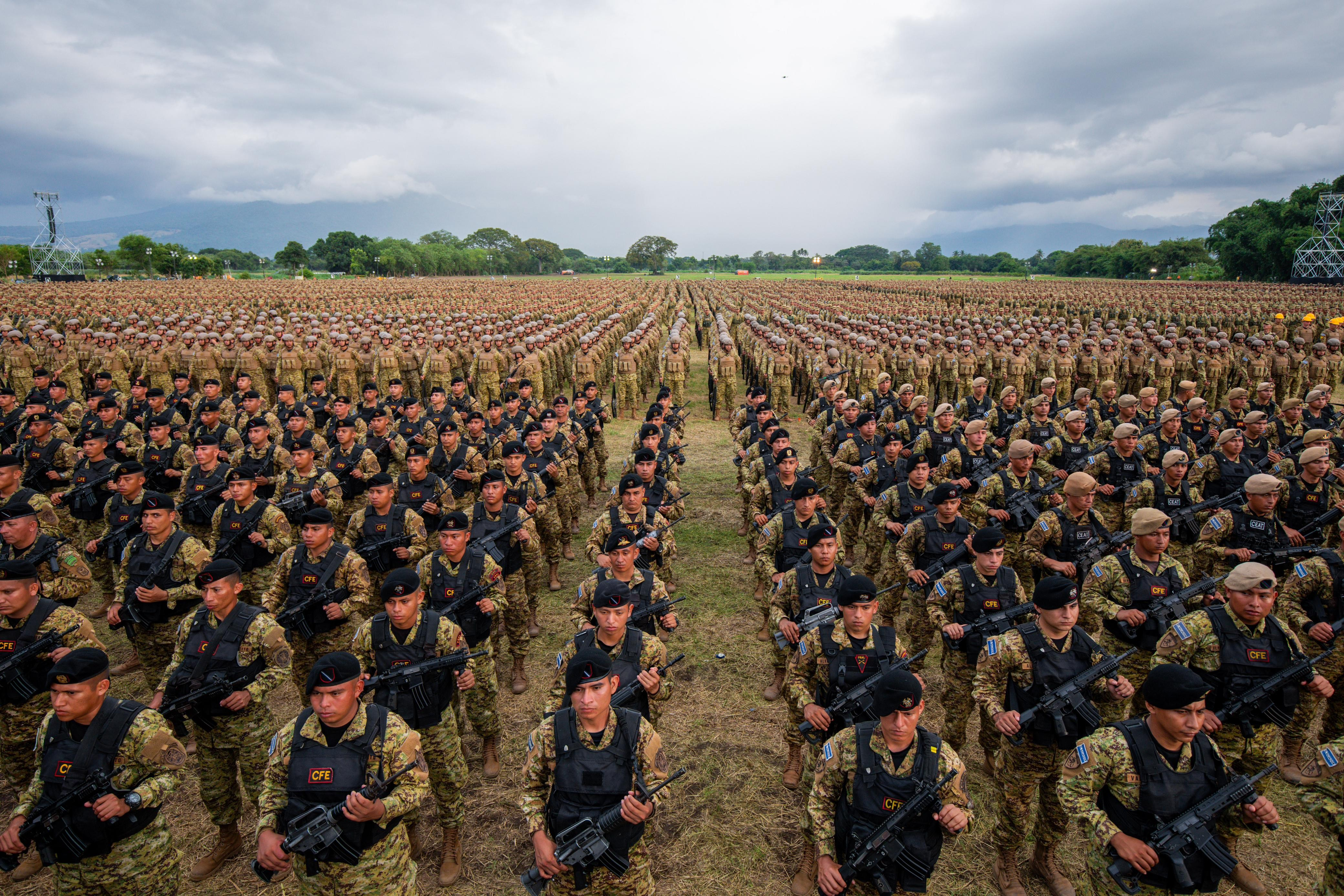
Soldiers in 2024

The Armed Forces of El Salvador have three branches: the Salvadoran Army, the Salvadoran Air Force and the Navy of El Salvador. There are around 40,000 personnel in the armed forces in total.

=== Incarceration ===
As of February 2025, El Salvador had the highest prisoner rate worldwide, with over 1,600 prisoners per 100,000 of the national population.

El Salvador’s Terrorism Confinement Center (CECOT) mega-prison is considered the largest prison in the Americas with a capacity of 40,000 inmates. The incarcerations have been part of president Bukele’s efforts to reduce high crime rates and gang violence. In March 2025, the United States transferred more than 200 immigrants, alleging them to be members of a Venezuelan gang, to be imprisoned in El Salvador in violation of court orders.

=== Human rights ===
Amnesty International has drawn attention to several arrests of police officers for unlawful police killings. Other issues to gain Amnesty International's attention include missing children, failure of law enforcement to properly investigate and prosecute crimes against women, and rendering organized labour illegal.

Abortion is banned, with no exceptions for rape, incest, or threat to the mother's life; as a result, 180 women have been imprisoned in the last two decades, some for up to 30 years. Discrimination against LGBT people in El Salvador is very widespread. In a 2013 survey by Pew Research, 53% of Salvadorans believe that homosexuality should not be accepted by society. Although homosexuality itself is legal, gay marriage is legally not recognized, as proposals were rejected twice in 2006, and once again in 2009.

== Economy ==
GDP per capita in El Salvador, Guatemala and Honduras, 1920 to 2018

El Salvador's economy has been hampered at times by natural disasters such as earthquakes and hurricanes, by government policies that mandate large economic subsidies, and by official corruption. Subsidies became such a problem that in April 2012, the International Monetary Fund suspended a $750 million loan to the central government. President Funes' chief of cabinet, Alex Segovia, acknowledged that the economy was at the "point of collapse".

Gross domestic product (GDP) in purchasing power parity estimate for 2021 is US$57.95 billion growing real GDP at 4.2% for 2021. The service sector is the largest component of GDP at 64.1%, followed by the industrial sector at 24.7% (2008 est.) and agriculture represents 11.2% of GDP (2010 est.). The GDP grew after 1996 at an annual rate that averaged 3.2% real growth. The government committed to free market initiatives and the 2007 GDP's real growth rate hit 4.7%. As of December 2017, net international reserves stood at $3.57 billion.

It has long been a challenge in El Salvador to develop new growth sectors for a more diversified economy. In the past, the country produced gold and silver, but recent attempts to reopen the mining sector, which were expected to add hundreds of millions of dollars to the local economy, collapsed after President Saca shut down the operations of Pacific Rim Mining Corporation. Nevertheless, according to the Central American Institute for Fiscal Studies (Instituto Centroamericano for Estudios Fiscales), the contribution of metallic mining was a minuscule 0.3% of the country's GDP between 2010 and 2015. Saca's decision although not lacking political motives, had strong support from local residents and grassroots movements in the country. President Funes later rejected a company's application for a further permit based on the risk of cyanide contamination on one of the country's main rivers.

As with other former colonies, El Salvador was considered a mono-export economy (an economy that depended heavily on one type of export) for many years. During colonial times, El Salvador was a thriving exporter of indigo, but after the invention of synthetic dyes in the 19th century, the newly created modern state turned to coffee as the main export.

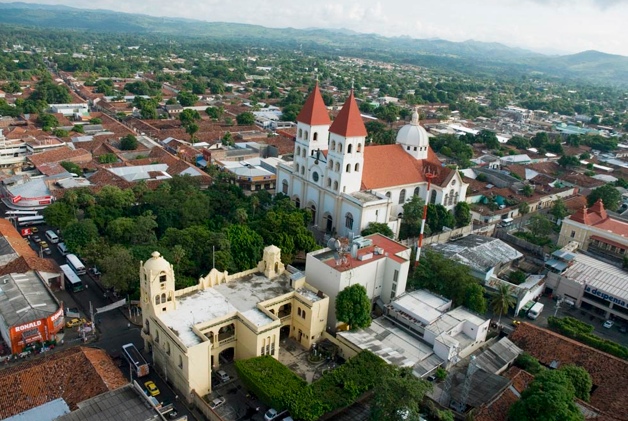
San Miguel is an important economic centre of El Salvador and home to the "Carnival of San Miguel", one of the biggest festivals of entertainment and food in Central America.

The government has sought to improve the collection of its current revenues, with a focus on indirect taxes. A 10% value-added tax (IVA in Spanish), implemented in September 1992, was raised to 13% in July 1995. Inflation has been steady and among the lowest in the region. As a result of the free trade agreements, from 2000 to 2006, total exports have grown 19% from $2.94 billion to $3.51 billion, and total imports have risen 54% from $4.95 billion to $7.63 billion. This has resulted in a 102% increase in the trade deficit, from $2.01 billion to $4.12 billion.

In 2006, El Salvador was the first country to ratify the Central America-Dominican Republic Free Trade Agreement (CAFTA) — negotiated by the five countries of Central America and the Dominican Republic — with the United States. CAFTA requires that the Salvadoran government adopt policies that foster free trade. CAFTA has bolstered exports of processed foods, sugar, and ethanol, and supported investment in the apparel sector, which faced Asian competition with the expiration of the Multi Fibre Arrangement in 2005. In anticipation of the declines in the apparel sector's competitiveness, the previous administration sought to diversify the economy by promoting the country as a regional distribution and logistics hub, and by promoting tourism investment through tax incentives.

In June 2021, President Nayib Bukele said he would introduce legislation to make Bitcoin legal tender in El Salvador. The Bitcoin Law was passed by the Legislative Assembly of El Salvador on 9 June 2021. Bitcoin officially became a legal tender on 7 September 2021. As part of the law, foreigners can gain permanent residence in El Salvador if they invest 3 Bitcoin into the country. The implementation of the law has been met with protests, with the majority of the country being against using Bitcoin as legal tender.

According to a survey conducted by the Salvadoran Chamber of Commerce, as of March 2022 only 14% of merchants in the country processed at least one Bitcoin transaction. Since May 2024, an official government entity named the Bitcoin Office of El Salvador reports that the government holds 5,750 bitcoin (approximately $354 million circa May 2024) -- with nearly 474 bitcoin (approx $29 million circa May 2024) mined since September 2021 using geothermal energy from the Tecapa volcano.

El Salvador leads the region in remittances per capita, with inflows equivalent to nearly all export income; in 2019 2.35 million Salvadorans lived in the U.S. and about a third of all households received remittances. Remittances from Salvadorans living in the United States, sent to family members in El Salvador, are a major source of foreign income and offset the trade deficit. Remittances have increased steadily since the early 2000s, growing from $3.32 billion, or approximately 16.2% of GDP in 2006, to nearly $6 billion (around 20% of GDP in 2019, one of the highest rates in the world, according to the World Bank.)

=== Energy ===
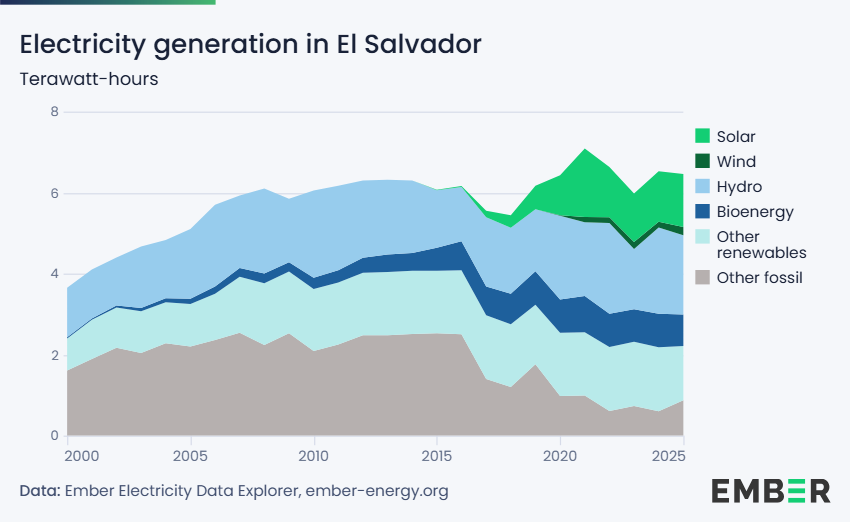
Electricity generation in El Salvador in terawatt-hours

El Salvador's energy industry is diversified, relying on fossil fuels, hydro, other renewables (mainly geothermal) for local electricity production, along with a reliance on imports for oil. El Salvador has an installed capacity of 1,983 MW generating 5,830 GWh of electricity per year, 84% of this comes from renewable sources including 26.85% from geothermal (produced from the country's many volcanoes), 29.92% from hydro and the rest is from fossil fuels.

According to the National Energy Commission, 94.4% of total injections during January 2021 came from hydroelectric plants (28.5% - 124.43 GWh), geothermal (27.3% - 119.07 GWh), biomass (24.4% 106.43 GWh), photovoltaic solar (10.6% - 46.44 GWh) and wind (3.6% - 15.67 GWh).

=== Telecommunications and media ===
El Salvador has 900,000 fixed telephone lines, 500,000 fixed broadband lines and 9.4 million mobile cellular subscriptions. Much of the population is able to access the internet through their smartphones and mobile networks, which liberal government regulation promotes mobile penetration over fixed line including the deployment of 5G coverage (which testing of began in 2020). Transition to digital transmission of TV/radio networks was done in 2018 with the adaptation of the ISDB-T standard. There are hundreds of privately owned national TV networks, cable TV networks (that also carry international channels), and radio stations available; while there is also 1 government owned broadcast station.

=== Official corruption and foreign investment ===
In an analysis of ARENA's electoral defeat in 2009, the U.S. Embassy in San Salvador pointed to official corruption under the Saca administration as a significant reason for public rejection of continued ARENA government. Subsequent policies under Funes administrations improved El Salvador to foreign investment, and the World Bank in 2014 rated El Salvador 109, a little better than Belize (118) and Nicaragua (119) in the World Bank's annual "Ease of doing business" index.

As per Santander Trade, a Spanish think tank in foreign investment, "Foreign investment into El Salvador has been steadily growing during the last few years. In 2013, the influx of FDI increased. Nevertheless, El Salvador receives less FDI than other countries of Central America. The government has made little progress in terms of improving the business climate. In addition to this, the limited size of its domestic market, weak infrastructures and institutions, as well as the high level of criminality have been real obstacles to investors. However, El Salvador is the second most 'business friendly' country in Central America in terms of business taxation. It also has a young and skilled labour force and a strategic geographical position. The country's membership in the DR-CAFTA, as well as its reinforced integration to the C4 countries (producers of cotton) should lead to an increase of FDI".

Foreign companies have lately resorted to arbitration in international trade tribunals in total disagreement with Salvadoran government policies. In 2008, El Salvador sought international arbitration against Italy's Enel Green Power, on behalf of Salvadoran state-owned electric companies for a geothermal project Enel had invested in. Four years later, Enel indicated it would seek arbitration against El Salvador, blaming the government for technical problems that prevent it from completing its investment.

The government came to its defence claiming that Art 109 of the constitution does not allow any government (regardless of the party they belong), to privatize the resources of the national soil (in this case geothermic energy). The dispute came to an end in December 2014 when both parties came to a settlement, from which no details have been released. The small country had yielded to pressure from the Washington-based powerful ICSID.

In 2009, the U.S. Embassy warned that the Salvadoran government's populist policies of mandating artificially low electricity prices were damaging private sector profitability, including the interests of American investors in the energy sector. The U.S. Embassy noted the corruption of El Salvador's judicial system and quietly urged American businesses to include "arbitration clauses, preferably with a foreign venue", when doing business in the country.

In terms of how people perceived the levels of public corruption in 2014, El Salvador ranks 80 out of 175 countries as per the Corruption Perceptions Index. El Salvador's rating compares relatively well with Panama (94 of 175) and Costa Rica (47 of 175).

=== Tourism ===
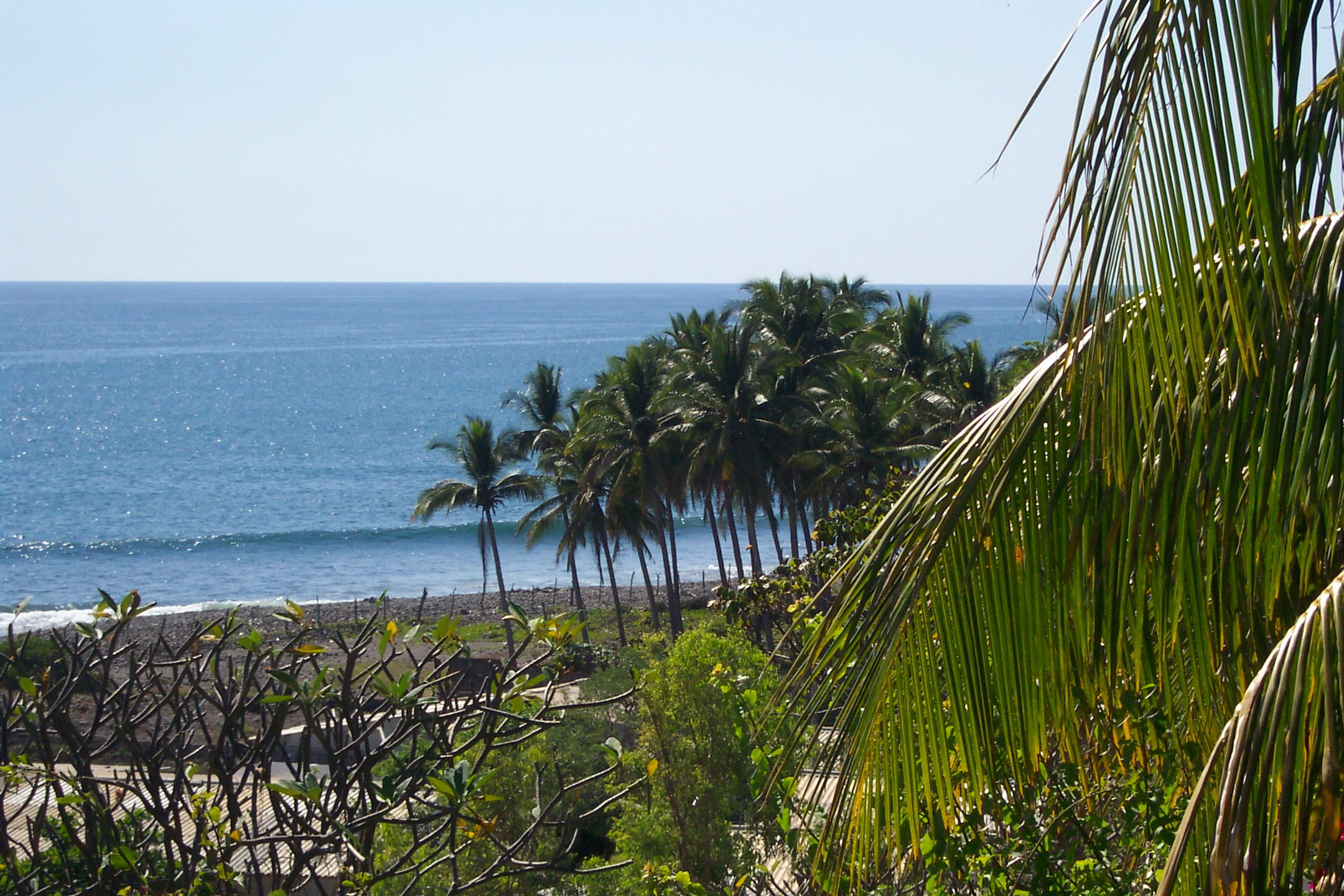
Tropical beach at La Libertad

It was estimated that 1,394,000 international tourists visited El Salvador in 2014. Tourism contributed US$2970.1 million to El Salvador's GDP in 2019. This represented 11% of total GDP. Tourism directly supported 80,500 jobs in 2013. This represented 3.1% of total employment in El Salvador. In 2019, tourism indirectly supported 317,200 jobs, representing 11.6% of total employment in El Salvador.

Most North American and European tourists seek out El Salvador's beaches and nightlife. El Salvador's tourism landscape is slightly different from those of other Central American countries. Because of its geographic size and urbanization there are not many nature-themed tourist destinations such as ecotours or archaeological sites open to the public. Nonetheless, El Salvador remains best known for its beaches and volcanoes. The most frequently visited beaches include El Tunco, Punta Roca, El Sunzal, El Zonte beach, La Costa del Sol, El Majahual, and La Libertad beach. The most hiked volcanoes are Santa Ana and Izalco.

=== Infrastructure ===
The level of access to water supply and sanitation has been increased significantly. A 2015 conducted study by the University of North Carolina called El Salvador the country that has achieved the greatest progress in the world in terms of increased access to water supply and sanitation and the reduction of inequity in access between urban and rural areas. However, water resources are seriously polluted and a large part of the wastewater discharged into the environment without any treatment. Institutionally a single public institution is both de facto in charge of setting sector policy and of being the main service provider. Attempts at reforming and modernizing the sector through new laws have not borne fruit over the past 20 years.

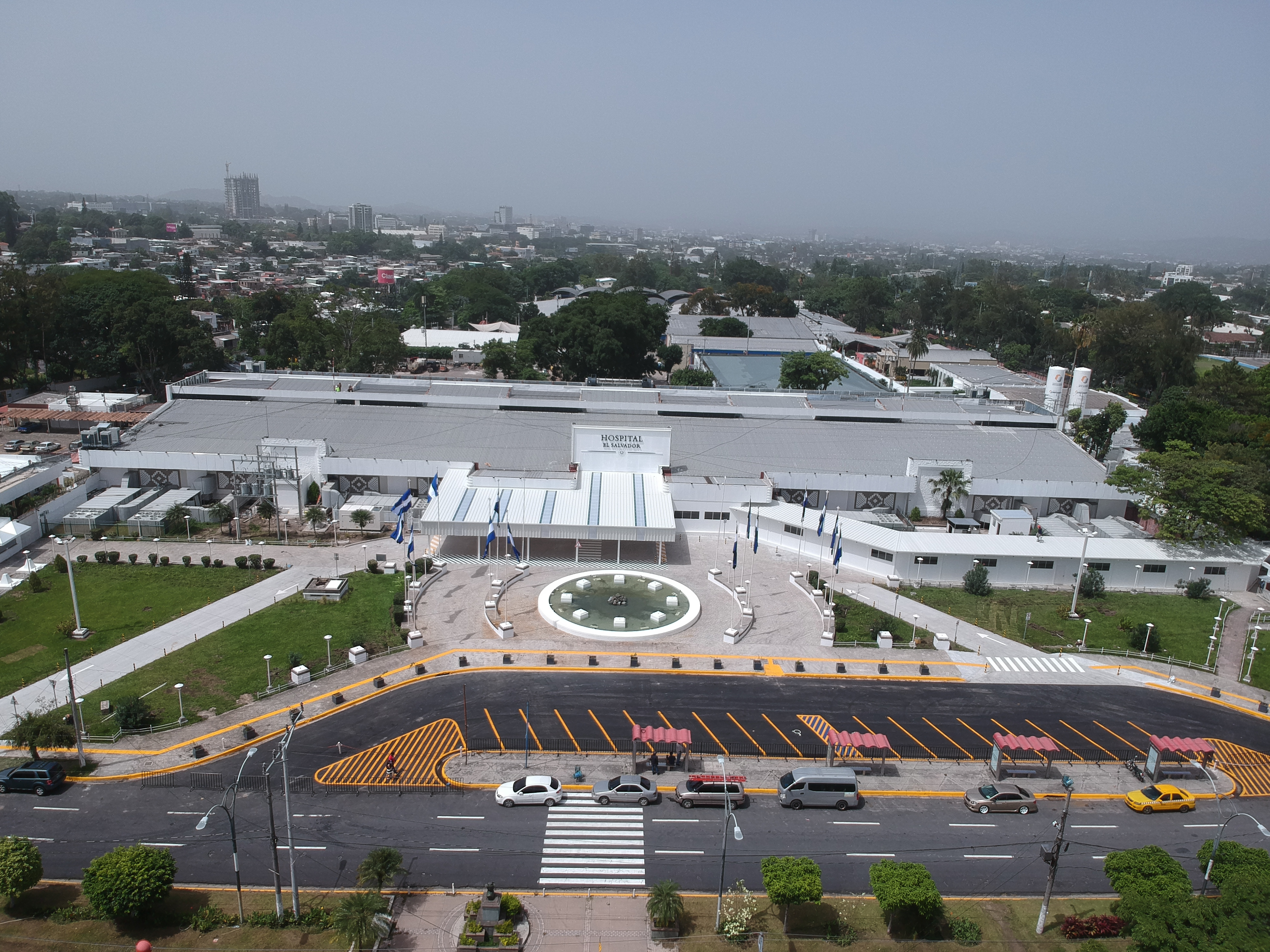
Hospital El Salvador

In response to the COVID-19 pandemic, the government converted the country's main convention centre into Hospital El Salvador to be the largest hospital in Latin America. The facility was inaugurated by the president on 22 June 2020, at which time he announced the hospital conversion would be permanent because of the large investment made. US$25 million was spent on the first phase of the conversion of the former convention centre, with the entire facility costing $75 million and featuring a blood bank, morgue, radiology area, among other amenities. The hospital will have a total capacity of 1,083 ICU beds and 2,000 beds total once phase 3 is completed.

The airport serving international flights in El Salvador is Monseñor Óscar Arnulfo Romero International Airport. This airport is located about 40 km (25 mi) southeast of San Salvador.

== Demographics ==
El Salvador's population was 6,314,167 in 2021, compared to 2,200,000 in 1950. In 2010 the percentage of the population below the age of 15 was 32.1%, 61% were between 15 and 65 years of age, while 6.9% were 65 years or older. The capital city of San Salvador has a population of about 2.1 million people. An estimated 42% of El Salvador's population live in rural areas. Urbanization has expanded at a phenomenal rate in El Salvador since the 1960s, with millions moving to the cities and creating associated problems for urban planning and services.

There are up to 100,000 Nicaraguans living in El Salvador.

Largest cities or towns in El Salvador 2007 El Salvador Bureau of Statistics estimate
Rank	Name	Department	Pop.	Rank	Name	Department	Pop.
1	San Salvador	San Salvador	540,989	11	Colón	La Libertad	96,989
2	Santa Ana	Santa Ana	245,421	12	Tonacatepeque	San Salvador	90,896
3	Soyapango	San Salvador	241,403	13	Opico	La Libertad	74,280
4	San Miguel	San Miguel	218,410	14	Chalchuapa	Santa Ana	74,038
5	Santa Tecla	La Libertad	164,171	15	Usulután	Usulután	73,064
6	Mejicanos	San Salvador	140,751	16	San Martín	San Salvador	72,758
7	Apopa	San Salvador	131,286	17	Sonsonate	Sonsonate	71,541
8	Delgado	San Salvador	120,200	18	Izalco	Sonsonate	70,959
9	Ahuachapán	Ahuachapán	110,511	19	Cuscatancingo	San Salvador	66,400
10	Ilopango	San Salvador	103,862	20	Metapán	Santa Ana	65,826

In the 2024 Global Hunger Index, El Salvador ranks 43rd out of the 127 countries with sufficient data to calculate 2024 GHI scores. With a score of 8.0, El Salvador has a level of hunger that is low.

=== Ethnic groups ===
Around 86% of Salvadorans identify as mestizo, or mixed Amerindian and European descent, 12.7% identify as being of full European ancestry, 0.1% identify as Afro-descended while about 0.6% do not identify with any of the aforementioned categories.

Ethnic Groups in El Salvador
Ethnic Groups	Proportion
Mestizo	86.3%
White	12.7%
Indigenous	0.23%
Black	0.13%
Other	0.64%

Of the population, 0.23% report as fully indigenous. The ethnic groups are Kakawira which represents 0.07% of the total country's population, Nahua (0.06%), Lenca (0.04%) and other minor groups (0.06%). Very few Amerindians have retained their customs and traditions, having over time assimilated into the dominant mestizo culture. There is a small Afro-Salvadoran group that is 0.13% of the total population, with Blacks, among other races, having been prevented from immigrating via government policies in the early 20th century. The descendants of enslaved Africans, however, had already integrated into the Salvadoran population and culture well before, during the colonial and post-colonial period.

Among the various immigrant groups in El Salvador, Palestinians stand out. Though few in number, their descendants have attained great economic and political power in the country, as evidenced by the election of President Antonio Saca, whose opponent in the 2004 election, Schafik Handal, was also of Palestinian descent, and the flourishing commercial, industrial, and construction firms owned by this ethnic group. The current President, Nayib Bukele, is also of Palestinian descent.

As of 2004, there were approximately 3.2 million Salvadorans living outside El Salvador, with the United States traditionally being the destination of choice for Salvadoran economic migrants. By 2012, there were about 2.0 million Salvadoran immigrants and Americans of Salvadoran descent in the U.S., making them the sixth largest immigrant group in the country. The second destination of Salvadorans living outside is Guatemala, with more than 111,000 persons, mainly in Guatemala City. Salvadorans also live in other nearby countries, such as Belize, Honduras and Nicaragua. Other countries with notable Salvadoran communities include Canada, Mexico, the United Kingdom (including the Cayman Islands), Sweden, Brazil, Italy, and Colombia.

=== Languages ===
Spanish is the official language and is spoken by virtually all inhabitants, although a very small number (around 500) of indigenous Pipils speak Nawat. The other indigenous languages, namely Poqomam, Cacaopera, and Lenca, are extinct. Q'eqchi' is spoken by indigenous immigrants of Guatemalan and Belizean origin living in El Salvador.

The local Spanish vernacular is called Caliche, which is considered informal. As in other regions of Central and South America, Salvadorans use voseo. This refers to the use of "vos" as the second person singular pronoun, instead of "tú".

=== Religion ===
Religious background in El Salvador
Religion	Proportion
Catholic	43.3%
Protestant	33.9%
None	18.6%
Other	3%
Agnostic/Atheist	1.2%

The majority of the population in El Salvador is Christian. Catholics (43.3%) and Protestants (33.9%) are the two major religious groups in the country, with the Catholic Church the largest denomination. Those not affiliated with any religious group amount to 18.6% of the population. The remaining is that of 3% Jehovah's Witnesses, Hare Krishnas sect of Hinduism, Muslims, Jews, Buddhists, Latter-day Saints, and those adhering to indigenous religious beliefs, and 1.2% being made up of those who identify as agnostic or atheist. The number of evangelicals in the country is growing rapidly. Óscar Romero, the first Salvadoran saint, was canonized by Pope Francis on 14 October 2018.

=== Education ===
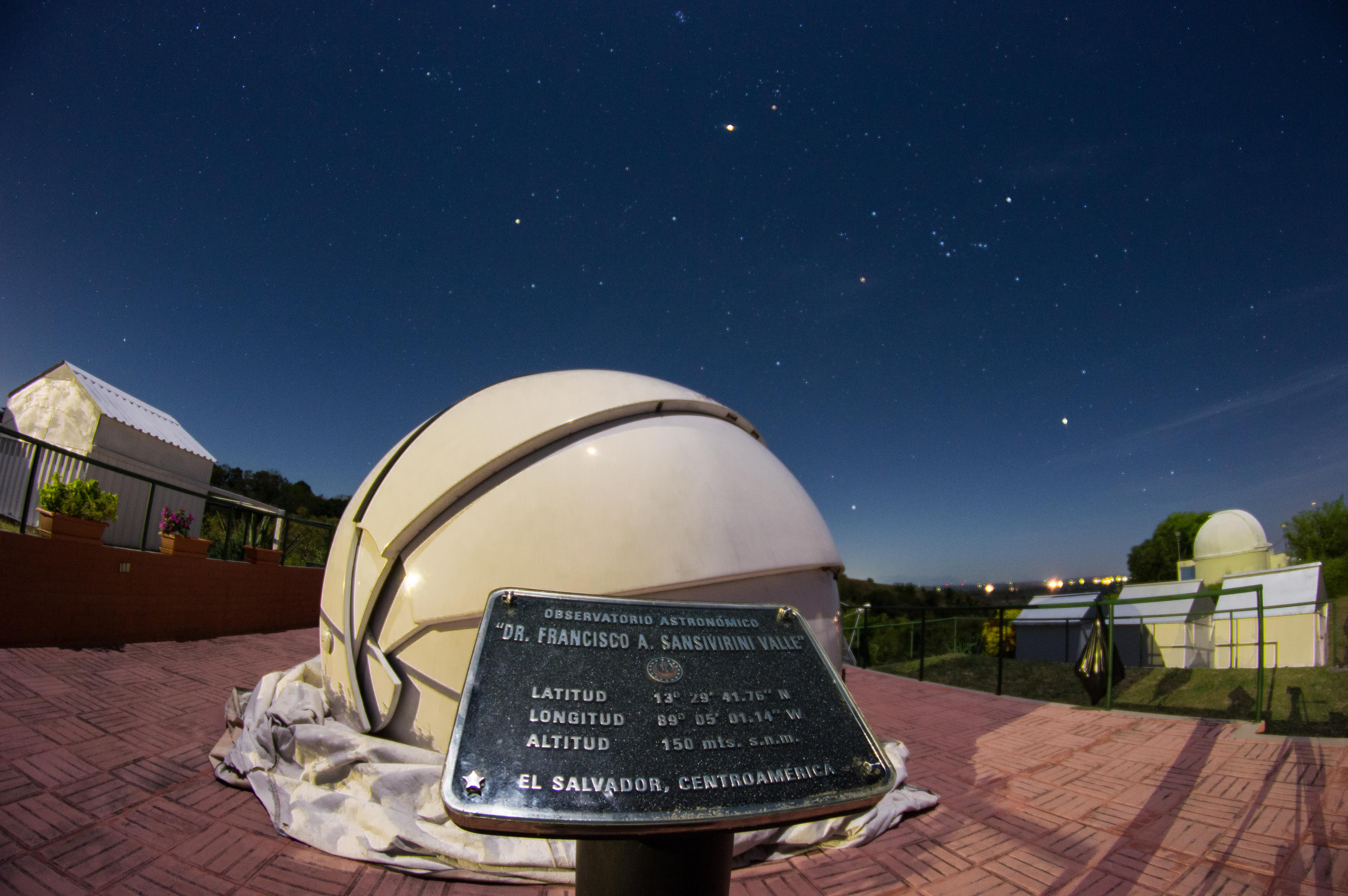
Dr. Prudencio Llach Observatory

The public education system in El Salvador is severely lacking in resources. Class sizes in public schools can be as large as 50 children per classroom. Salvadorans who can afford the cost often choose to send their children to private schools, which are regarded as being better-quality than public schools. Most private schools follow American, European or other advanced systems. Lower-income families are forced to rely on public education.

Education in El Salvador is free through high school. After nine years of basic education (elementary–middle school), students have the option of a two-year high school or a three-year high school. A two-year high school prepares the student for transfer to a university. A three-year high school allows the student to graduate and enter the workforce in a vocational career, or to transfer to a university to further their education in their chosen field.

Universities in El Salvador include a central public institution, the Universidad de El Salvador, and many other specialized private universities. El Salvador was ranked 98th in the Global Innovation Index in 2025, up from 108th in 2019.

=== Crime ===
Since the early twenty-first century, El Salvador has experienced high crime rates, including gang-related crimes and juvenile delinquency. El Salvador had the highest murder rate in the world in 2012 but experienced a sharp decline in 2019 with a new conservative government in power. In 2005 it was considered an epicentre of a gang crisis, along with Guatemala and Honduras. Several journalistic investigations indicate that the government administrations of Carlos Mauricio Funes Cartagena and Salvador Sánchez Cerén, far from working to eradicate violence and the actions of gang groups, made truces with the gangs Barrio 18 and Mara Salvatrucha to keep a certain control over criminal activities and murders in the Salvadoran territory.

In response to this, the government has set up countless programmes to try to guide the youth away from gang membership; so far its efforts have not produced any quick results. One of the government programmes was a gang reform called "Super Mano Dura" (Super Firm Hand). Super Mano Dura had little success and was highly criticized by the United Nations. It experienced temporary success in 2004 but there was a rise in crime after 2005.

==== Homicide rates ====
In 2004, there were 41 intentional homicides per 100,000 citizens, with 60% of the homicides committed being gang-related. In 2012, the homicide rate had increased to 66 per 100,000 inhabitants, more than triple the rate in Mexico. In 2011 there were an estimated 25,000 gang members at large in El Salvador, with another 9,000 in prison. The most well-known gangs, called "maras" in colloquial Spanish, are Mara Salvatrucha and their rivals Barrio 18. Maras are hunted by death squads including Sombra Negra.

In 2015, there were 6,650 homicides recorded in El Salvador. In 2016, at least 5,728 people were murdered. In 2017, there were 3,962 recorded homicides. In 2018, there were 3,340 recorded deaths. In 2019, authorities reported a total of 2,365 homicides. In 2020, there were only 1,322 reported homicides. In 2021, the country recorded 1,140 homicides. According to official data, 2021 had the lowest number of recorded murders since the end of the civil war in 1992.

By 2022, El Salvador had a homicide rate of 7.8 per 100,000 individuals. On 10 May 2023, Bukele stated on Twitter that El Salvador had completed one full year or 365 days since 2019 without a single homicide occurring. This announcement was accompanied by a video detailing his government's claims about this dramatic change in the occurrences of homicide. In 2024, El Salvador reported a homicide rate of 1.9 per 100,000 people, a figure lower than any other Latin American country. This rate represents a 98% decrease in nine years.

==== 2022 crackdown on gangs ====
Beginning on 25 March 2022, three days of gang-related violence occurred that left 87 people dead. In response, President Bukele asked the Salvadoran parliament to ratify a state of emergency. On 26 March, Bukele also ordered the police and army to initiate mass arrests against those responsible for the violence.

A day later, Congress approved a "State of Emergency" that gives legal coverage to arrest any citizen suspected to be a gang member even with no proof. In addition, Congress also approved reforms to increase the maximum sentence for gang membership from 9 to 45 years in prison and punish the dissemination of gang messages, including independent journalism talking about the gang crisis, with up to 15 years in prison.

The law was directed against those who "mark" their territories with acronyms of the gangs, a practice that gang members use to intimidate, and threaten with death those who denounce them to the authorities. The Directorate of Penal Centres began to erase the graffiti that the gangs use to mark the territory in which they operate.

The Mara Salvatrucha (MS-13) and Barrio 18 gangs, among others, were estimated in 2022 to have around some 70,000 members, and as of August 2023, around 72,000 suspected gang members have been sent to prison as a part of the government crackdown on the gangs.

== Culture ==
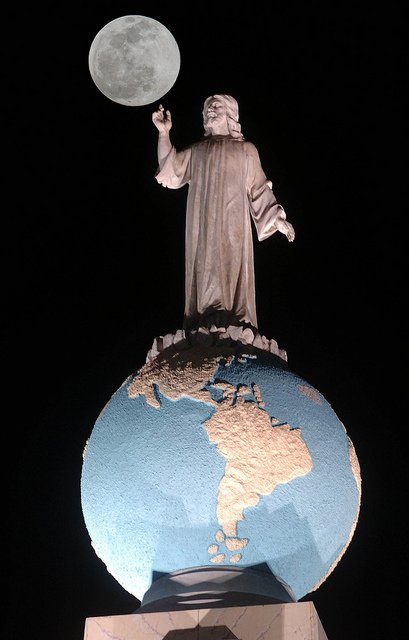
The iconic statue of Christ on the globe sphere of planet earth is part of the Monumento al Divino Salvador del Mundo ('Monument to the Divine Saviour of the World') on Plaza El Salvador del Mundo ('The Saviour of the World Plaza'), a landmark located in El Salvador's capital, San Salvador.

Pulling from indigenous, colonial Spanish and African influences, a composite population was formed as a result of intermarrying between the natives, European settlers, and enslaved Africans. The Catholic Church plays an important role in the Salvadoran culture. Archbishop Óscar Romero is a national hero for his role in resisting human rights violations that were occurring in the lead-up to the Salvadoran Civil War. Significant foreign personalities in El Salvador were the Jesuit priests and professors Ignacio Ellacuría, Ignacio Martín-Baró, and Segundo Montes, who were murdered in 1989 by the Salvadoran Army during the height of the civil war.

Painting, ceramics and textiles are the principal manual artistic mediums. Writers Francisco Gavidia, Salarrué (Salvador Salazar Arrué), Claudia Lars, Alfredo Espino, Pedro Geoffroy Rivas, Manlio Argueta, José Roberto Cea, and poet Roque Dalton are important writers from El Salvador. Notable 20th-century personages include the late filmmaker Baltasar Polio, female film director Patricia Chica, artist Fernando Llort, and caricaturist Toño Salazar.

Among the more renowned representatives of the graphic arts are the painters Studio Lenca, Augusto Crespin, Noe Canjura, Carlos Cañas, Giovanni Gil, Julia Díaz, Mauricio Mejia, Maria Elena Palomo de Mejia, Camilo Minero, Ricardo Carbonell, Roberto Huezo, Miguel Angel Cerna, (the painter and writer better known as MACLo), Esael Araujo, and many others.

=== Music ===
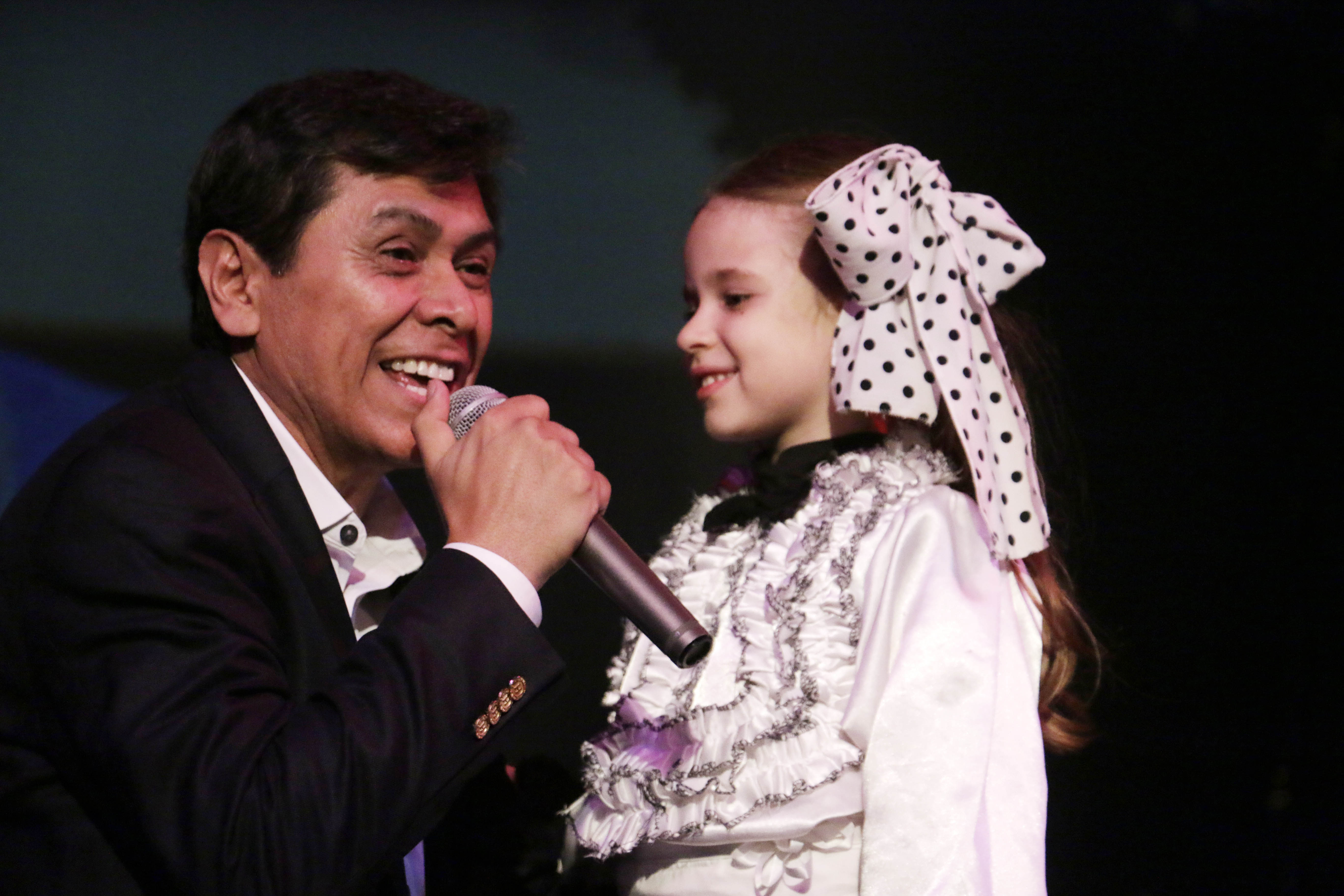
Álvaro Torres is one of the most famous Salvadoran singers mainly in the Latin pop genre, romantic ballads and boleros.

Traditional Salvadoran music is a mixture of indigenous, Spanish, and African influences. It includes religious songs (mostly used to celebrate Christmas and other holidays, especially feast days of the saints). Other musical repertoire consists of danza, pasillo, marcha and cancione which are composed of parading bands, street performances, or onstage dances, either in groups or paired. Satirical and rural lyrical themes are common. Traditional instruments used are the marimba, tepehuaste, flutes, drums, scrapers and gourds, as well as guitars among others. El Salvador's well known folk dance is known as Xuc which originated in Cojutepeque, Cuscatlan. Caribbean, Colombian, and Mexican music has become customary listening radio and party in the country, especially boleros, cumbia, merengue, Latin pop, salsa, bachata, and reggaeton.

=== Cuisine ===
One of El Salvador's notable dishes is the pupusa. Pupusas are handmade maize tortillas (made of masa de maíz or masa de arroz, a maize or rice flour dough used in Latin American cuisine) stuffed with one or more of the following: cheese (usually a soft Salvadoran cheese such as quesillo, similar to mozzarella), chicharrón, or refried beans. Sometimes the filling is queso con loroco (cheese combined with loroco, a vine flower bud native to Central America). Pupusas revueltas are pupusas filled with beans, cheese and pork. There are also vegetarian options. Some adventurous restaurants even offer pupusas stuffed with shrimp or spinach. The name pupusa comes from the Pipil-Nahuatl word, pupushahua. The origins of the pupusa are debated, although its presence in El Salvador is known to predate the arrival of the Spaniards.

In El Salvador, the pupusa is considered a Mesoamerican ancestral legacy and the most popular dish nationally. It has been designated as the "National Dish of El Salvador" via the Legislative Decree no. 655 in the Salvadoran Constitution. The decree also indicates that every second Sunday in November, the country will celebrate the "National Day of the Pupusas".

Two other typical Salvadoran dishes are yuca frita and panes con pollo. Yuca frita is deep fried cassava root served with curtido (a pickled cabbage, onion and carrot topping) and pork rinds with pescaditas (fried baby sardines). Yuca is sometimes served boiled instead of fried. Pan con pollo/pavo (bread with chicken/turkey) are warm turkey or chicken-filled submarine sandwiches. The bird is marinated and then roasted with spices and hand-pulled. This sandwich is traditionally served with tomato and watercress along with cucumber, onion, lettuce, mayonnaise, and mustard.

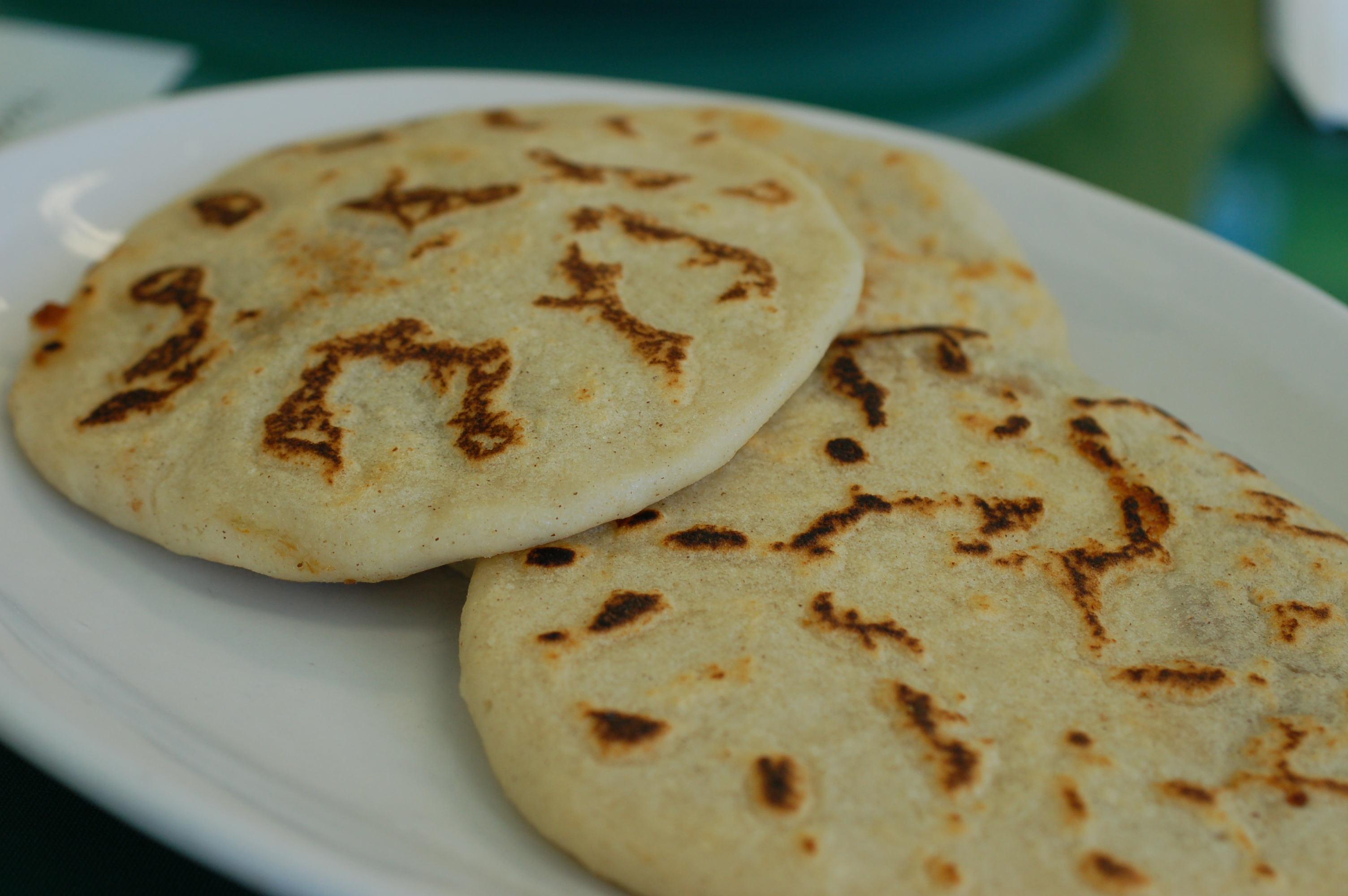
Pupusas, the national and most famous dish of El Salvador

One of El Salvador's typical breakfasts is fried plantain, usually served with cream. It is common in Salvadoran restaurants and homes, including those of immigrants to the United States. Alguashte, a condiment made from dried, ground pepitas, is commonly incorporated into savoury and sweet Salvadoran dishes. "Maria Luisa" is a dessert commonly found in El Salvador. It is a layered cake that is soaked in orange marmalade and sprinkled with powdered sugar. One of the most popular desserts is the cake Pastel de tres leches (Cake of three milks), consisting of three types of milk: evaporated milk, condensed milk, and cream.

A popular drink that Salvadorans enjoy is horchata. Horchata is most commonly made of the morro seed ground into a powder and added to milk or water, and sugar. Horchata is drunk year-round, and can be drunk at any time of day. It mostly is accompanied by a plate of pupusas or fried yuca. Horchata from El Salvador has a very distinct taste and is not to be confused with Mexican horchata, which is rice-based. Coffee is also a common morning beverage. Other popular drinks in El Salvador include ensalada, a drink made of chopped fruit swimming in fruit juice, and Kolachampan, a sugar cane-flavoured carbonated beverage.

=== Sport ===
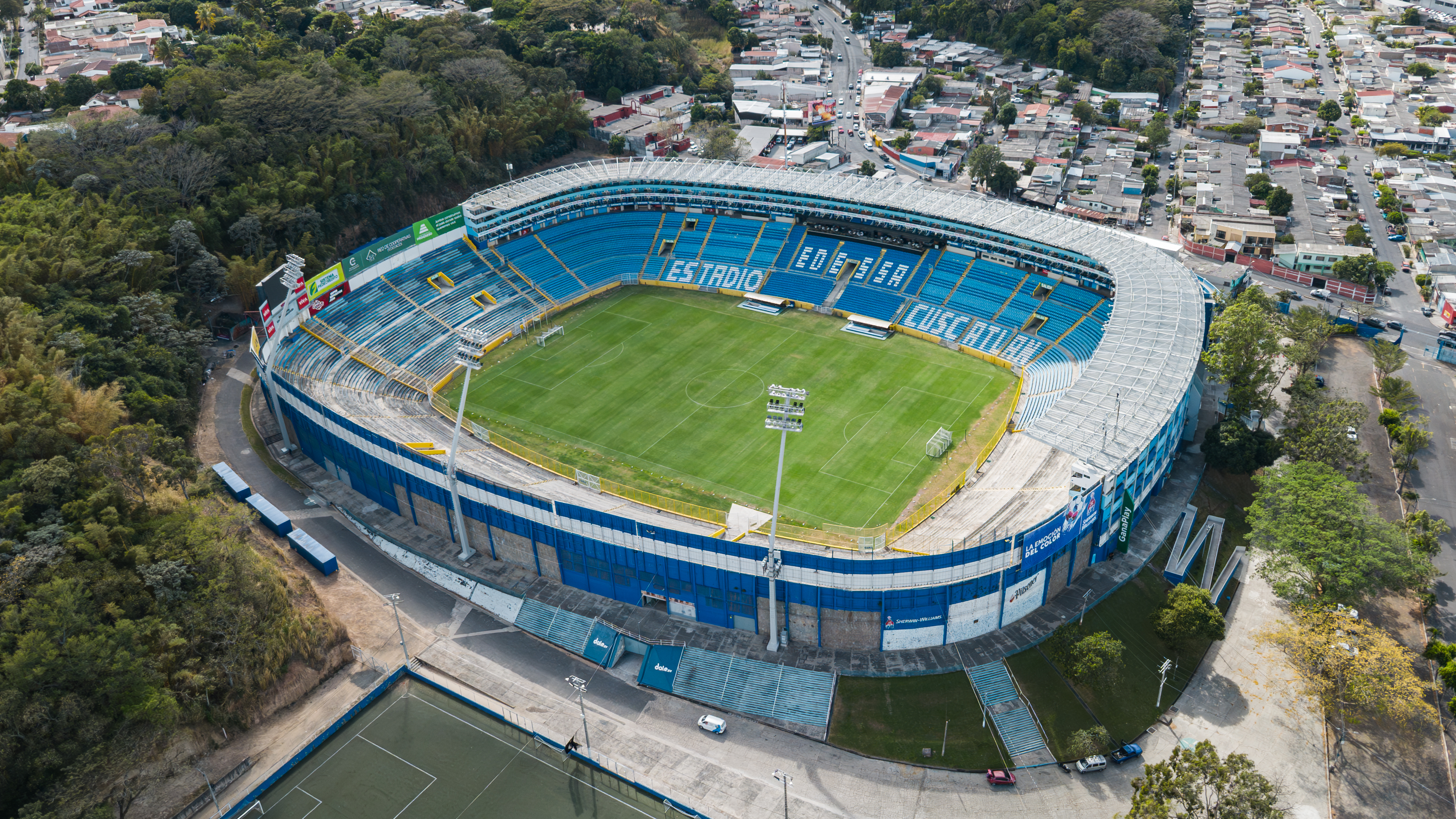
The Estadio Cuscatlán in San Salvador is the largest stadium in Central America.

Football is the most popular sport in El Salvador. The El Salvador national football team qualified for the FIFA World Cup in 1970 and 1982. Their qualification for the 1970 tournament was marred by the Football War, a war against Honduras, whose team El Salvador's had defeated. The national football team play at the Estadio Cuscatlán in San Salvador. It opened in 1976 and seats 53,400, making it the largest stadium in Central America and the Caribbean.

== See also ==
- List of Salvadorans
- Outline of El Salvador
- Health in El Salvador
