= 88th meridian west =

Line of longitude

88th meridian west (interactive map)

The meridian 88° west of Greenwich is a line of longitude that extends from the North Pole across the Arctic Ocean, North America, the Gulf of Mexico, the Caribbean Sea, Central America, the Pacific Ocean, the Southern Ocean, and Antarctica to the South Pole.

The 88th meridian west forms a great circle with the 92nd meridian east.

== From Pole to Pole ==
Starting at the North Pole and heading south to the South Pole, the 88th meridian west passes through:

Co-ordinates	Country, territory or sea	Notes
90°0′N 88°0′W	Arctic Ocean	
82°6′N 88°0′W	Canada	Nunavut — Ellesmere Island
80°41′N 88°0′W	Nansen Sound	
80°26′N 88°0′W	Canada	Nunavut — Axel Heiberg Island
78°29′N 88°0′W	Norwegian Bay	
77°49′N 88°0′W	Canada	Nunavut — Ellesmere Island
77°36′N 88°0′W	Norwegian Bay	
77°7′N 88°0′W	Canada	Nunavut — Ellesmere Island
76°22′N 88°0′W	Jones Sound	
75°31′N 88°0′W	Canada	Nunavut — Devon Island
74°28′N 88°0′W	Lancaster Sound	
73°39′N 88°0′W	Canada	Nunavut — Baffin Island
70°18′N 88°0′W	Gulf of Boothia	
68°48′N 88°0′W	Canada	Nunavut — Simpson Peninsula (mainland)
68°14′N 88°0′W	Committee Bay	
67°38′N 88°0′W	Canada	Nunavut — mainland
64°17′N 88°0′W	Hudson Bay	
56°28′N 88°0′W	Canada	Ontario — mainland and St. Ignace Island
48°44′N 88°0′W	Lake Superior	
47°28′N 88°0′W	United States	Michigan — Keweenaw Peninsula
47°18′N 88°0′W	Lake Superior	Keweenaw Bay
46°54′N 88°0′W	United States	Michigan; Wisconsin — from 45°47′N 88°0′W, passing through Milwaukee (at 43°2′N 88°0′W); Illinois — from 42°30′N 88°0′W, passing through the outskirts of Chicago (at 41°55′N 88°0′W); Indiana — for about 2 km from 38°6′N 88°0′W; Illinois — for about 4 km from 38°5′N 88°0′W; Indiana — from 38°3′N 88°0′W; Kentucky — from 37°47′N 88°0′W; Tennessee — from 36°41′N 88°0′W; Alabama — from 35°0′N 88°0′W
30°42′N 88°0′W	Mobile Bay	
30°14′N 88°0′W	United States	Alabama — Mobile Point peninsula
30°13′N 88°0′W	Gulf of Mexico	
21°36′N 88°0′W	Mexico	Yucatán; Quintana Roo — from 20°24′N 88°0′W
18°27′N 88°0′W	Chetumal Bay	
17°54′N 88°0′W	Belize	Ambergris Caye
17°47′N 88°0′W	Caribbean Sea	Passing by several islands of Belize
15°47′N 88°0′W	Honduras	Passing just east of San Pedro Sula at 15°30′N 88°2′W
13°52′N 88°0′W	El Salvador	Morazán — Passing through the districts of Corinto, Sociedad, and Jocoro. La Unión — Passing through the districts of Yucuaiquín, Yayantique, El Carmen and Intipucá from 13°34′N 88°0′W
13°9′N 88°0′W	Pacific Ocean	
60°0′S 88°0′W	Southern Ocean	
72°46′S 88°0′W	Antarctica	Territory claimed by Chile (Antártica Chilena Province)

Next westward: 89th meridian west	88th meridian west forms a great circle with 92nd meridian east	Next eastward: 87th meridian west

== See also ==
- 87th meridian west
- 89th meridian west
