= February 2001 El Salvador earthquake =

Second major earthquake in El Salvador

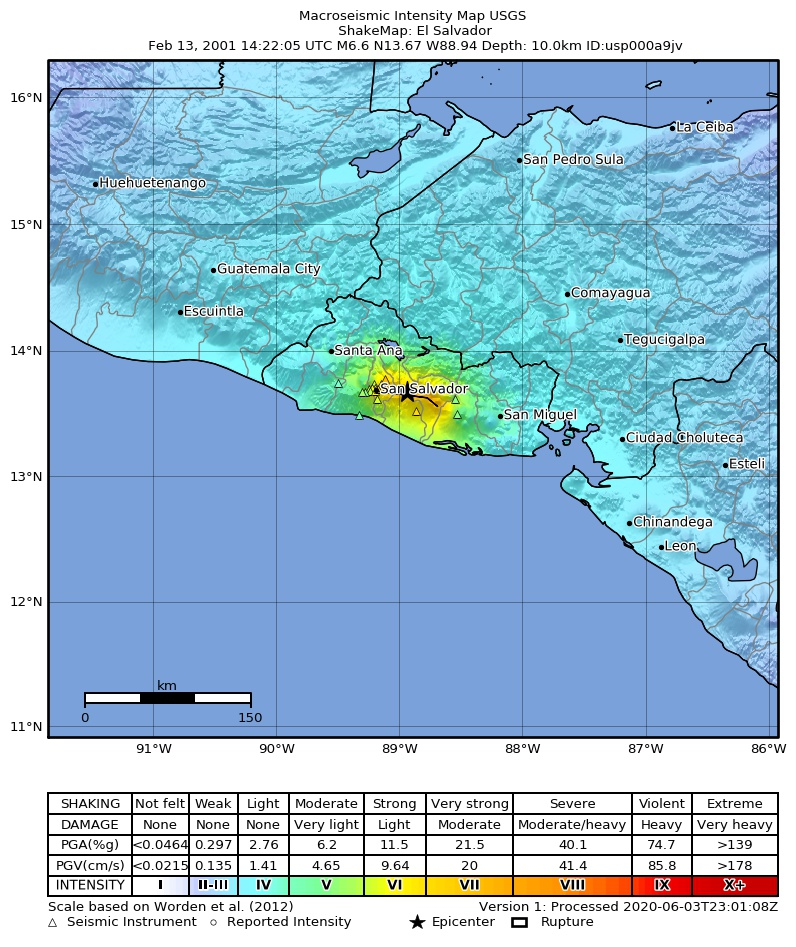
- USGS ShakeMap

- Location within El Salvador Location within Central America
- UTC time: 2001-02-13 14:22:05
- ISC event: 1780618
- USGS-ANSS: ComCat
- Local date: February 13, 2001
- Local time: 08:22
- Magnitude: M_{w} 6.6
- Depth: 10 km (6.2 mi)
- Epicenter: 13.67°N 88.93°W
- Type: Strike-slip
- Areas affected: central El Salvador
- Max. intensity: MMI IX (Violent)
- Casualties: 315 fatalities, 3,399 injuries, 92 missing

The February 2001 El Salvador earthquake occurred with a magnitude of M_{w} 6.6 on 13 February at 08:22:05 CTZ (14:22 UTC), with an epicenter located in Cuscatlán Department. At least 315 people were killed, 92 were missing, nearly 3,400 were injured, and extensive damage occurred in multiple departments, with over 61,500 homes damaged or destroyed.

== Tectonic setting ==
El Salvador lies above the convergent boundary where oceanic crust of the Cocos plate is being subducted beneath the Caribbean plate at rate of about 72 mm per year along the Middle America Trench. This boundary is associated with earthquakes resulting from movement on the plate interface itself, such as the M_{w} 7.7 1992 Nicaragua earthquake, and from faulting within both the overriding Caribbean plate and the subducting Cocos plate, such as the 1982 El Salvador earthquake.

== Earthquake ==
Estimated number of people exposed to shaking levels
MMI	Population exposure
MMI IX (Violent)	1,200k
MMI VIII (Severe)	1,000k
MMI VII (Very strong)	835k
MMI VI (Strong)	1,110k
MMI V (Moderate)	7,097k

The earthquake's epicenter was located in Cuscatlán Department, 5 km (3.1 mi) south of Cojutepeque, the department's capital. According to the United States Geological Survey, the earthquake had a maximum Modified Mercalli intensity of IX (Violent). Shaking levels of MMI VII-VIII (Very Strong-Severe) were estimated in Cuscatlán, La Paz, San Vicente, San Salvador and Usulután Departments, with areas of Guatemala, Honduras, Nicaragua, Mexico, Costa Rica and Belize also thought to have been affected by mild tremors. The focal mechanism and depth of the earthquake are consistent with shallow strike-slip faulting in the Caribbean plate, along the line of the active volcanic belt. The fault trend is confirmed by the distribution of aftershocks. Despite its magnitude and shallow focus, there are no indications of surface rupture for this earthquake.

The earthquake occurred exactly a month after the major earthquake in January that affected the same area of the country. It remains unclear whether or not the two events are related in any way. Some previous earthquakes that were associated with the subduction zone were followed within a few years by shallow events. Examples include shallow earthquakes in 1917 and 1919 following a subduction event in 1915, and the shallow earthquake in 1936 following a subduction event in 1932.

== Damage and casualties ==
At least 315 people died, 92 were left missing and a further 3,399 were injured; there were 165 deaths in Cuscatlán, 87 in San Vicente, 58 in La Paz, 4 in San Salvador and 1 in Morazán, with damage and injuries also recorded in Cabañas, Usulután, Chalatenango and San Miguel. A total of 44,750 houses were destroyed and 16,752 others, 83 public buildings, 111 schools, 97 churches 5 hospitals and 36 other health facilities were damaged. Almost every single house in Verapaz and Guadalupe reportedly collapsed. In Jerusalén, six people died and 95% of homes were damaged or destroyed, and 12 deaths occurred in San Cayetano Istepeque, where 90% of houses collapsed. In San Vicente, 60% of homes were badly damaged or destroyed, with the municipal hall having to be demolished. About 90% of infrastructure was destroyed and 25 people were killed in Candelaria, Cuscatlán, including 23 students and one teacher after a school collapsed. In Cojutepeque, 55 people died and 90% of homes were affected, while half of the houses in Santa Cruz Michapa were badly damaged. In Cinquera, Cabañas, 20 homes collapsed and 75% of structures were damaged, while in Santa María Ostuma, La Paz, 95% of houses were destroyed. In Chalatenango, 50 buildings were razed and 90% of homes collapsed in San Luis del Carmen.

The earthquake exacerbated some of the landslides caused by the January event but also triggered new ones, with one burying a school near Lake Ilopango, injuring several students. About 85% of homes surrounding the lake collapsed. Five villages near the San Vicente volcano were heavily damaged, with 25 landslides around the volcano burying about 200 people. In Candelaria, 15 people attempting to recover the body of a child killed by a landslide in the January earthquake were buried by a second landslide, while in San Agustín, six women were buried by another landslide while washing clothes at a river. In San Martín, seven people were buried by a landslide, while 20 others were buried in Zacatecoluca.

== See also ==
- List of earthquakes in 2001
- List of earthquakes in El Salvador
