= List of earthquakes in 2001 =

Earthquakes in 2001
Approximate epicenters of notable earthquakes in 2001
- 4.0–5.9 magnitude
- 6.0–6.9 magnitude
- 7.0–7.9 magnitude
- 8.0+ magnitude
- Strongest: 8.4 M_{w} Peru
- Deadliest: 7.7 M_{w} India; 20,023 deaths
- Total fatalities: 21,465

Number by magnitude
- 9.0+: 0
- 8.0–8.9: 1
- 7.0–7.9: 14
- 6.0–6.9: 122
- 5.0–5.9: 1,212
- 4.0–4.9: 7,968

This is a list of earthquakes in 2001. Only earthquakes of magnitude 6 or above are included, unless they result in significant damage and/or casualties. All dates are listed according to UTC time. The maximum intensities are based on the Modified Mercalli intensity scale. Earthquake magnitudes are based on data from the USGS. Fourteen earthquakes ≥M7 occurred within the year, along with one ≥M8 event.

Throughout the year, earthquakes killed 21,465 people; the vast majority of the fatalities were attributed to an unusually powerful M_{w} 7.7 earthquake intraplate earthquake that struck the Indian state of Gujarat. Early in the year, two earthquakes struck El Salvador, killing nearly 1,300 people and causing damage across the entire country. The largest event of the year, a M_{w} 8.4 earthquake, struck off Peru's southern coast and triggered a large tsunami. Other notable earthquakes struck Japan, the United States and China.

== Compared to other years ==
Number of earthquakes worldwide for 1999–2009 []
Magnitude	1999	2000	2001	2002	2003	2004	2005	2006	2007	2008	2009
8.0–9.9	0	1	1	0	1	2	1	2	4	1	1
7.0–7.9	18	15	14	13	14	14	10	9	14	12	16
6.0–6.9	117	145	122	126	139	141	139	142	178	167	143
5.0–5.9	1,057	1,334	1,212	1,170	1,212	1,511	1,694	1,726	2,090	1,786	1,912
4.0–4.9	7,004	7,968	7,969	8,479	8,455	10,880	13,893	12,843	12,081	12,294	6,817
Total	8,296	9,462	9,319	9,788	9,823	12,551	15,738	14,723	14,367	14,261	8,891

== Overall ==
=== By death toll ===
Rank	Death toll	Magnitude	Location	MMI	Depth (km)	Date
1	20,023	7.7	India, Gujarat	XII (Extreme)	16.0	January 26
2	952	7.7	El Salvador, La Libertad offshore	VIII (Severe)	60.0	January 13
3	315	6.6	El Salvador, Cuscatlán	IX (Violent)	10.0	February 13
4	145	8.4	Peru, Arequipa offshore	VIII (Severe)	33.0	June 23

- Note: At least 10 fatalities

=== By magnitude ===
Rank	Magnitude	Death toll	Location	MMI	Depth (km)	Date
1	8.4	145	Peru, Arequipa offshore	VIII (Severe)	33.0	June 23
2	7.8	0	China, Qinghai	X (Extreme)	10.0	November 14
3	7.7	952	El Salvador, La Libertad offshore	VIII (Severe)	60.0	January 13
3	7.7	20,023	India, Gujarat	XII (Extreme)	16.0	January 26
4	7.6	1	Peru, Arequipa offshore	IX (Violent)	33.0	July 7
5	7.5	0	Indonesia, Southeast Sulawesi offshore	VII (Very strong)	33.0	October 19
5	7.5	0	Philippines, Davao offshore	VIII (Severe)	33.0	January 1
6	7.4	0	Indonesia, Bengkulu offshore	VII (Very strong)	36.0	February 13
7	7.2	0	New Zealand, Kermadec Islands offshore	I (Not felt)	178.1	June 3
8	7.1	0	New Zealand, Gisborne offshore	I (Not felt)	33.0	August 21
8	7.1	0	Vanuatu, Sanma offshore	VII (Very strong)	103.0	January 9
8	7.1	0	south of Australia	I (Not felt)	10.0	December 12
8	7.1	0	Indonesia, North Maluku offshore	VII (Very strong)	36.0	February 24
9	7.0	0	Guam offshore	VII (Very strong)	37.0	October 12
9	7.0	0	Papua New Guinea, West New Britain	VIII (Severe)	33.0	October 31

- Note: At least 7.0 magnitude

== By month ==
=== January ===
January
- Strongest: 7.7 M_{w} India; 7.7 M_{w} El Salvador
- Deadliest: 7.7 M_{w} (India) India; 20,023 deaths
- Total fatalities: 20,975

Number by magnitude
- 9.0+: 0
- 8.0–8.9: 0
- 7.0–7.9: 4
- 6.0–6.9: 12
- 5.0–5.9: 137
- 4.0–4.9: 568

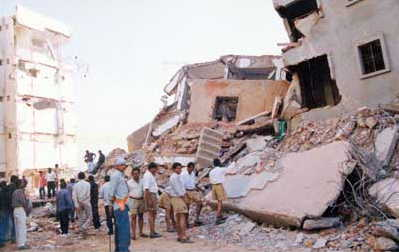
Collapsed buildings in Bhuj, Gujarat

Date	Country and location	M_{w}	Depth (km)	MMI	Notes	Casualties	
Date	Country and location	M_{w}	Depth (km)	MMI	Notes	Dead	Injured
1	Philippines, Davao offshore, 21 km (13 mi) southeast of Lukatan	7.5	33.0	VIII	-	-	-
1	Philippines, Davao offshore, 67 km (42 mi) southeast of Lukatan	6.8	33.0	VII	Aftershock of the 7.5 event nearly two hours earlier.	-	-
2	Philippines, Davao offshore, 51 km (32 mi) southeast of Lukatan	6.4	33.0	VII	Aftershock of the 7.5 event a day prior.	-	-
2	Solomon Islands, Malkira-Ulawa offshore, 96 km (60 mi) southeast of Kirakira	6.0	33.0	VII	-	-	-
9	Vanuatu, Sanma offshore, 16 km (9.9 mi) northeast of Port Olry	7.1	103.0	VII	-	-	-
10	United States, Alaska offshore, 47 km (29 mi) south of Old Harbor	6.9	36.4	VIII	-	-	-
11	Canada, British Columbia offshore, 247 km (153 mi) southwest of Port McNeill	6.0	10.0	-	-	-	-
13	El Salvador, La Libertad offshore, 28 km (17 mi) south-southwest of Puerto El Triunfo	7.7	60.0	VIII	Further information: January 2001 El Salvador earthquake	952	5,565
15	Mid-Indian Ridge	6.4	10.0	-	-	-	-
16	Indonesia, Bengkulu offshore, 60 km (37 mi) west-southwest of Bengkulu	6.0	33.0	V	Foreshock of the 6.9 event eight seconds later.	-	-
16	Indonesia, Bengkulu offshore, 59 km (37 mi) west-southwest of Bengkulu	6.9	28.0	VI	-	-	-
19	Mexico, Chiapas, 6 km (3.7 mi) north-northeast of Hidalgo	6.0	93.2	V	-	-	-
19	Mexico, Temotu, 121 km (75 mi) south-southeast of Lata	6.3	50.0	VII	-	-	-
19	(South Georgia and the South Sandwich Islands) east of the South Sandwich Islands	6.0	33.0	-	-	-	-
26	India, Gujarat, 17 km (11 mi) northwest of Bhachau	7.7	16.0	XII	Further information: 2001 Gujarat earthquake	20,023	166,951
29	Indonesia, West Papua offshore, 83 km (52 mi) west-northwest of Manokwari	6.2	33.0	IX	-	-	-

=== February ===
February
- Strongest: 7.4 M_{w} Indonesia
- Deadliest: 6.6 M_{w} El Salvador; 315 deaths
- Total fatalities: 320

Number by magnitude
- 9.0+: 0
- 8.0–8.9: 0
- 7.0–7.9: 2
- 6.0–6.9: 14
- 5.0–5.9: 104
- 4.0–4.9: 593

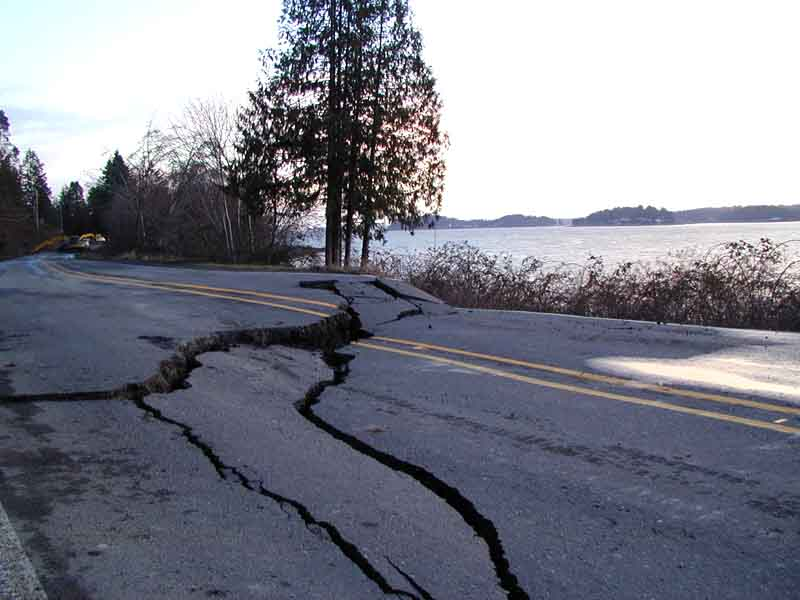
A stretch of Washington State Route 302 near Allyn, Washington, damaged after the earthquake.

Date	Country and location	M_{w}	Depth (km)	MMI	Notes	Casualties	
Date	Country and location	M_{w}	Depth (km)	MMI	Notes	Dead	Injured
1	United States, Alaska offshore, 94 km (58 mi) west-southwest of Adak	6.0	33.0	I	-	-	-
8	India, Gujarat, 24 km (15 mi) west-northwest of Rapar	5.1	10.0	VII	Aftershock of the 2001 Gujarat earthquake. At least 40 people injured in the epicentral area.	-	40
13	El Salvador, Cuscatlán, 5 km (3.1 mi) south of Cojutepeque	6.6	10.0	IX	Further information: February 2001 El Salvador earthquake	315	3,399
13	Indonesia, Bengkulu offshore, 102 km (63 mi) south-southeast of Bengkulu	7.4	36.0	VII	-	-	-
14	Fiji, Eastern offshore, 187 km (116 mi) south of Nadi	6.1	10.0	V	-	-	-
14	Fiji, Eastern offshore, 204 km (127 mi) south-southwest of Suva	6.2	10.0	V	-	-	-
16	Indonesia, West Nusa Tenggara offshore, 138 km (86 mi) north of Pototano	6.1	521.0	IV	-	-	-
17	Canada, British Columbia offshore, 151 km (94 mi) south-southwest of Hydaburg, United States	6.2	20.0	V	Objects knocked from shelves in the Massett-Daajing Giids-Skidegate area.	-	-
17	El Salvador, San Salvador, 1 km (0.62 mi) east-northeast of Tonacatepeque	4.1	10.0	VI	One person killed, three others injured, additional damage and landslides in the epicentral area.	1	3
18	South Africa, Prince Edward Islands region offshore	6.0	10.0	-	-	-	-
19	Laos, Phongsaly, 31 km (19 mi) west of Điện Biên Phủ, Vietnam	4.9	10.0	VII	Several people injured and many buildings damaged in the Điện Biên Phủ area, Vietnam.	-	Several
23	China, Sichuan, 96 km (60 mi) southwest of Kangding	5.6	33.0	VIII	Three people killed, 109 injured and 60,000 homes destroyed in Kangding and Yajiang counties.	3	109
24	Indonesia, North Maluku offshore, 137 km (85 mi) west-northwest of Ternate	7.1	35.0	VII	-	-	-
24	Indonesia, North Maluku offshore, 135 km (84 mi) northwest of Ternate	6.2	35.0	-	Aftershock of the 7.1 event almost seven hours prior.	-	-
25	Afghanistan, Badakhshan, 49 km (30 mi) south of Jurm	6.2	202.5	V	-	-	-
26	Russia, Sakhalin offshore, 135 km (84 mi) east of Korsakov	6.1	392.0	I	-	-	-
28	Vanuatu, Tafea offshore, 245 km (152 mi) east of Tadine	6.7	10.0	-	-	-	-
28	Vanuatu, Tafea offshore, 235 km (146 mi) east-southeast of Tadine	6.3	10.0	-	Aftershock of the 6.7 event 35 minutes earlier.	-	-
28	El Salvador, Usulután, 24 km (15 mi) south of Zacatecoluca	6.1	65.3	V	Landslides occurred in central and western El Salvador.	-	-
28	United States, Washington, 7 km (4.3 mi) south-southeast of Longbranch	6.8	51.8	VIII	Further information: 2001 Nisqually earthquake	1	400

=== March ===
March
- Strongest: 6.8 M_{w} Japan
- Deadliest: 6.8 M_{w} (Japan) Japan; 2 deaths
- Total fatalities: 2

Number by magnitude
- 9.0+: 0
- 8.0–8.9: 0
- 7.0–7.9: 0
- 6.0–6.9: 8
- 5.0–5.9: 88
- 4.0–4.9: 612

Date	Country and location	M_{w}	Depth (km)	MMI	Notes	Casualties	
Date	Country and location	M_{w}	Depth (km)	MMI	Notes	Dead	Injured
6	Macquarie Island region offshore	6.4	10.0	-	-	-	-
7	Ascension Island offshore, 206 km (128 mi) northeast of Georgetown	6.0	10.0	-	-	-	-
14	Indonesia, Gorontalo, 130 km (81 mi) west of Gorontalo	6.0	109.4	V	-	-	-
15	India, Nicobar Islands offshore	6.0	33.0	VII	-	-	-
15	Chile, Valparaíso offshore, 28 km (17 mi) west-northwest of La Ligua	6.0	37.0	VII	-	-	-
19	Indonesia, Maluku offshore, 41 km (25 mi) south-southwest of Ambon	6.5	33.0	VII	-	-	-
23	Russia, Sakhalin Oblast offshore, 111 km (69 mi) east-northeast of Shikotan	6.0	33.0	III	-	-	-
24	Japan, Hiroshima offshore, 16 km (9.9 mi) south-southwest of Kure	6.8	50.0	IX	Further information: 2001 Geiyo earthquake	2	288

=== April ===
April
- Strongest: 6.9 M_{w} Fiji
- Deadliest: 5.6 M_{w} China; 2 deaths
- Total fatalities: 2

Number by magnitude
- 9.0+: 0
- 8.0–8.9: 0
- 7.0–7.9: 0
- 6.0–6.9: 11
- 5.0–5.9: 92
- 4.0–4.9: 713

Date	Country and location	M_{w}	Depth (km)	MMI	Notes	Casualties	
Date	Country and location	M_{w}	Depth (km)	MMI	Notes	Dead	Injured
3	Japan, Shizuoka, 10 km (6.2 mi) northeast of Mori	5.4	33.0	VII	Eight people injured, furniture overturned and windows and water pipes broken in Shizuoka Prefecture.	-	8
4	Indonesia, Maluku offshore, 65 km (40 mi) northwest of Tual	6.4	33.0	VII	-	-	-
7	New Zealand, Kermadec Islands offshore	6.2	33.0	-	-	-	-
9	Chile, Valparaíso offshore, 144 km (89 mi) west-northwest of Valparaíso	6.7	11.0	V	-	-	-
12	China, Yunnan, 147 km (91 mi) southwest of Dali	5.6	10.0	VIII	Two people killed, 190 injured, 30,000 houses destroyed and landslides blocked roads in Shidian County.	2	190
13	South Georgia and the South Sandwich Islands, South Sandwich Islands offshore	6.2	26.0	-	-	-	-
14	Japan, Izu Islands offshore	6.0	10.0	-	-	-	-
19	Solomon Islands, Western offshore, 126 km (78 mi) northwest of Gizo	6.0	12.0	VI	Foreshocks of the 6.7 event later that day.	-	-
19	Solomon Islands, Western offshore, 121 km (75 mi) south-southeast of Panguna, Papua New Guinea	6.2	20.0	VI	Foreshocks of the 6.7 event later that day.	-	-
19	Solomon Islands, Western offshore, 128 km (80 mi) south-southeast of Panguna, Papua New Guinea	6.7	17.0	VII	-	-	-
26	Japan, Hokkaido offshore, 37 km (23 mi) southeast of Nemuro	6.0	86.0	VI	-	-	-
28	Fiji region offshore	6.9	351.8	I	-	-	-
29	Mexico, Colima offshore, 45 km (28 mi) south-southwest of El Naranjo	6.2	10.0	VI	-	-	-

=== May ===
May
- Strongest: 6.7 M_{w} Russia
- Deadliest: 5.6 M_{w} China; 2 deaths
- Total fatalities: 3

Number by magnitude
- 9.0+: 0
- 8.0–8.9: 0
- 7.0–7.9: 0
- 6.0–6.9: 9
- 5.0–5.9: 84
- 4.0–4.9: 639

Date	Country and location	M_{w}	Depth (km)	MMI	Notes	Casualties	
Date	Country and location	M_{w}	Depth (km)	MMI	Notes	Dead	Injured
7	Pacific-Antarctic Ridge	6.2	10.0	-	-	-	-
8	El Salvador, San Vicente, 3 km (1.9 mi) south of San Vicente	5.7	10.0	VIII	One person killed at Conchagua, La Unión. At least 84 homes destroyed, 70 damaged and landslides in the epicentral area.	1	-
9	Solomon Islands, Makira-Ulawa offshore, 76 km (47 mi) west-northewest of Kirakira	6.3	67.9	V	-	-	-
19	Fiji, Eastern offshore, 277 km (172 mi) west-northwest of Haveluloto, Tonga	6.0	386.7	-	-	-	-
20	Mexico, Colima offshore, 33 km (21 mi) southwest of El Colomo	6.3	33.0	VIII	-	-	-
23	China, Sichuan, 119 km (74 mi) northeast of Lijiang	5.5	33.0	VII	One person killed and 39 injured in Yanyuan County, Sichuan. One person killed and 566 others injured, 27 of them serious, in Ninglang Yi Autonomous County, Yunnan. Eleven reservoirs, four power plants and six bridges damaged in the epicentral area.	2	605
25	Russia, Sakhalin offshore, 114 km (71 mi) south-southeast of Kuril’sk	6.7	33.0	VI	-	-	-
25	Indonesia, Special Region of Yogyakarta, 11 km (6.8 mi) northwest of Srandakan	6.3	143.1	V	Several people injured in Surakarta and minor damage in Yogyakarta.	-	Several
26	Fiji region offshore	6.4	406.5	-	-	-	-
28	Indonesia, Maluku offshore, 117 km (73 mi) south-southwest of Tual	6.0	33.0	VI	-	-	-
29	Turkey, Erzurum, 20 km (12 mi) south of Pasinler	4.8	33.0	V	Two people injured and three buildings damaged in the Erzurum area.	-	2
29	Papua New Guinea, Autonomous Region of Bougainville offshore, 92 km (57 mi) south-southwest of Panguna	6.4	14.0	VI	-	-	-

=== June ===
June
- Strongest: 8.4 M_{w} Peru
- Deadliest: 8.4 M_{w} (Peru) Peru; 145 deaths
- Total fatalities: 150

Number by magnitude
- 8.0–8.9: 1
- 7.0–7.9: 1
- 6.0–6.9: 12
- 5.0–5.9: 140
- 4.0–4.9: 726

Date	Country and location	M_{w}	Depth (km)	MMI	Notes	Casualties	
Date	Country and location	M_{w}	Depth (km)	MMI	Notes	Dead	Injured
1	Afghanistan, Parwan, 14 km (8.7 mi) east-northeast of Jabal os Saraj	5.0	62.1	VI	Four people killed, 20 injured and several houses destroyed in Parwan Province.	4	20
3	New Zealand, Kermadec Islands offshore	7.2	178.1	I	-	-	-
5	Papua New Guinea, Morobe, 45 km (28 mi) northwest of Bulolo	6.4	10.0	IX	One person injured, 40 houses damaged or destroyed and landslides occurred in the epicentral area.	-	1
5	Papua New Guinea, Morobe, 49 km (30 mi) north-northwest of Bulolo	6.0	10.0	VIII	Aftershock of the 6.4 event six hours earlier.	-	-
7	China, Yunnan, 147 km (91 mi) southwest of Dali	4.6	33.0	VI	Thirteen people injured and several houses destroyed in Shidian County.	-	13
14	Taiwan, Yilan offshore, 39 km (24 mi) southeast of Yilan	5.9	32.1	VII	Four people injured in Taipei and another in Yilan. Some damage occurred in Taipei and in other parts of northeastern Taiwan.	-	5
14	United States, Alaska offshore, 235 km (146 mi) west-southwest of Adak	6.5	18.0	V	-	-	-
15	Northern Mariana Islands, Pagan region offshore	6.0	33.0	-	-	-	-
15	Yemen, Al Mahrah offshore, 199 km (124 mi) north-northwest of Kilmia	6.0	10.0	-	-	-	-
16	Tonga, Niua offshore, 127 km (79 mi) north-northeast of Hihifo	6.0	10.0	-	-	-	-
19	Chile, Antofagasta, 38 km (24 mi) east-northeast of San Pedro de Atacama	6.0	146.6	V	-	-	-
21	France, Grand Est, 1 km (0.62 mi) east-northeast of Cocheren	4.2	1.0	V	One person killed in a mining incident in Lorraine.	1	-
23	Peru, Arequipa offshore, 6 km (3.7 mi) south-southwest of Atico	8.4	33.0	VIII	Further information: 2001 southern Peru earthquake	145	3,812
23	Peru, Arequipa offshore, 56 km (35 mi) south-southwest of Quilca	6.1	33.0	VII	Aftershock of the 2001 southern Peru earthquake.	-	-
24	Russia, Sakhalin offshore, 125 km (78 mi) south-southeast of Kuril’sk	6.0	33.0	III	-	-	-
25	Turkey, Osmaniye, 17 km (11 mi) south-southeast of Kadirli	5.5	5.0	VII	At least 130 people injured and 66 buildings damaged in Osmaniye Province.	-	130
26	Peru, Arequipa offshore, 34 km (21 mi) west-southwest of Pacocha	6.7	24.0	VIII	Aftershock of the 2001 southern Peru earthquake.	-	-
26	Central East Pacific Rise	6.1	10.0	-	-	-	-
28	Indonesia, West Java, 17 km (11 mi) south-southeast of Majalengka	5.0	36.9	VII	Dozens of people injured, 1,644 structures destroyed and 5,659 structures damaged in Majalengka Regency.	-	Dozens
29	Bolivia, Potosí, 53 km (33 mi) west of Potosí	6.1	273.9	III	-	-	-

=== July ===
July
- Strongest: 7.6 M_{w} Peru
- Deadliest: 4.7 M_{w} (Italy) Italy; 4 deaths
- Total fatalities: 6

Number by magnitude
- 7.0–7.9: 1
- 6.0–6.9: 10
- 5.0–5.9: 102
- 4.0–4.9: 677

Date	Country and location	M_{w}	Depth (km)	MMI	Notes	Casualties	
Date	Country and location	M_{w}	Depth (km)	MMI	Notes	Dead	Injured
1	Papua New Guinea, New Ireland, 76 km (47 mi) east of Kokopo	6.1	28.0	VIII	-	-	-
4	Northern Mariana Islands offshore	6.5	290.0	I	-	-	-
4	Tonga, Tongatapu offshore, 167 km (104 mi) west-southwest of Haveluloto	6.5	184.6	-	-	-	-
4	Bolivia, Cochabamba, 41 km (25 mi) east-northeast of Colomi	6.2	33.0	IX	-	-	-
5	Peru, Arequipa offshore, 31 km (19 mi) south of Achanizo	6.6	62.0	VII	Aftershock of the 2001 southern Peru earthquake. About 300 previously-weakened buildings destroyed in the epicentral area.	-	-
7	Peru, Arequipa offshore, 51 km (32 mi) southwest of Punta de Bombón	7.6	33.0	IX	Aftershock of the 2001 southern Peru earthquake. One person killed and 30 injured in Arequipa. Hundreds of buildings weakened by the previous earthquakes collapsed. A large boulder fell and blocked the Pan-American Highway. Some power outages in the epicentral area and in Arica, Chile.	1	30
8	Papua New Guinea, East New Britain offshore, 250 km (160 mi) east-southeast of Kimbe	6.2	10.0	-	-	-	-
10	Turkey, Erzurum, 16 km (9.9 mi) south-southwest of Pasinler	5.4	33.0	VII	At least 46 people injured and 17 buildings damaged in the Erzurum area.	-	46
14	China, Yunnan, 16 km (9.9 mi) northeast of Yuxi	4.6	33.0	VI	Two people injured, 150 houses and some schools damaged or destroyed in Jiangchuan County.	-	2
16	Nepal, Bagmati, 31 km (19 mi) north-northwest of Kathmandu	5.0	33.0	VII	One person injured and one house collapsed in Dhading District.	-	1
17	Italy, South Tyrol, 3 km (1.9 mi) north-northeast of Rifiano	4.7	10.0	VI	Three people killed by landslides near Gargazon and the Ulten Valley, and one person died of a heart attack at Bolzano. Three people injured and minor damage in the Merano area.	4	3
22	Indonesia, Maluku offshore, 70 km (43 mi) northwest of Tual	6.0	33.0	VII	-	-	-
24	Chile, Tarapacá, 126 km (78 mi) northeast of Iquique	6.4	33.0	IX	One person killed and another injured in Huara; two injured in Chiapa. Power interrupted and water lines broken at Cerro Colorado mine.	1	3
24	Chile, Valparaíso offshore, 19 km (12 mi) north of Viña del Mar	5.4	33.0	VI	Four people injured in Viña del Mar, two in Valparaíso and another in Quintero.	-	7
26	Greece, Central Greece offshore, 32 km (20 mi) west-northwest of Skyros	6.5	10.0	VIII	At least 100 buildings damaged in Skyros, including the Monastery of Saint George. The main water supply system was damaged and falling debris from a castle destroyed 30 cars.	-	-
28	United States, Alaska, 74 km (46 mi) south of Kokhanok	6.6	131.8	VI	-	-	-

=== August ===
August
- Strongest: 7.1 M_{w} New Zealand
- Deadliest: 5.8 M_{w} Peru; 4 deaths
- Total fatalities: 4

Number by magnitude
- 9.0+: 0
- 8.0–8.9: 0
- 7.0–7.9: 1
- 6.0–6.9: 6
- 5.0–5.9: 117
- 4.0–4.9: 739

Date	Country and location	M_{w}	Depth (km)	MMI	Notes	Casualties	
Date	Country and location	M_{w}	Depth (km)	MMI	Notes	Dead	Injured
2	Russia, Kamchatka Krai offshore, 81 km (50 mi) east of Ust’-Kamchatsk Staryy	6.3	14.0	IV	-	-	-
6	Southern East Pacific Rise	6.7	10.0	-	-	-	-
9	Peru, Apurímac, 7 km (4.3 mi) west-southwest of Turpay	5.8	33.0	VIII	Four people killed, 15 seriously injured and 70% of homes destroyed in Antabamba.	4	15
13	Japan, Aomori offshore, 87 km (54 mi) east-northeast of Misawa	6.4	38.0	VI	-	-	-
21	New Zealand, Gisborne offshore, 295 km (183 mi) northeast of Gisborne	7.1	33.0	I	Power outages in northeastern areas of the North Island.	-	-
23	Papua New Guinea, Manus offshore, 182 km (113 mi) southwest of Lorengau	6.2	10.0	-	-	-	-
25	Panama, Chiriquí offshore, 45 km (28 mi) south-southeast of Punta de Burica	6.1	24.5	V	-	-	-
26	Turkey, Düzce, 24 km (15 mi) north of Bolu	5.0	7.8	VII	Aftershock of the 1999 İzmit earthquake. Two people injured in Bolu.	-	2
27	Indonesia, North Maluku offshore, 118 km (73 mi) west-northwest of Ternate	6.1	33.0	IV	Aftershock of the 7.1 event on February 24.	-	-

=== September ===
September
- Strongest: 6.5 M_{w} Indonesia; 6.5 M_{w} Fiji
- Total fatalities: 0

Number by magnitude
- 9.0+: 0
- 8.0–8.9: 0
- 7.0–7.9: 0
- 6.0–6.9: 9
- 5.0–5.9: 77
- 4.0–4.9: 676

Date	Country and location	M_{w}	Depth (km)	MMI	Notes	Casualties	
Date	Country and location	M_{w}	Depth (km)	MMI	Notes	Dead	Injured
2	North Indian Ocean	6.1	10.0	I	-	-	-
2	Pacific-Antarctic Ridge	6.3	10.0	-	-	-	-
11	Indonesia, West Papua, 108 km (67 mi) west-northwest of Manokwari	6.5	33.0	VIII	-	-	-
12	Fiji region offshore	6.5	608.1	-	-	-	-
14	Canada, British Columbia offshore, 211 km (131 mi) west-southwest of Tofino	6.0	10.0	-	-	-	-
15	Tonga, ʻEua offshore, 117 km (73 mi) south of ʻOhonua	6.0	10.0	-	-	-	-
18	Indonesia, Maluku offshore, 138 km (86 mi) northeast of Lospalos, Timor-Leste	6.0	131.8	IV	-	-	-
29	Vanuatu, Shefa offshore, 86 km (53 mi) south of Port Vila	6.4	33.0	V	-	-	-
30	Vanuatu, Shefa offshore, 78 km (48 mi) south-southwest of Port Vila	6.2	33.0	V	Aftershock of the 6.4 event more than a day prior.	-	-

=== October ===
October
- Strongest: 7.5 M_{w} Indonesia
- Deadliest: 5.6 M_{w} China; 1 death
- Total fatalities: 1

Number by magnitude
- 9.0+: 0
- 8.0–8.9: 0
- 7.0–7.9: 3
- 6.0–6.9: 9
- 5.0–5.9: 110
- 4.0–4.9: 710

Date	Country and location	M_{w}	Depth (km)	MMI	Notes	Casualties	
Date	Country and location	M_{w}	Depth (km)	MMI	Notes	Dead	Injured
2	Tonga, Niua offshore, 25 km (16 mi) south of Hihifo	6.2	106.9	-	-	-	-
7	Papua New Guinea, Sandaun offshore, 67 km (42 mi) east-southeast of Aitape	6.2	10.0	VIII	-	-	-
8	Iran, South Khorasan, 99 km (62 mi) east of Bīrjand	4.9	33.0	VII	One person injured and about 200 houses damaged in the epicentral area.	-	1
8	Russia, Kamchatka Krai offshore, 123 km (76 mi) east-southeast of Petropavlovsk-Kamchatsky	6.5	48.5	IV	Doublet earthquake.	-	-
8	Russia, Kamchatka Krai offshore, 114 km (71 mi) east-southeast of Petropavlovsk-Kamchatsky	6.4	33.0	IV	Doublet earthquake.	-	-
12	Canada, British Columbia offshore, 225 km (140 mi) south-southwest of Prince Rupert	6.1	20.0	VI	-	-	-
12	Guam offshore, 69 km (43 mi) south-southeast of Inarajan Village	7.0	37.0	VII	One person injured, many buildings damaged and utilities disrupted in Guam.	-	1
13	Indonesia, North Sulawesi offshore, 129 km (80 mi) east-southeast of Tondano	6.0	33.0	-	-	-	-
17	British Virgin Islands, Anegada offshore, 112 km (70 mi) north of Charlotte Amalie, U.S. Virgin Islands	6.0	33.0	IV	-	-	-
19	Indonesia, Southeast Sulawesi offshore, 155 km (96 mi) east of Kendari	7.5	33.0	VII	-	-	-
21	New Zealand, Gisborne offshore, 178 km (111 mi) east-northeast of Ōpōtiki	6.7	18.0	V	-	-	-
26	Vanuatu, Shefa offshore, 86 km (53 mi) south-southwest of Port Vila	6.1	33.0	V	Aftershock of the 6.4 event of September 29.	-	-
27	China, Yunnan, 74 km (46 mi) southeast of Lijiang	5.6	10.0	VIII	One person killed, 220 injured and 3,400 buildings destroyed in Yongsheng County.	1	220
31	Papua New Guinea, West New Britain, 40 km (25 mi) south of Kimbe	7.0	33.0	VIII	Minor damage in Kimbe.	-	-
31	Turkey, Osmaniye, 14 km (8.7 mi) south-southeast of Kadirli	5.1	10.0	VI	Five people injured and some homes damaged in the Adana-Osmaniye area.	-	5

=== November ===
November
- Strongest: 7.8 M_{w} China
- Total fatalities: 0

Number by magnitude
- 9.0+: 0
- 8.0–8.9: 0
- 7.0–7.9: 1
- 6.0–6.9: 11
- 5.0–5.9: 104
- 4.0–4.9: 675

Date	Country and location	M_{w}	Depth (km)	MMI	Notes	Casualties	
Date	Country and location	M_{w}	Depth (km)	MMI	Notes	Dead	Injured
5	Fiji, Eastern offshore, 174 km (108 mi) east-northeast of Levuka	6.3	564.1	-	-	-	-
9	Panama, Bocas del Toro offshore, 33 km (21 mi) northeast of Changuinola	6.1	10.0	VI	-	-	-
13	Mexico, Sinaloa offshore, 109 km (68 mi) southwest of Barrón	6.1	33.0	-	-	-	-
13	United States, Alaska offshore, 196 km (122 mi) west-northwest of Attu Station	6.0	33.0	-	-	-	-
14	China, Qinghai, 394 km (245 mi) south-southeast of Bingtuan Sanshiliu Tuan	7.8	10.0	X	Further information: 2001 Kunlun earthquake	-	-
15	North of Ascension Island	6.3	10.0	-	-	-	-
20	Indonesia, Maluku offshore, 279 km (173 mi) northeast of Lospalos, Timor-Leste	6.2	33.0	VII	-	-	-
22	Fiji, Western offshore, 145 km (90 mi) west of Labasa	6.3	10.0	V	Doublet earthquake.	-	-
22	Fiji, Western offshore, 141 km (88 mi) west of Labasa	6.2	10.0	VI	Doublet earthquake.	-	-
23	Afghanistan, Badakhshan, 32 km (20 mi) south of Ashkāsham	6.1	106.5	IV	-	-	-
27	New Zealand offshore, south of the Kermadec Islands	6.0	10.0	-	-	-	-
28	Mexico, Chiapas, 2 km (1.2 mi) east-southeast of El Carmen	6.4	84.9	VI	Minor damage in the Tuxtla Gutiérrez area.	-	-

=== December ===
December
- Strongest: 7.1 M_{w} Australia
- Deadliest: 5.8 M_{w} Peru; 2 deaths
- Total fatalities: 2

Number by magnitude
- 9.0+: 0
- 8.0–8.9: 0
- 7.0–7.9: 1
- 6.0–6.9: 11
- 5.0–5.9: 77
- 4.0–4.9: 676

Date	Country and location	M_{w}	Depth (km)	MMI	Notes	Casualties	
Date	Country and location	M_{w}	Depth (km)	MMI	Notes	Dead	Injured
2	Vanuatu, Torba offshore, 158 km (98 mi) northwest of Sola	6.0	100.5	-	-	-	-
2	Japan, Iwate, 3 km (1.9 mi) northwest of Hanamaki	6.5	123.8	V	-	-	-
3	Fiji, Eastern offshore, 249 km (155 mi) south-southeast of Alo, Wallis and Futuna	6.4	10.0	-	-	-	-
4	Peru, Arequipa, 20 km (12 mi) west-southwest of Orcopampa	5.8	33.0	VII	Two people killed in Cayarani District, five injured in Chuquibamba and 30 homes damaged in Condesuyos province.	2	5
8	Japan, Kagoshima offshore, 15 km (9.3 mi) southeast of Naze	6.2	33.0	VIII	-	-	-
9	Indonesia, Gorontalo offshore, 63 km (39 mi) south-southwest of Gorontalo	6.1	156.3	V	-	-	-
12	Vanuatu, Shefa offshore, 87 km (54 mi) northwest of Port Vila	6.1	33.0	VI	-	-	-
12	South of Australia	7.1	10.0	I	-	-	-
18	Japan, Okinawa offshore, 62 km (39 mi) south-southwest of Yonakuni	6.8	14.0	VI	A tsunami was generated with recorded wave heights of 20 cm (0.66 ft) at Iriomote Island, 13 cm (0.43 ft) at Yonaguni and 13 cm (0.43 ft) at Uehara.	-	-
19	Bangladesh, Dhaka, 9 km (5.6 mi) south-southwest of Dhaka	4.5	10.0	VI	At least 100 people injured and some older buildings damaged in the Dhaka area.	-	100
22	Solomon Islands, Temotu offshore, 21 km (13 mi) south-southeast of Lata	6.0	74.2	-	-	-	-
23	Solomon Islands, Guadalcanal offshore, 22 km (14 mi) west-northwest of Malango	6.8	16.0	X	-	-	-
27	Vanuatu, Sanma offshore, 48 km (30 mi) north-northeast of Port Olry	6.2	153.2	IV	-	-	-
28	Peru, Ucayali, 35 km (22 mi) east of San Fernando	6.0	160.6	-	-	-	-
