= January 2001 El Salvador earthquake =

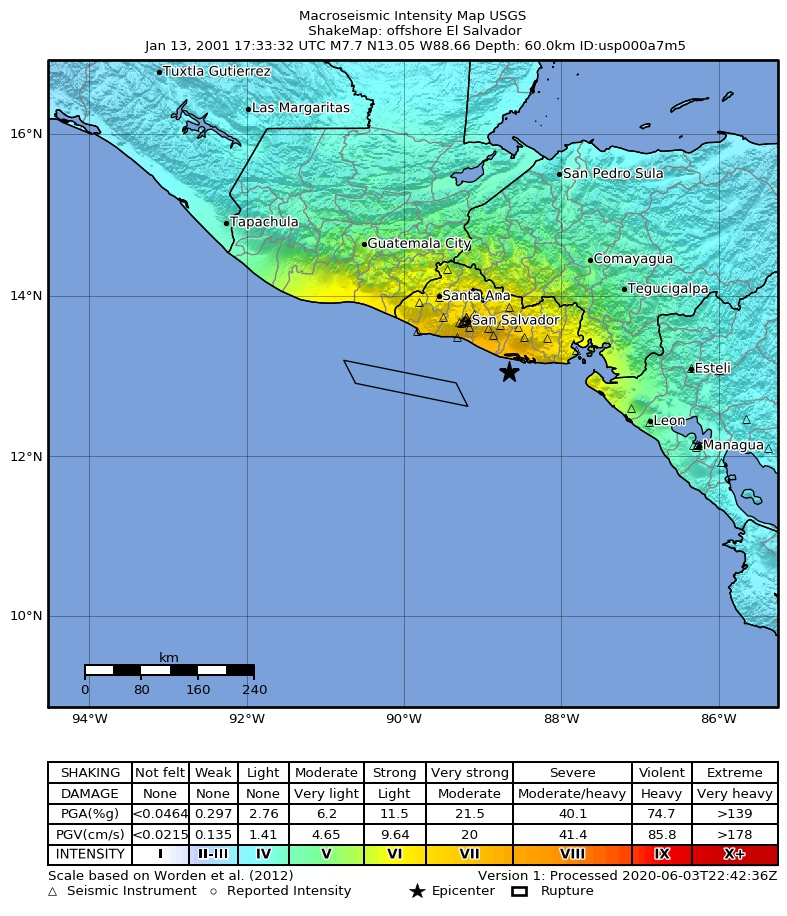
- USGS ShakeMap

- Location within Central America Location within El Salvador
- UTC time: 2001-01-13 17:33:32
- ISC event: 1763440
- USGS-ANSS: ComCat
- Local date: 13 January 2001
- Local time: 11:33:32 CTZ (UTC-6)
- Duration: 20 seconds
- Magnitude: M_{w} 7.7
- Depth: 60 km (37 mi)
- Epicenter: 13.049°N 88.660°W
- Type: Normal
- Areas affected: El Salvador, Guatemala, Nicaragua, Honduras, Costa Rica
- Total damage: US$1.25 billion ($2.22 billion in 2024, adjusted for inflation)
- Max. intensity: MMI VIII (Severe)
- Peak acceleration: 0.82 g
- Landslides: ≥16,000
- Aftershocks: 3,502 ≥M_{w} 2.5 (as of 13 February 2001); Strongest: M_{w} 6.1 on 28 February
- Casualties: 952 fatalities, 5,565 injuries, 193 missing

On 13 January 2001, at 11:33 CTZ (17:33 UTC), a M_{w} 7.7 earthquake struck off the coast of Usulután Department, El Salvador, at a depth of 60 km (37 mi). At least 952 people were killed; 944 in El Salvador and 8 in Guatemala, over 5,500 were injured and nearly 200 were left missing due to the earthquake; every single department in the country reported casualties and severe damage, and damage from the earthquake was reported in five countries throughout Central America.

== Tectonic setting ==
El Salvador lies above the convergent boundary where oceanic crust of the Cocos plate is being subducted beneath the Caribbean plate at rate of about 72 mm per year along the Middle America Trench. This boundary is associated with earthquakes resulting from movement on the plate interface itself, such as the M_{w} 7.7 1992 Nicaragua earthquake, and from faulting within both the overriding Caribbean plate and the subducting Cocos plate, such as the 1982 El Salvador earthquake.

== Earthquake ==
Estimated number of people exposed to shaking levels
MMI	Population exposure
MMI VIII (Severe)	1,252k
MMI VII (Very strong)	5,304k
MMI VI (Strong)	8,365k
MMI V (Moderate)	12,954k

The 13 January earthquake was a result of normal faulting within the subducting Cocos plate as shown by the hypocentral depth and published focal mechanisms. Of the two possible fault planes indicated, analysis of observed seismic waves supports the solution with a fault plane dipping moderately to the northeast. At least 3,502 aftershocks were detected by 13 February, with 108 aftershocks above M_{w} 4.0 recorded by the USGS by the end of July; the largest aftershock was a M_{w} 6.1 event at 18:50 on 28 January.

According to a finite fault model released by the USGS, the earthquake rupture extended over 160 km (100 mi) by 80 km (50 mi), reaching the departments of Usulután, San Vicente, San Vicente, La Libertad, La Paz, Cuscatlán and San Salvador. The zone of the largest slip occurred south-southwest of the hypocenter, where up to 5.4905 m (18.013 ft) of slip was produced. Another zone of slip occurred southeast of Lake Ilopango, producing 1.423 m (4.67 ft) of slip. The entire rupture process took nearly 20 seconds with the greatest phase of seismic moment release occurring about 10 seconds after initiation.

The USGS assigned a maximum intensity of VIII (Severe) for the earthquake, estimating that almost the entirety of El Salvador was exposed to shaking levels exceeding VI (Strong). A USGS seismic installation at La Libertad recorded 0.8188 g in ground acceleration (pga) and 53.2 cm/s (20.9 in/s) in ground velocity. Shaking levels of MMI VI-VII (Strong-Very Strong) were also estimated in parts of Guatemala, Honduras and Nicaragua closest to the epicenter. Shaking was felt as far away as Mexico City and Colombia.

As is often the case after earthquakes in El Salvador, landslides were widespread. The number of slides is difficult to estimate because individual scarps conjoin. The total has been reported as high as 16,000, though it is unclear how this figure was provided.

== Impact ==
At least 944 people were killed, 5,565 others were injured, 193 were missing, 1,364,160 were affected, 108,261 houses collapsed, 169,692 others, 1,155 public buildings, 405 churches, 94 health centers and 43 docks were damaged throughout El Salvador. In La Libertad Department alone, 685 deaths occurred, including 585 from large landslides in Santa Tecla and Comasagua, which buried between 200 and 500 homes. Additionally, there were 48 deaths in Sonsonate, 47 in Santa Ana, 44 in La Paz, 29 in San Vicente, 27 in Usulután, 24 in San Salvador, 20 in Cuscatlán, 19 in San Miguel and 1 in La Unión. Many roads and highways were damaged, cutting off access to several affected areas. In San Salvador, 10,372 homes collapsed and 12,836 suffered damage; additionally, 20 hospitals were damaged, two of them seriously and fires were reported in the city. Several people were killed by the collapse of a church in Santa Ana. Eight people were also killed in Guatemala, where some buildings cracked and power outages occurred. Minor damage was also reported in parts of Honduras, Nicaragua and Costa Rica. The earthquake resulted in about US$1.25 billion worth of damages in El Salvador alone, over half of the country's GDP at the time.

== Aftermath ==
Aftershocks led to additional damage and panic. Clean water and sanitation became a matter of grave concern in many areas due to the earthquake's destruction of some $7 million to municipal drinking water systems, and tens of thousands of people were living outdoors in spite of the approaching rainy season (Invierno). Government and public health organizations warned of the possible spread of disease as desperate people began to scavenge debris piles – some containing severed human limbs – looking for items they could pawn to purchase needed food and other commodities.

In the days and weeks following the earthquakes, Salvadoran and foreign agencies analysed the factors that had facilitated the destruction the disasters had caused. While Salvadoran government representatives were quick to point out that the destruction had been far less than that of the 1986 earthquakes, outside researchers critiqued shortcomings in preparedness and in policies toward land development that had permitted massive deforestation in the Santa Tecla area. Mexican seismologists invited by the Salvadoran government summarized their observations this way:

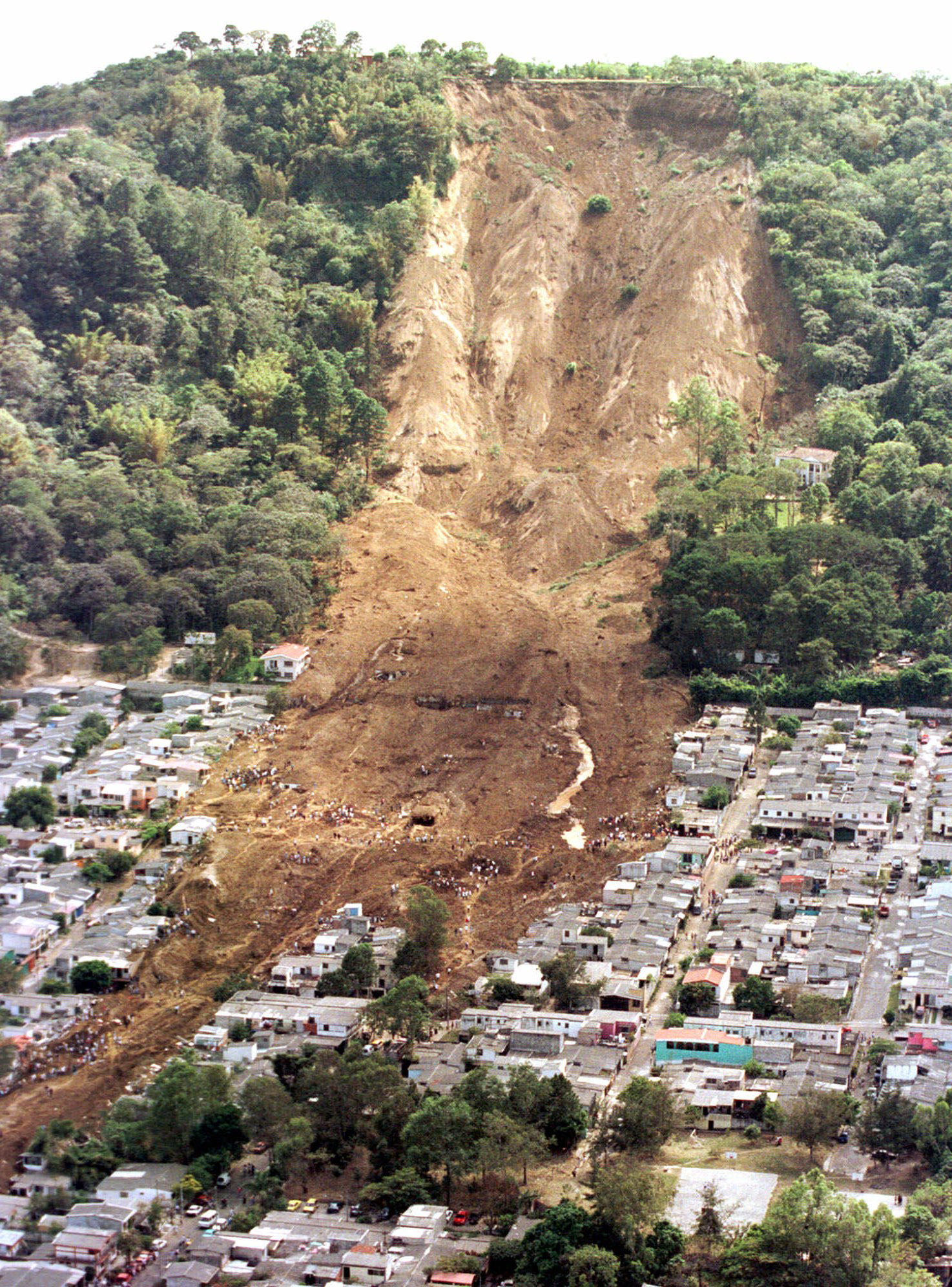
A landslide in the Las Colinas neighborhood of Santa Tecla

The construction equipment of the Ministry of Public Works was thinly stretched over hundreds of earth slumps and seemed inadequate to the task. ... The many homeless were not much in evidence; in the countryside they had been housed in temporary huts under the supervision of the armed forces, or with relatives. No homeless people were seen in the streets of San Salvador, presumably because the middle class had sustained the brunt of the damage. There was a palpable desire in the capital to forget the earthquake drama as quickly as possible.

This may be the wrong time to forget. ... According to some press reports, the developers at Las Colinas had been authorized to proceed in spite of existing zoning regulations designed to prevent residential developments on the slopes. The location was a desirable one because the Santa Tecla area was relatively safe from guerrilla operations. After pacification the pressure from developers subsided as there seems to be plenty of available land in the valley; but there is a definite need for setting up enforceable zoning regulations in order to protect the hillsides from future deforestation and encroachment by developers. ...

The 2001 earthquake did not approach the level of severity of some previous earthquakes, yet it wiped out the equivalent of half the annual gross national income. A small investment in preparedness would pay off handsomely.

— Cinna Lomnitz and Sergio Rodríguez Elizararrás

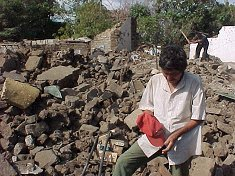
A man walks past the rubble of multiple collapsed homes

The government's response to the earthquakes was critiqued from different sides, with some criticizing the legislature for not approving the full amount of emergency funding urged by President Flores, and others condemning what they saw as the ARENA government's contributions to the devastation. The Nicaragua-based magazine Envío argued that the conservative government's pro-business stance had fostered aggressive levels of land development, coupled with high poverty rates that forced poor rural residents to make do with inadequate but cheap building materials, asserting: "Totaling up these factors makes it clear that the consequences of a natural phenomenon like an earthquake cannot be described as 'natural' ... Describing the January 13 earthquake as a 'natural disaster' is not only irresponsible, but also a declaration of future impotence. It assumes fatalistic acceptance that no natural phenomena can be prevented and that all one can do is respond to emergencies as they arise and try to rehabilitate and reconstruct what has been destroyed." The magazine further critiqued the government's optimism about economic recovery in the aftermath of the first quake as an "insulting" minimization of the tragedy caused across the country and as an attempt to shore up the dollarization campaign that had been the focus of political attention up until the quakes.

Exactly one month after the mainshock there was another destructive earthquake, which occurred on an entirely different fault within the overriding Caribbean plate, leading to a further 315 deaths.

== See also ==
- 1986 San Salvador earthquake
- List of earthquakes in 2001
- List of earthquakes in El Salvador
