= 89th meridian west =

Line of longitude

89th meridian west (interactive map)

The Meridian 89° West of Greenwich is a line of longitude that extends from the North Pole across the Arctic Ocean, North America, the Gulf of Mexico, Central America, the Pacific Ocean, the Southern Ocean, and Antarctica to the South Pole.

The 89th meridian west forms a great ellipse with the 91st meridian east.

== From Pole to Pole ==
Starting at the North Pole and heading south to the South Pole, the 89th meridian west passes through:

Co-ordinates	Country, territory or sea	Notes
90°0′N 89°0′W	Arctic Ocean	
82°0′N 89°0′W	Canada	Nunavut — Ellesmere Island
80°48′N 89°0′W	Nansen Sound	
80°11′N 89°0′W	Canada	Nunavut — Axel Heiberg Island
78°10′N 89°0′W	Norwegian Bay	
76°56′N 89°0′W	Canada	Nunavut — Ellesmere Island
76°24′N 89°0′W	Jones Sound	
75°28′N 89°0′W	Canada	Nunavut — Devon Island
74°47′N 89°0′W	Lancaster Sound	
73°50′N 89°0′W	Prince Regent Inlet	
73°16′N 89°0′W	Canada	Nunavut — Baffin Island
70°40′N 89°0′W	Gulf of Boothia	
69°16′N 89°0′W	Canada	Nunavut — mainland
64°0′N 89°0′W	Hudson Bay	
56°51′N 89°0′W	Canada	Manitoba — for about 1 km Ontario — from 56°50′N 89°0′W
48°30′N 89°0′W	Lake Superior	
48°0′N 89°0′W	United States	Michigan — Isle Royale
47°51′N 89°0′W	Lake Superior	
46°59′N 89°0′W	United States	Michigan; Wisconsin — from 46°6′N 89°0′W; Illinois — from 42°30′N 89°0′W; Kentucky — from 37°13′N 89°0′W; Tennessee — from 36°30′N 89°0′W; Mississippi — from 35°0′N 89°0′W
30°23′N 89°0′W	Gulf of Mexico	Passing through the Chandeleur Islands, Louisiana, United States (at 29°36′N 89°0′W)
29°11′N 89°0′W	United States	Louisiana — Mississippi River Delta
29°10′N 89°0′W	Gulf of Mexico	
21°22′N 89°0′W	Mexico	Yucatán; Quintana Roo — from 35°0′N 89°0′W
17°59′N 89°0′W	Belize	
15°54′N 89°0′W	Guatemala	
15°7′N 89°0′W	Honduras	
14°15′N 89°0′W	El Salvador	Chalatenango — Passing through the districts of Dulce Nombre de María, Santa Rita, Chalatenango, Azacualpa, and San Francisco Lempa. Cuscatlán — passing through the districts of Suchitoto, Tenancingo and San Pedro Perulapán from 13°56′N 89°0′W. La Paz — passing through the districts of San Emigdio, San Miguel Tepezontes, San Juan Tepezontes, San Antonio Masahuat, San Antonio Masahuat, El Rosario and San Luis La Herradura from 13°39′N 89°0′W.
13°20′N 89°0′W	Pacific Ocean	Passing just east of San Cristóbal Island, Galápagos, Ecuador (at 0°43′S 89°14′W)
60°0′S 89°0′W	Southern Ocean	
72°36′S 89°0′W	Antarctica	Territory claimed by Chile (Antártica Chilena Province)

Next westward: 90th meridian west	89th meridian west forms a great circle with 91st meridian east	Next eastward: 88th meridian west

== See also ==
- 88th meridian west
- 90th meridian west
