= El Carmen, El Salvador =

El Carmen, El Salvador may refer to:

- El Carmen, Cuscatlán, a municipality in the Cuscatlán department of El Salvador
- El Carmen, La Unión, a municipality in the La Unión department of El Salvador
