= Anamorós =

- Municipality
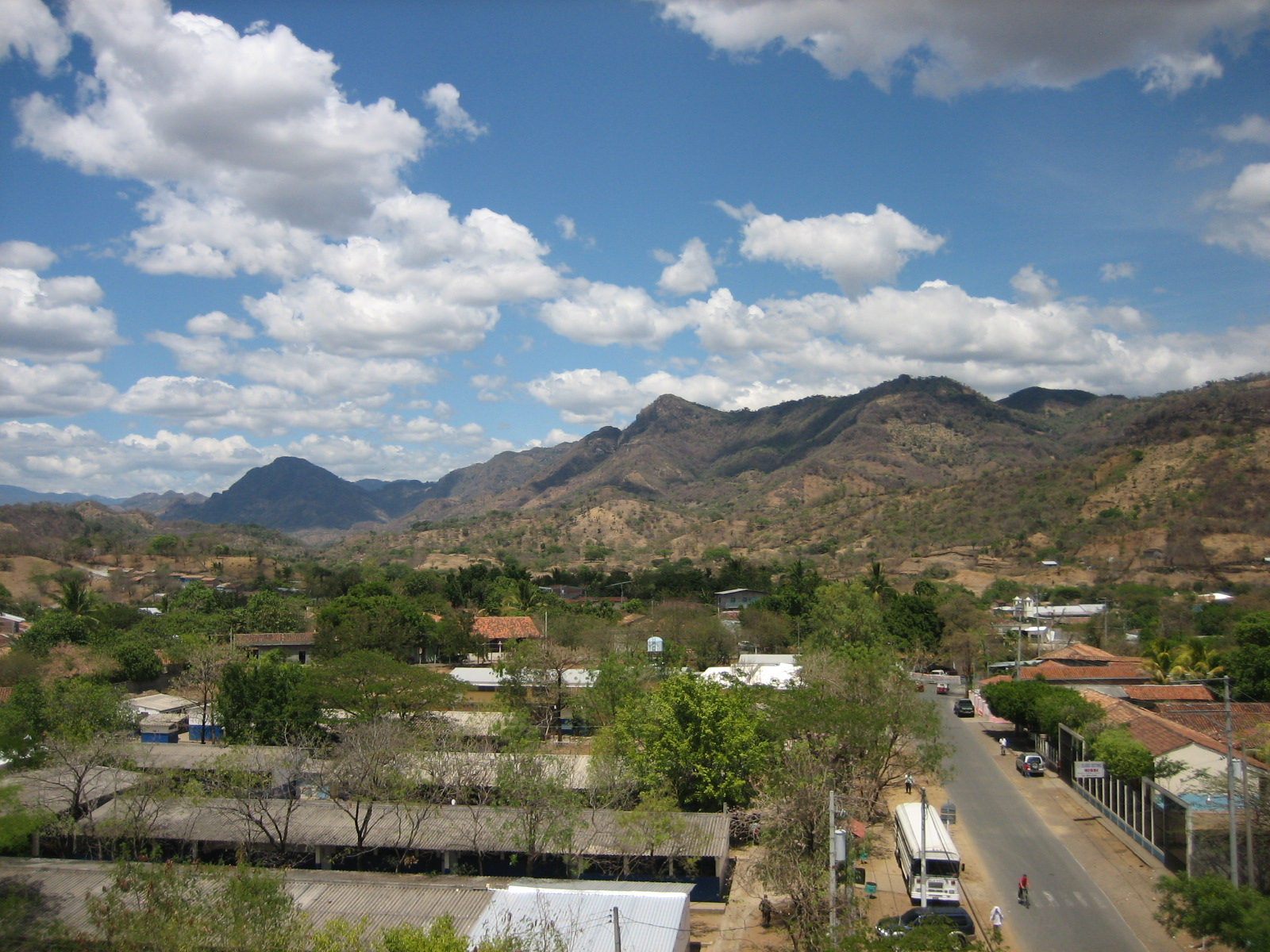

- Location in El Salvador
- Coordinates: 13°44′N 87°52′W
- Country: El Salvador
- Department: La Unión Department

Government
  - Mayor: José Alfredo Benítez (Nuevas Ideas)

Area
  - Total: 42 sq mi (108 km^{2})
- Elevation: 545 ft (166 m)

Population (2006)
  - Total: 16,594

Anamorós is a municipality in the La Unión department of El Salvador.

The associated Catholic parish was the first post of future archbishop and martyr Óscar Romero.

== History ==
The name of Anamorós is believed to come from the Lenca language meaning Maizal (Corn field). However there are other possible interpretations.

It is unknown when the village of Anamorós was first founded. There are some recorded documents suggesting that it may be between 1574 and 1689. With the name and its location in the middle of Lenca former territory, there is no doubt the Lenca people were in Anamorós before the Spanish, but Jorge Larde y Larin (from El Salvador´s Ministry of Culture) claims it was not really a village or town prior to Spanish Conquest, saying such a thing was not mentioned in the ancient chronicles.

=== Brief Timeline ===
==== During El Salvador's Colonial Era (1528–1811) ====
- In 1530, the Spanish founded the city of San Miguel to begin conquering the Lenca people in the eastern half of present-day El Salvador.
- In 1536, San Miguel was destroyed by one of the largest organized resistances of indigenous people of Latin America, led by Lenca ruler, Lempira. His influence was spread all over the majority of Honduras and the Lenca (Potones) of Eastern El Salvador which would have included Anamorós. The Spanish soon retaliated and defeated the resistance.
- In 1737 the lands of Anamorós were measured and divided by the government.
- In 1740, there was a population of 28 of which no Catholic Church was founded yet.
- In 1770, Anamorós was a village in the parish of Gotera, with 170 inhabitants and 72 families (found in the census data collected by the Archbishop Pedro Cortes y Larraz).
- In 1786, Anamorós joined the Gotera district.
- In 1807, it was head of the parish Anamorós, with the villages of Polorós and Lislique as annexes.

==== After the United Provinces of Central America dissolved (1840) ====
- In 1871, it obtained the title of town
- In 1972, Anamorós finally gained the title of city as "Ciudad de Anamorós."

=== Civil War (1979–1992) ===
Between January 1980 and July 1991, El Salvador was in a civil war, fought between the U.S.-backed Salvadoran government and the FMLN front guerrillas. During this time many guerrilleros from the FMLN movement and soldiers from the government would be guilty of violence and human rights violations (the militant government, so far, is known to be guilty of far more than half of it).

Specifically, in Anamorós: In November 1983, 135 Salvadoran soldiers surrendered to the FMLN. That same month, the prisoners of war were later released to the ICRC. In the middle of the road, a fourteen-year-old was hurt by an FMLN mine sometime in August 1985. A well-known photojournalist, Scott Wallace, has passed through the area of Anamorós and documented his experience.

=== Post-War and Gang Violence (1993–2019) ===
El Salvador post war era was marked with a rejuvenation of democracy and government reformation, but it also paved way for organized crime. The ruling parties (that were once the civil war factions) were unable to deal with the gangs terrorizing inside and outside the country. Anamorós was no exception from being a victim (or target) of gang activity.

=== Nuevas Ideas (2019–present) ===
The country of El Salvador has seen the largest positive change since Nayib Bukele have become President of El Salvador. His new party, Nuevas Ideas "New Ideas", was the first one to come into power since the political domination of the two post war parties FMLN and ARENA. Following a sudden increase in gang violence in March 2022, Bukele and the Legislative Assembly declared a one-month emergency regime, suspending constitutional rights and relaxing the rules for making arrests. Since then, as part of a ruthless anti-gang campaign, security forces have arrested more than 77,000 people. In November 2023, the government captured a gang leader who attempted to flee to Anamorós.

Now the city of Anamorós enjoys a time of relative peace and economic improvement. Real estate development is expected to increase by 70%. Tourism has increased, and now the city awaits the announced project of a new airport in the department of La Unión, whereas before the nearest international airports were in San Salvador (the only one in El Salvador, but on the opposite side of the country), or Tegucigalpa, Honduras (technically closer to Anamorós but in a different country).

== Name Origin ==
The name of Anamorós comes from the Lenca language of Potón. It has three possible meanings:

- Corn field (or a place where corn can be found) in Spanish: "Maizal" Anam = corn, Oro, Oros = locative suffix
- Eaters of Zapote Amo = Zapote, Ros = to eat
- Place of lizards (or geckos) Anam = lizard, Oro, Oros = locative suffix

== Culture ==
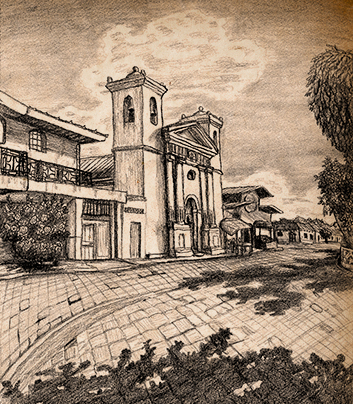
Drawing of the Catholic Church Paish: Nuestra Señora Virgen de la Asunción

=== Church ===
Like most towns established or organized by the Spanish, Anamorós has a Catholic Church in the main town square named: Iglesia Católica Parroquia Nuestra Señora Virgen de la Asunción. This is Oscar Romero's first appointed parish location.

=== Festivities ===
The Fiestas Patronales (patron saint festivities) of Anamorós are celebrated from the 10th to 16 August in honor of the Virgin of Asunción.

=== Legends ===
One famous legend involves one of the geological features prominent in Anamorós.

The Legend goes: Many years ago, in a place inhabited by Indians, the chief of Cedros and the Indians of Anamorós were at odds. The chief of Cedros, transforming into a large snake, attempted to destroy Anamorós. However, an Indian from Anamorós, aware of this threat, built a hill of stones to locate the snake. When the snake passed under the hill, the Anamorós Indian killed it with a poisoned arrow, dividing his body in two. The head formed a deep pool known as the “Poza Bruja" (accursed pool) and the tail formed another pool called the “Medina pool.” The hill was left in the shape of a snake, known as “Cerro de la Culebra”, and the stone hill built by the Anamorós Indian remained as a monument to his defense against the enemy.

== Administration ==
The municipality is divided into 8 cantons (a rural administrative division) and 84 hamlets, which are:

- Agua Blanca
- Cordoncillo
- El Carbonal
- El Cedro
- El Tizate
- Huertas Viejas
- Terreritos
- Tulima
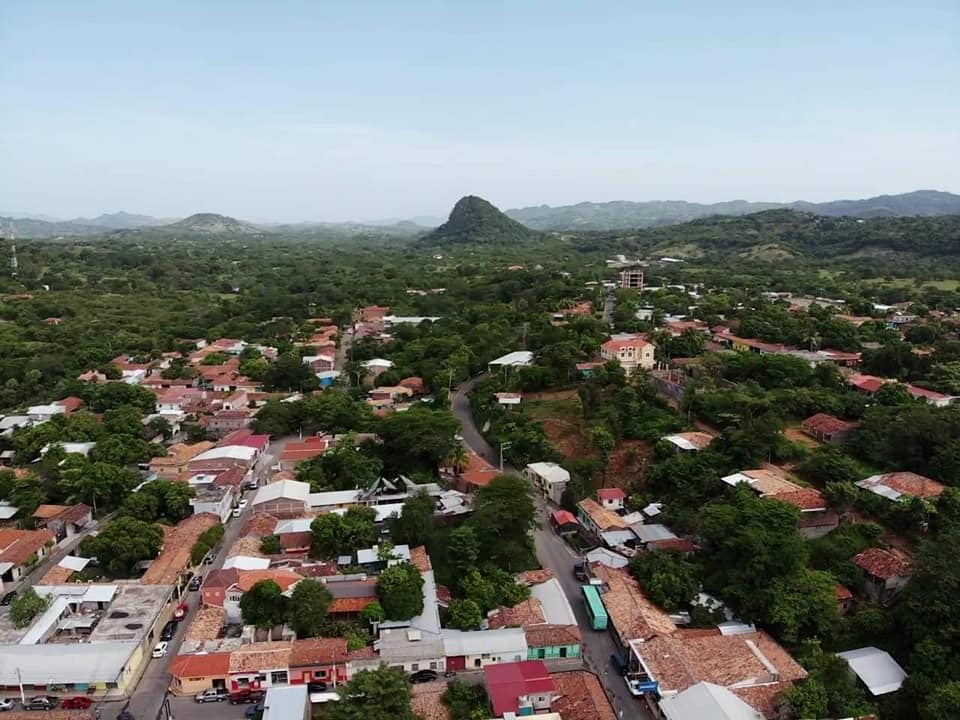

== Industry, Commerce and Communications ==
The industry in the city is varied. There are clay derivative factories, concentrate factories, welding workshops, among others.

There is the production of panela candy, dairy products, hammocks, cast nets, comales and clay pots. There are also pharmacies, hardware stores, agricultural services, stores and other small businesses.

The city of Anamorós's paved roads are connected with the city of Santa Rosa de Lima, with the city of Nueva Esparta, with Lislique and with El Sauce.

Anamorós is the headquarters of the company Anamorós Televisión S.A. of C.V. (owner of the cable television system and residential internet through fiber optics.) It has a network that covers the municipalities of Anamorós, Lislique, Nueva Esparta, El Sauce, Polorós, Pasaquina, Santa Rosa de Lima and some areas of Concepción de Oriente.

There are 2 local channels transmitted by cable: ATV Channel 17 "the signal that is seen" (property of Anamorós Televisión S.A. of C.V.) and TVC La Asunción Channel 68 (property of the Nuestra Señora Virgen de la Asunción Parish Catholic Church.)

== Sports ==
The local football club is named C.D. SAN CARLOS and it currently plays in the Salvadoran THIRD Division.
