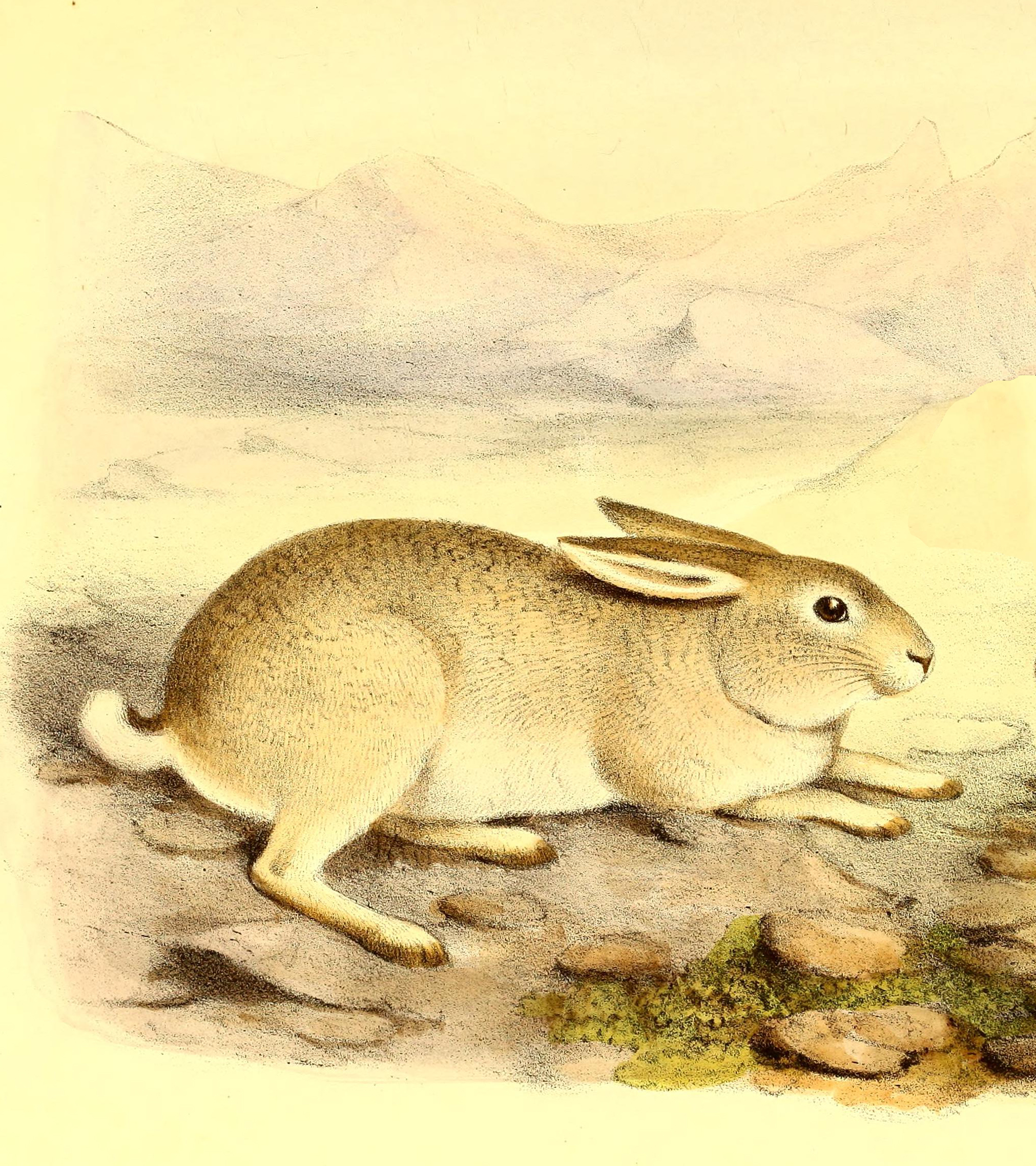
- Drawing, circa 1879

Conservation status
- Near Threatened (IUCN 3.1)

Scientific classification
- Kingdom: Animalia
- Phylum: Chordata
- Class: Mammalia
- Order: Lagomorpha
- Family: Leporidae
- Genus: Lepus
- Species: L. yarkandensis

Binomial name
- Lepus yarkandensis Günther, 1875
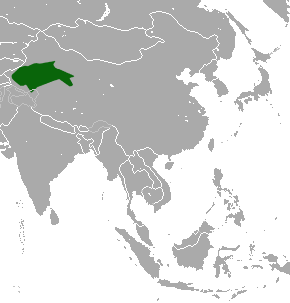
- Yarkand hare range

= Yarkand hare =

Species of mammal

The Yarkand hare (Lepus yarkandensis) is a species of mammal in the family Leporidae. It has soft, straight, sandy brown dorsal pelage which has grayish-black stripes, and completely white ventral pelage. Endemic to China, the Yarkand hare is restricted to the Tarim Basin in Southern Xinjiang, China. It is mainly nocturnal, and forages on grass and crops. The female produces two or three litters annually, each consisting of two to five young. It is rated as near threatened on the International Union for Conservation of Nature Red List of Endangered Species and by the Red List of China's Vertebrates. However, Chinese geneticists have stated the species is "endangered" due to limited habitat and its fragmentation, and over-hunting and poaching.

== Taxonomy ==
In 1875, the German zoologist Albert Karl Ludwig Gotthilf Günther first described the Yarkand hare, giving it the name Lepus yarkandensis, in the Annals and Magazine of Natural History. Gureev in 1964 and also by Averianov in 1998 placed the species in the subgenus Tarimolagus. It has no recognized subspecies. Low gene flow and genetic subdivision occurs among isolated populations of the Tarim Basin. The analysis of mitochondrial D-loop sequence has shown that significant genetic divergence was observed among some populations, but not much genetic divergence was observed among other populations. In the populations inhabiting the southern periphery of the Taklamakan Desert, a lower level of genetic diversity was found. It is thought that the pattern of lineage mixing shown by the mitochondrial Cytochrome b DNA data could be due to the extensive gene flow among the Yarkand hare populations. It could be explained by the probable demographic expansion of the species during the late Pleistocene interglacial period. The eastern and northern distribution ranges may have undergone three postglacial colonizations.

== Description ==
It is a small hare, measuring 285 to 430 mm (11.2 to 16.9 in) in length, and weighs 1.1 to 1.9 kg (2.4 to 4.2 lb). The skull is small, measuring 76 to 88 mm (3.0 to 3.5 in) in length. It has narrow nasal cavities with their back portions being straight and flat. The supraorbital process is low and flat, or are slightly curved upward. The auditory bullae are round and tall, and the palatal bridge is narrow. It has soft, straight, sandy brown dorsal pelage which has grayish black stripes, and completely white ventral pelage. It has long ears, measuring 90 to 110 mm (3.5 to 4.3 in) in length, which lacks black at the tips. The winter pelage is lighter in tone, and is light sandy brown above. The underparts are white. The tail is 55 to 86 mm (2.2 to 3.4 in) long, and is smoke gray in colour, having whitish or creamy yellowish white below and along the sides. The upper incisors are filled with cement, and have V-shaped grooves. The forefeet are very pale and are brown at the front, and the hindfeet are paler, brown at the front too, and measure 90 to 110 mm (3.5 to 4.3 in) in length.

It is distinguished from the desert hare (Lepus tibetanus), by its lack of black near the tip the peripheries of the ears. It is also distinguished from the Lepus oiostolus pallipes, by its lack of grey at the rump. It is also smaller in size and has thinner legs, than both the desert hare and the Lepus oiostolus pallipes.

The species is easily distinguishable from other Chinese hares, having longer ears than the Chinese hare (Lepus sinensis). Like the woolly hare (Lepus oiostolus) and the Chinese hare, an examination of the skull shows the groove on the front face of the upper incisors is filled with cement.

== Distribution and habitat ==
Endemic to China, the Yarkand hare is restricted to the Tarim Basin in Southern Xinjiang, China. Its complete distribution, according to Angermann, falls in between 36° N and 42° N latitudes, and 76° E and 92° E longitudes.

It prefers basins and desert areas vegetated with Chinese tamarisk (Tamarix chinensis), brush, or poplar (Populus), along the peripheries of rivers that surround the mountains in the Taklamakan Desert. This distribution of the Yarkand hare is ring shaped. It also uses reed vegetation along rivers for shelter, and tends to avoid agricultural fields. About 200,000 individuals are estimated to inhabit the Tarim Basin.

However, in 2010 Y.H. Wu of the Chinese Academy of Sciences flatly writes that the species is "endangered" due primarily to its fragmented and isolated islands of population. As Professor Wu wrote:

The Yarkand hare is an endangered species. ... [It] is distributed in scattered oases which are physically isolated by desert.

Thus, its "natural fragmented habitat makes it an ideal object for study effect of habitat fragmentation on its genetic structure."

== Behavior and ecology ==
It is a mainly nocturnal species, generally out in early morning or late evening, but may also feed at night. It hides in depressions, under vegetation, during the day. Foraging on grass and crops, the hare uses traditional foraging routes which can be 1 to 2 km (0.62 to 1.24 mi) long. Breeding season begins in February and can be seven to eight months long, extending up to September. The female produces two or three litters annually, each consisting of two to five young. Although there is no information on its home range, a high population density was previously inferred. In 1983, Gao recorded that in three hours observing in the field, four people could find 20 or more Yarkand hares.

Their main predator is the eagle.

== Status and conservation ==
Since 1996, it has been rated as a near threatened species on the IUCN Red List of Endangered Species. This is because it has a restricted area of occupancy; although it is a widespread species and has been reported as commonly found within its distribution. Additionally, its population trends, declining about 30%, warrants it a near threatened status, nearly meeting the criteria to be rated as vulnerable. It is hunted as a game species and, between 1958 and 1981, annually about 10,000 furs were produced from the Yarkand hare. Human activities such as transportation development and petroleum exploration has led to the population decline of the species. The Red List of China's Vertebrates has listed it as near threatened, and earlier it had been regionally listed as vulnerable. It occurs in the Aerjinshan, Luobupoyeluotuo, and Talimuhuyanglin Nature Reserves. As the IUCN report notes:

However, increased human activity within its range is undoubtedly impacting this species negatively. At present, there are no data available to quantify ongoing population decline. It is assumed that declines are moderate (approximately 30%) and is, therefore, listed as Near Threatened nearly qualifying for listing as Vulnerable (VU) under A2cd. The species occurs only in the widely spaced oases that surround the Tarim – making it highly fragmented; the majority of the desert has no water or vegetation. More data are needed on the actual population level of L. yarkandensis in the oases that define its AOO, as well as whether or not the species is currently poached for food or pelts.

Although it was regionally "classified as VU under criteria A1cd (Wang and Xie 2004)" a better criterion A2 was preferred, "as the cause(s) of decline have not ceased and are expected to continue in the future."

The synergy of habitat loss, habitat patchiness and unsustainable harvest are cause for conservation concern. As indicated previously, Chinese researchers think it is "endangered."
