= Nueva Esparta (disambiguation) =

Nueva Esparta (Spanish for "New Sparta") may refer to:

- Nueva Esparta, one of the States of Venezuela
- Nueva Esparta, El Salvador, a municipality in El Salvador
- Nueva Esparta class destroyer, a class of destroyers of the Venezuelan navy
- ARV Nueva Esparta (D-11), a ship of Nueva Esparta class
