= 91st meridian =

91st meridian may refer to:

- 91st meridian east, a line of longitude east of the Greenwich Meridian
- 91st meridian west, a line of longitude west of the Greenwich Meridian

91st meridian west	91st meridian east

- 91st Meridian, an electronic publication of the International Writing Program at the University of Iowa
