= Nueva Esparta, El Salvador =

Nueva Esparta
- Municipality
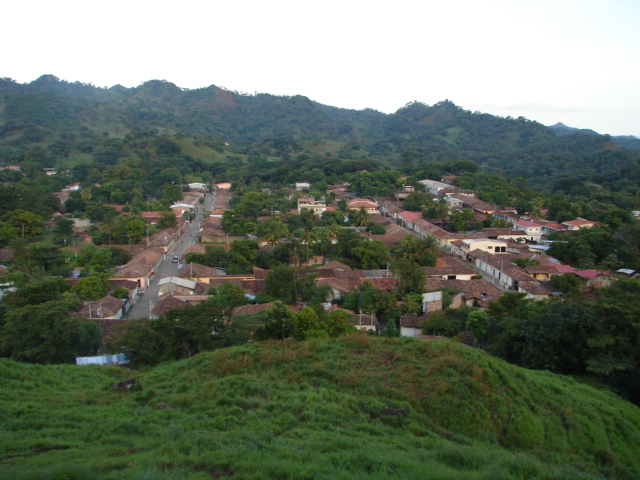
- View of Town from La Peñona

- Location in El Salvador
- Coordinates: 13°47′N 87°50′W
- Country: El Salvador
- Department: La Unión
- Established: 1838
- Town: 1865
- City: 1966

Government
  - Type: Mayor-Council
  - Mayor: Manrique Villatoro

Area
  - Municipality: 86 km^{2} (33 sq mi)
  - Urban: 0.76 km^{2} (0.29 sq mi)
- Elevation: 225 m (738 ft)

Population (2006)
  - Municipality: 2,200
  - Density: 25.5/km^{2} (66/sq mi)
- Time zone: CST
- Website: http://www.miesparta.com/

Nueva Esparta is a district in La Unión Department, in the northeasternmost zone of El Salvador. The district is politically divided into the central Pueblo Nueva Esparta, six outlying canton communities and 31 caserios (smaller community outgrowths from the pueblo or canton communities).

== Geography ==
=== Location ===
To the north of the district lies the border with Honduras and the district of Polorós; to the east, Polorós and Concepción del Oriente; to the south, Anamorós and El Sauce; to the west, Lislique and Anamorós. The city is 200 km (120 mi) from San Salvador, located north of the Ruta Militar highway along a rural road.

Geographic Coordinates: 13 degrees 54’ 00” LN (North), 13 degrees 42’ 35” LN (South), 87 degrees 47’ 48” LN (East), and 87 degrees 53’ 36” LN (West).

Altitude (city center): 295 meters (968 ft) above sea level (at the center of the town), although some areas around the town reach over 850 meters (2,790 ft) above sea level.

Territorial Extension: 86 km^{2} (33 sq mi), of which 0.72 km^{2} (0.28 sq mi) is urban and 85.44 km^{2} (32.99 sq mi) is rural.

=== Climate ===
Climate varies widely across the district. The town lies in a valley and thus experiences the district's warmest temperatures; more altitudinous canton communities such as Las Marias and Monteca experience more moderate, at times even chilly, temperatures. Like all of El Salvador, Nueva Esparta experiences a dry season during summer (November through April) and a rainy season during winter (late April through early October), with official annual precipitation estimated between 1,600 and 1,800 millimetres (63 and 71 in).

=== Cantons ===
El Portillo, Honduritas, El Banadero, Las Mariás, Monteca, Ocotillo, Talpetate.

== History ==
Nueva Esparta was founded on 15 December 1838, by Colombian Colonel Narciso Benítez, a leader in the Republican Army of Liberator Simón Bolívar. The original population consisted of Honduran immigrants who had ably fought beside General Francisco Morazán's troops—they battled so courageously that Francisco Morazán called the Honduran soldiers ¨my valiant Spartans¨ (an homage to the renowned warriors of Ancient Greek city-state Sparta, who fought back Persian aggressors with only 300 troops). Thus the city came to be known as Nueva Esparta, or “New Sparta.”

The original Honduran immigrant population eventually returned to their home country, and the city soon became settled by families who had arrived from Spain.

On December 15, 1841, The Legislative Assembly of El Salvador granted Nueva Esparta the title of “Pueblo,” belonging to the district of San Antonio El Sauce, San Miguel. June 22, 1865, the pueblo was annexed into the Department of La Unión. February 9, 1883, Nueva Esparta came to form part of the district of Santa Rosa de Lima. March 10, 1892, under the administration of General Carlos Ezeta, Nueva Esparta was declared a “Village” (Villa). March 29, 1966, President Coronel Julio Adalberto Rivera granted Nueva Esparta the title of “City.”

== Politics ==
Nationally, there are two main political parties in El Salvador with roots in the Civil War. The main right-wing party is La Alianza Republicana Nacionalista (Nactionalist Republican Alliance—ARENA), founded on September 30, 1981, retained strong links to the military during the Civil War and have held power for the later years of the war and most of the post-war period. The Farabundo Martí National Liberation Front (FMLN) the socialist party, is the direct descendant of the communist guerrilla troops that fought against the Salvadoran government, and was legally constituted as a political party on September 1, 1992. Since the Civil War the two have remained the country's principal political parties, still divided by the left-right binary.

The La Unión department of El Salvador has traditionally leaned heavily conservative; indeed, not a single Municipal Government in La Unión is controlled by an FMLN mayor. Likewise, in Nueva Esparta, the local political competition is generally only between parties generally associated with the right: the aforementioned ARENA, PNC (Party of National Conciliation) and PDC (Party of Democratic Christians).

Nueva Esparta has been governed since 2000 by the ARENA party administration of Jose Manrique Villatoro.

== Population and industry ==
The lineage of European Colonizers in El Salvador's Northeastern region is physically apparent among Nueva Espartanos. The district has its share of “cheles”—fair skinned, often blue or green eyed, occasionally blond or red haired Salvadorans who could easily be mistaken for White Americans.

A large proportion of Nueva Esparta's residents live in, have lived in, or have family living in the United States. Many residents’ incomes are supplemented by money earned in the U.S. and sent to family in El Salvador through remittances. As a result, many newly built or renovated homes dot the landscape.

Although staple crops such as corn and beans are grown on individuals’ milpas, much of the land and local industry is dedicated to cattle farming. The ever-present cows also allow Nueva Esparta to produce many cheeses known in El Salvador — crema, cuajada, requeson, y quesos are produced daily in a number of homes.

== Culture ==
Like most of El Salvador, Nueva Esparta has been traditionally Catholic. However, Evangelicalism first appeared in Nueva Esparta in the 1960s and has been gaining popularity ever since. The pueblo's single colonial Catholic Church is now accompanied by a number of Evangelical churches and temples.

Despite non-unanimous adherence to traditional Catholicism, Catholic patron-saint and other religious festivals remain culturally important. Nueva Esparta celebrates its Fiestas Patronales June 26 through 29 in honor of the city's patron Saint Peter (Santo Patrón de Pedro), and its more popular Fiestas Titulares December 11 through 15 in honor of the Virgin of the Conception (la Virgen de Concepción). The celebrations are marked by dances, parties, fairs, soccer tournaments, and other events.

Nueva Espartans are often called "Mahonchos", referring to the short, square bananas prominently grown across the municipio.

Schools: The pueblo has a kindergarten (Escuela de Educación Parvularia), a primary school (Centro Escolar José Simeon Cañas), and a high school (El Instituto Nacional de Nueva Esparta, or INNE).
