= 2001 southern Peru earthquake =

2001 severe earthquake centered in Arequipa Region, Peru

2001 Southern Peru earthquake
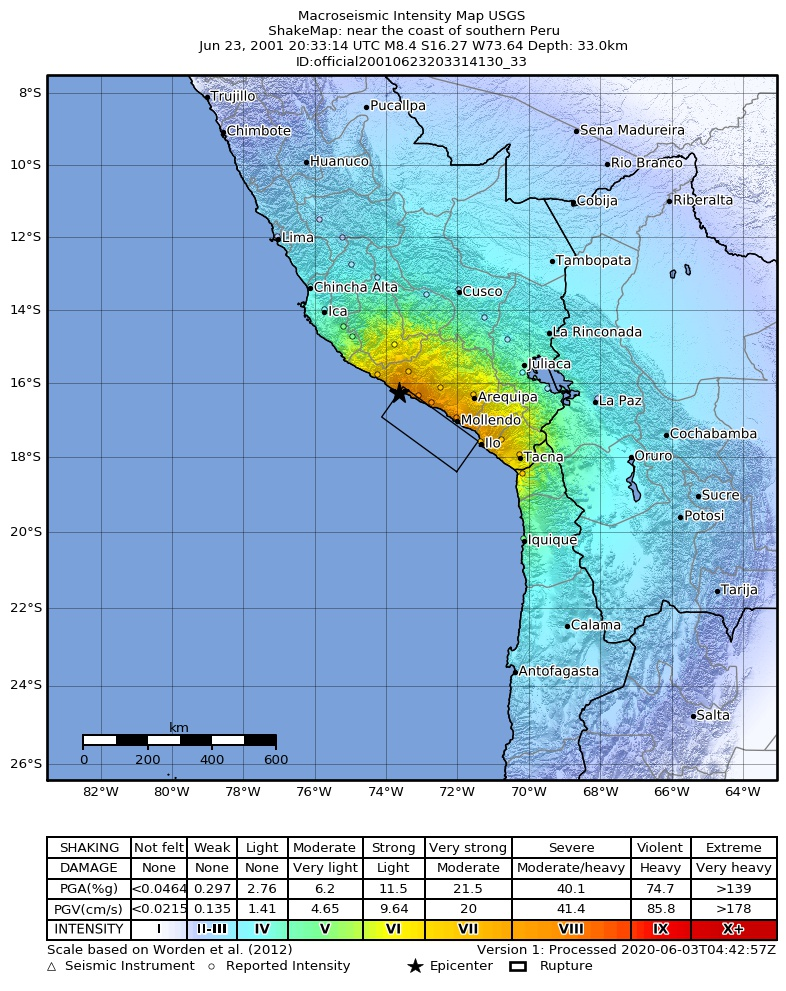
- USGS ShakeMap
- UTC time: 2001-06-23 20:33:14
- ISC event: 1893467
- USGS-ANSS: ComCat
- Local date: June 23, 2001
- Local time: 15:33
- Magnitude: M_{w} 8.4
- Depth: 32 km (20 mi)
- Epicenter: 16.36°S 73.48°W
- Type: Megathrust
- Areas affected: Peru
- Max. intensity: MMI VIII (Severe)
- Tsunami: 8 m (26 ft)
- Casualties: 74–145 dead 3,812 injured

The 2001 southern Peru earthquake occurred at 20:33:15 UTC (15:33:15 local time) on June 23 with a moment magnitude of 8.4 and a maximum Mercalli intensity of VIII (Severe). The quake affected the Peruvian regions of Arequipa, Moquegua and Tacna. It was the most devastating earthquake in Peru since the catastrophic 1970 Ancash earthquake and globally the largest earthquake since the 1965 Rat Islands earthquake.

== Tectonic setting ==
Peru lies above the destructive boundary where the Nazca plate is being subducted beneath the South American plate along the line of the Peru–Chile Trench. The two plates are converging towards each other at a rate of about 78mm or 3 inches per year. Southwestern Peru has a history of very large earthquakes. The June 23 shock originated just southeast of the source of a magnitude 7.7 earthquake that occurred in 1996, and it appears to have involved rupture of part of the plate boundary segment that produced an earthquake of magnitude approximately 9.0 in 1868. The 1868 earthquake was destructive in towns that were heavily damaged in the June 23 earthquake. The 1868 earthquake produced a tsunami that killed thousands of people along the South American coast and also caused damage in Hawaii and the only recorded tsunami deaths in New Zealand.

== Earthquake ==
The earthquake occurred as a result of thrust faulting along the plate boundary interface. The initial onset consisted of two events separated by about 6 seconds. It was followed by at least one larger complex event occurring about 40 seconds later. The rupture area as determined from the distribution of aftershocks was 320 km x 100 km. The rupture propagated unilaterally from the hypocenter towards the southeast. The earthquake resulting in many instances of ground failure effects. These ground failure effects included landslides, collapsed drainage banks, ground cracking and more. These failures can have long term effects on the landscape and the local habitats. A maximum Modified Mercalli intensity of VIII (Severe) was recorded in the Arequipa-Camaná-Tacna area, while VII (Very Strong) was observed in Arica, Chile, where shaking was also felt in the cities Iquique, Calama and Tocopilla, Chile. The earthquake was also felt in Bolivia.

== Tsunami ==
The size and location of the earthquake caused a local tsunami in Peru as well as smaller tsunamis in other countries and on other continents. The magnitude of the local tsunami that was caused by the earthquake was measured as Mt=8.2 by the Earthquake Research Institute and waves from the local tsunami were recorded to be 5 to 8 meters high. Tsunami runup heights near Camana were estimated from field evidence to have reached approximately 7 m (23 ft) at some locations; at other locations, the tsunami inundation distance extended more than 1 km inland from the coast. Tsunami wave heights (peak-to-trough) recorded from selected tide stations: 2.5 m (8.2 ft) at Arica; 1.5 m (4.9 ft) at Iquique; 1.0 m (3.3 ft) at Coquimbo, Chile. Other areas that also recorded tsunamis associated with the earthquake include the Galapagos Islands, Mexico, California, Hawaii, Alaska, Fiji, Samoan Islands, Japan, New Zealand, Tonga, and Russia.

== Damage and casualties ==
Casualties by department
Department	Deaths	Injuries	Destroyed buildings	Damaged buildings
Arequipa	34	1,991	8,635	13,622
Ayacucho	5	73	1,359	-
Moquegua	24	277	9,974	4,062
Tacna	14	372	5,431	15,886

At least 74 people were killed, 3,812 others were injured, 22,052 homes were destroyed and 33,570 homes damaged by the earthquake and tsunami, mostly in the Arequipa-Camana-Tacna area. Landslides blocked highways in the epicentral area. In Arequipa, up to 70% of buildings were damaged, including many historic buildings such as the left tower of the Basilica Cathedral of Arequipa. Around 80% of buildings were also damaged in Moquegua. In Arica, Chile, 30 people were injured, four of them seriously, and buildings were damaged.

The resulting tsunami destroyed over 2,000 buildings, killed 26 people and left 64 others missing in the Camaná-Chala area. It caused severe damage to a 20 km section of coastline in Camana and as a result over 3,000 structures were destroyed or damaged, around 5,000 acres of farmland were covered in sand. Although great damage occurred to structures in the area, the loss of human life could have been much greater had this event occurred in the summer when the area is highly populated by tourists. Another factor that greatly reduced the loss of life was that a majority of the population is knowledgeable about earthquakes and their resulting tsunamis. Many of the residents who felt the earthquake and noticed the receding water evacuated to higher ground to avoid the tsunami.

== Response ==
The Government of Peru and the National Institute of Civil Defence (INDECI) were at the center of relief efforts after the earthquake and tsunami. At least 36,000 homes were damaged with another minimum of 24,000 homes destroyed. This was particularly concerning due to the weather being able to go below freezing temperatures in some of the areas. After a state of emergency was declared in some affected areas on 24 June, International assistance was requested by the Government of Peru and a total of $215 million was allocated with $70 million going to relief and $140 million going to reconstruction. Most of the funds were gotten from loans and were split between the different ministries of Government to provide aid and relief efforts. Multilateral Organizations including UNICEF, the United Nations and the International Federation of Red Cross and Red crescent societies. In addition numerous governments provided aid in form of either resources or money. These governments include but are not limited to Argentina, Brazil, Chile, Colombia, Ecuador, Panama, Uruguay, Venezuela, Belgium, France, USA, Canada, Germany, Italy, Japan, Norway, Spain, Sweden, Switzerland, the European Union Humanitarian Aid Office and the United Kingdom.

== See also ==
- List of earthquakes in 2001
- List of earthquakes in Peru
