= San Pedro Perulapán =

- District
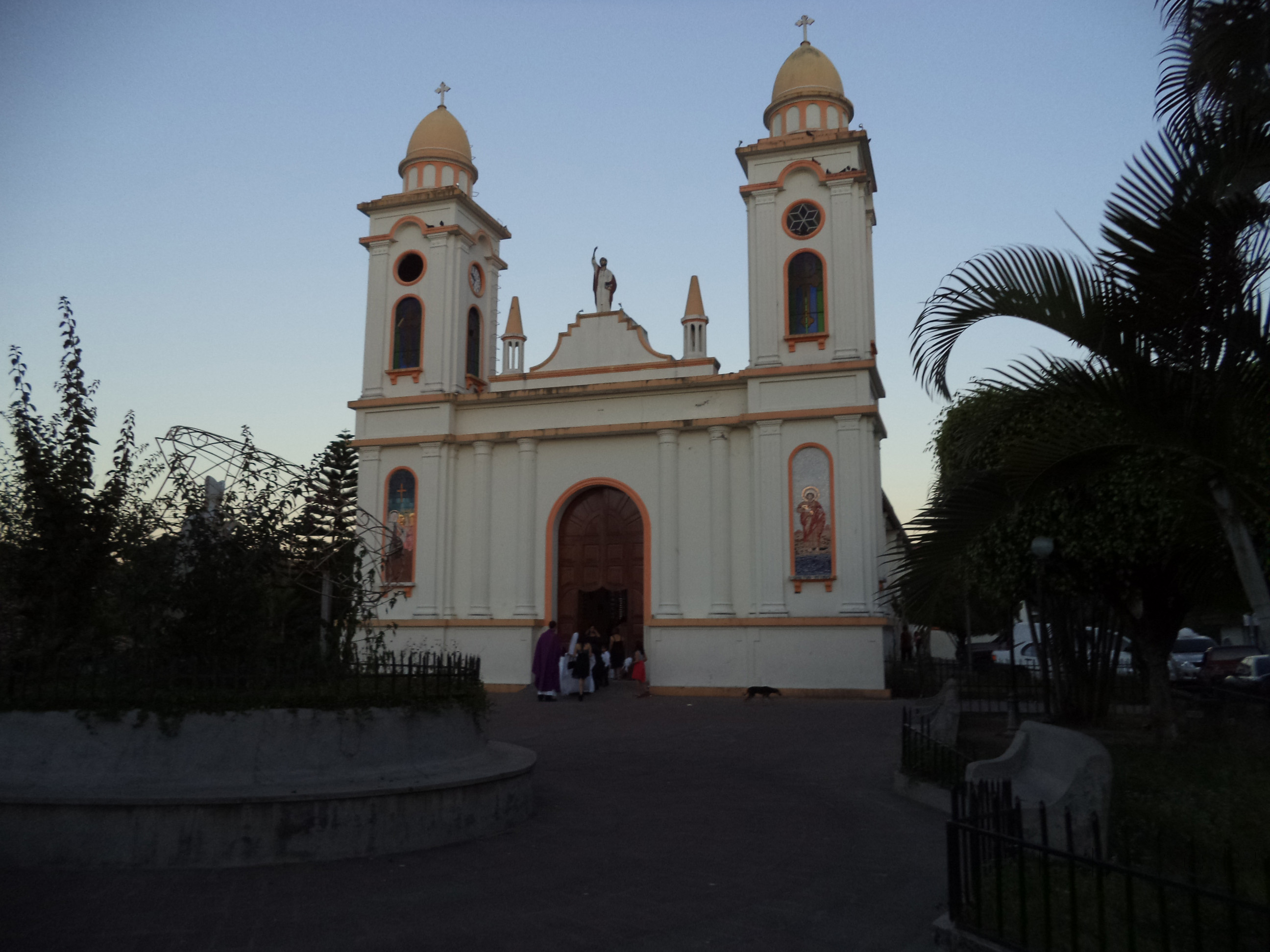
- Bust of Morazán at San Pedro Perulapán

- Location in El Salvador
- Coordinates: 13°46′N 89°2′W
- Country: El Salvador
- Department: Cuscatlán
- Municipality: Cuscatlán Norte
- Elevation: 1,965 ft (599 m)

Population (2024)
  - District: 51,414
  - Estimate (2026): 58,230
  - Rank: 29th in El Salvador
  - Urban: 44,106
  - Rural: 7,308

San Pedro Perulapán is a district in the Cuscatlán Department of El Salvador. San Pedro Perulapán is a town whose origins are pre-Columbian; it received the title of city on April 28, 1921. The Battle of San Pedro Perulapán occurred here on September 25, 1839, in which Francisco Morazán with 800 Salvadorans defeated 2,000 Honduran and Nicaraguan forces during the break-up of the Federal Republic of Central America. A bell tower in the town still has the bell whose toll announced the victory of the Salvadorans. The parish church contains an image of Saint Peter that still has the bullet hole it received during this battle. From the peak of the bell tower one can see the volcano of Guazapa.
