= Candelaria, El Salvador =

Candelaria
- District
- Flag

- Location in El Salvador
- Coordinates: 13°45′N 88°57′W
- Country: El Salvador
- Department: Cuscatlán Department

Area
  - District: 8.747 sq mi (22.655 km^{2})
- Elevation: 2,316 ft (706 m)

Population (2024)
  - District: 11,307
  - Rank: 120th in El Salvador
  - Urban: 8,005
  - Rural: 3,302

Candelaria is a municipality in the Cuscatlán department of El Salvador.
