= Yayantique =

- District
- Location in El Salvador
- Coordinates: 13°27′N 88°1′W
- Country: El Salvador
- Department: La Unión Department
- Elevation: 1,004 ft (306 m)

Yayantique is a district in the La Unión department of El Salvador. El Tejar de Yayantique is one of the cities within Yayantique.
