= Santa Cruz Michapa =

- District
- Location in El Salvador
- Coordinates: 13°44′N 88°58′W
- Country: El Salvador
- Department: Cuscatlán Department
- Elevation: 2,487 ft (758 m)

Population (2024)
  - District: 13,893
  - Rank: 98th in El Salvador
  - Urban: 12,226
  - Rural: 1,667

Santa Cruz Michapa is a municipality in the Cuscatlán department of El Salvador with a population of 12,225 (2001). It celebrates the Fiesta de la Santa Cruz every May 3.
