= 92nd meridian east =

Line of longitude

92nd meridian east

The meridian 92° east of Greenwich is a line of longitude that extends from the North Pole across the Arctic Ocean, Asia, the Indian Ocean, the Southern Ocean, and Antarctica to the South Pole.

The 92nd meridian east forms a great circle with the 88th meridian west.

== From Pole to Pole ==
Starting at the North Pole and heading south to the South Pole, the 92nd meridian east passes through:

Co-ordinates	Country, territory or sea	Notes
90°0′N 92°0′E	Arctic Ocean	Passing just east of Schmidt Island, Severnaya Zemlya, Krasnoyarsk Krai, Russia
80°24′N 92°0′E	Russia	Krasnoyarsk Krai — Komsomolets Island, Pioneer Island and the Sedov Archipelago, Severnaya Zemlya
79°25′N 92°0′E	Kara Sea	
77°38′N 92°0′E	Russia	Krasnoyarsk Krai — Kirov Island
77°35′N 92°0′E	Kara Sea	
75°43′N 92°0′E	Russia	Krasnoyarsk Krai; Tuva Republic — from 51°48′N 92°0′E
50°41′N 92°0′E	Mongolia	
45°4′N 92°0′E	People's Republic of China	Xinjiang; Qinghai — from 38°56′N 92°0′E; Tibet — from 32°50′N 92°0′E
27°44′N 92°0′E	India	Arunachal Pradesh — claimed by People's Republic of China
27°28′N 92°0′E	Bhutan	
26°51′N 92°0′E	India	Assam; Meghalaya — from 26°2′N 92°0′E
25°11′N 92°0′E	Bangladesh	
24°23′N 92°0′E	India	Tripura
23°41′N 92°0′E	Bangladesh	
21°23′N 92°0′E	Indian Ocean	Passing just west of the Andaman Islands, India (at 11°33′N 92°12′E)
60°0′S 92°0′E	Southern Ocean	Passing just west of Drygalski Island, claimed by Australia (at 65°44′S 92°12′E)
66°29′S 92°0′E	Antarctica	Australian Antarctic Territory, claimed by Australia

Next westward: 91st meridian east	92nd meridian east forms a great circle with 88th meridian west	Next eastward: 93rd meridian east
