= Yucuaiquín =

Yucuaiquin Yucuaiquín
- Municipality
- Municipality of Yucuaiquin
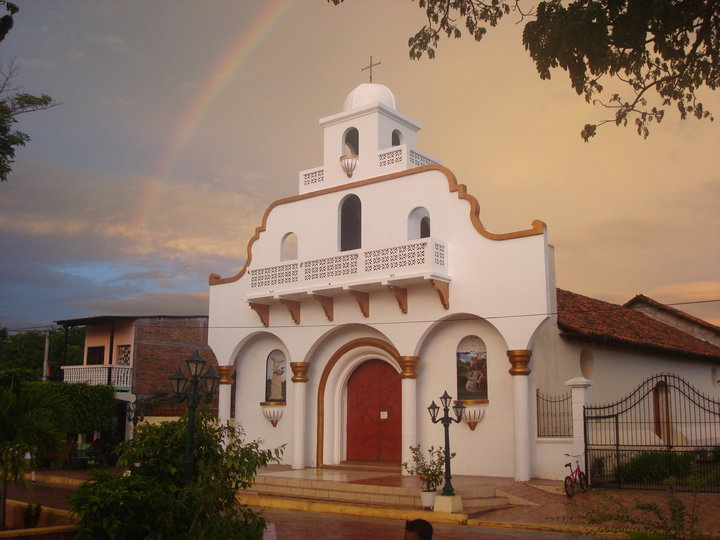
- Parish church of Yucuaiquin

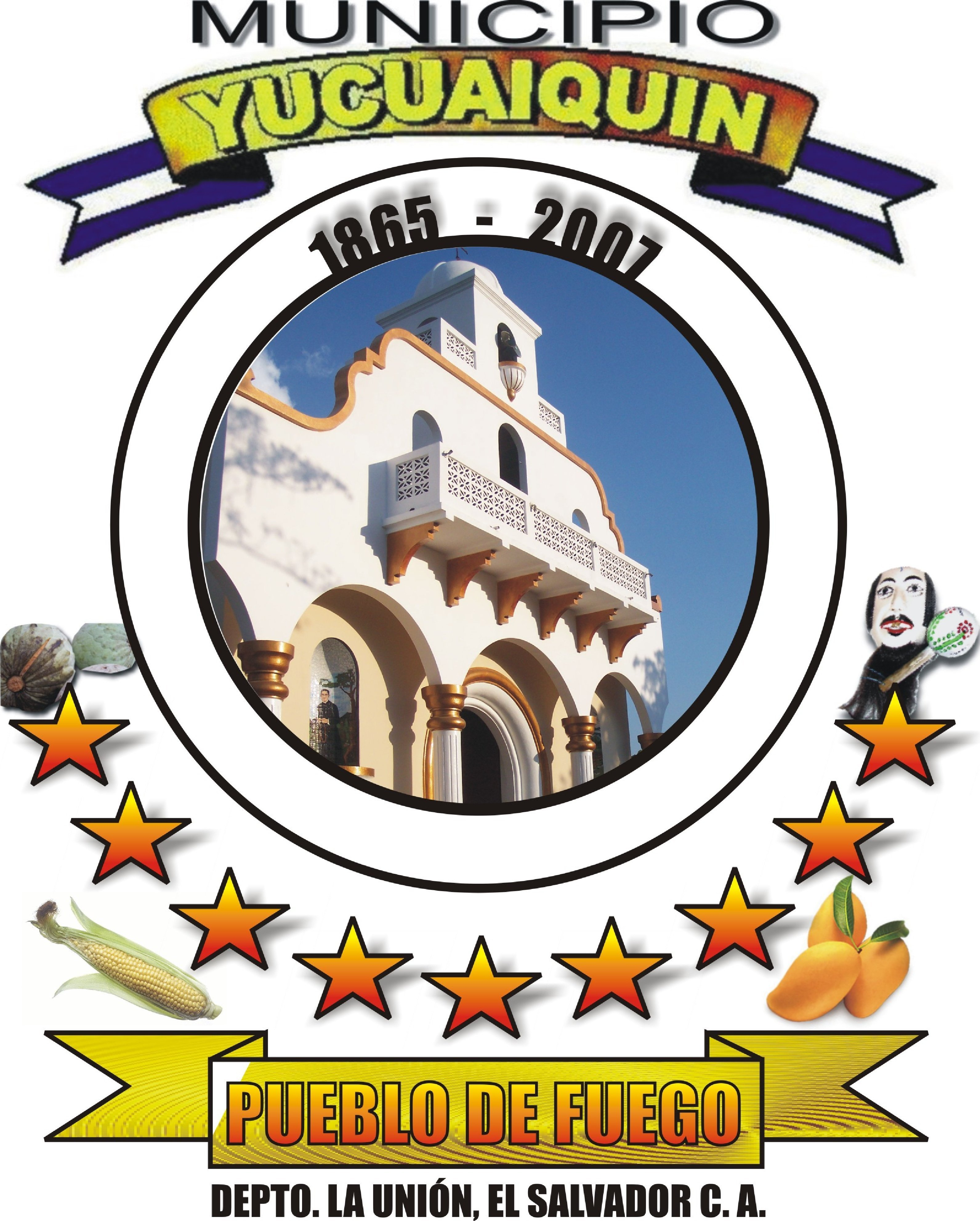
- Seal
- Nickname: Land of Fire
- Motto: Spanish: Un paraíso en la Tierra de Fuego (A paradise in the Land of Fire)
- Location in El Salvador
- Coordinates: 13°33′N 88°0′W
- Country: El Salvador
- Department: La Unión Department
- Founded: June 12, 1824

Government
  - Mayor: Mr. Oscar René Mendoza (FMLN)

Area
  - Total: 21.31 sq mi (55.18 km^{2})
- Elevation: 1,510 ft (460 m)

Population (2007)
  - Total: 6,799
  - Density: 319.1/sq mi (123.21/km^{2})
- Demonym: Yucuaiquinian
- Time zone: UTC-6
- Area code: +503

Yucuaiquin is a municipality in La Unión Department of El Salvador, located on the slopes of Cerro La Cruz.

== Name ==
Yucuaiquin is a native word derived from two words in the Lenca language known as Potón: "Yuku", which means fire, and "Aykin", which means land or town; so the name can be interpreted as "Fire Land", according to historian Jorge Lardé y Larín.
Historically, the name spelling has evolved from Yncuayquín in 1549 to Inquiaquín (1573), Yoayquín (1577), Yocoaiquín (1689) and later to Jucuaiquín or Yucquín.

== History ==
Yucuaiquin is one of the Salvadoran Lenca towns, whose origins dates back to the pre-Columbian times; when the Spaniards arrived, Yucuaiquin was located in a valley called Llano Grande. The area was populated by Lenca natives. In the middle of the 16th century, Yucuaiquin had a population of around 300 inhabitants, as an annex to the parish of Ereguayquin. In 1786, it joined the San Alejo district and on June 12, 1824, the municipality was founded as part of the San Miguel Department, belonging until June 22, 1865, when it became part of the district of La Unión, in the department of the same name. On April 28, 1926, the Salvadoran legislature issued the decree by which it granted the Yucuaiquin Town the title of Villa, a distinction conferred upon them for having "acquired considerable development in agriculture, commerce and ornamentation". On February 15, 2002, by legislative decree, it obtained the title of City, for its economic growth and for having all the services and modernization necessary to deserve it. And on October 3, 2009 was instituted the Carnival of Fire.

== Politics ==
The current mayor of Yucuaiquín is Mrs. Rosi Ramírez, a position she has held since 2021.

== Administrative divisions ==
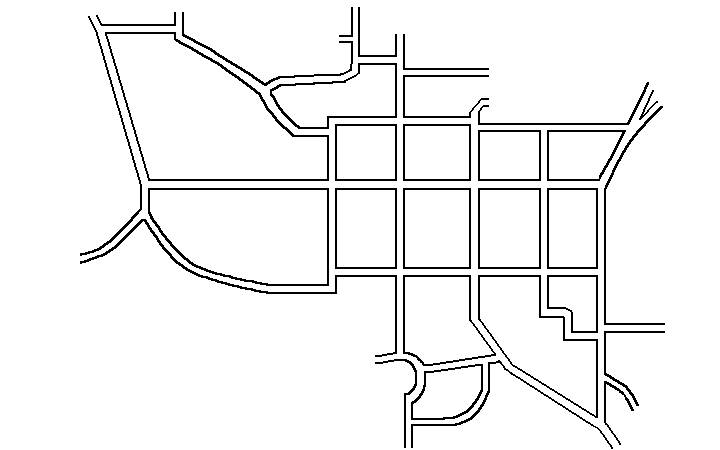
City Map

The municipality is divided into nine cantons and the city:

City:

- Yucuaiquin

Cantons:

- Candelaria
- Ciricuario
- El Carmen
- Hatillos
- La Cañada
- Las Cruces
- Las Marías
- Tepemechín
- Valle Nuevo
- las chacaras
- El berrinche

Each canton is subdivided into caseríos (like a neighbourhood).

== Culture ==
Spanish is the only language of Yucuaiquin. From the last Saturday of September to the 6th of October, Yucuaiquinians celebrate their "Fiestas Patronales" (Holidays) in honor of their patron saint, St. Francis of Assisi.

== Sister city ==
(United States) Somerville, Massachusetts
