= El Carmen, Cuscatlán =

El Carmen
- District
- Location in El Salvador
- Coordinates: 13°43′N 88°54′W
- Country: El Salvador
- Department: Cuscatlán Department
- Elevation: 2,182 ft (665 m)

Population (2024)
  - District: 15,961
  - Rank: 88th in El Salvador
  - Urban: 15,961

El Carmen is a municipality in the Cuscatlán department of El Salvador.
