= 91st meridian east =

Line of longitude

91st meridian east

The meridian 91° east of Greenwich is a line of longitude that extends from the North Pole across the Arctic Ocean, Asia, the Indian Ocean, the Southern Ocean, and Antarctica to the South Pole.

The 91st meridian east forms a great ellipse with the 89th meridian west.

== From Pole to Pole ==
Starting at the North Pole and heading south to the South Pole, the 91st meridian east passes through:

Co-ordinates	Country, territory or sea	Notes
90°0′N 91°0′E	Arctic Ocean	
81°13′N 91°0′E	Russia	Krasnoyarsk Krai — Schmidt Island, Severnaya Zemlya
81°2′N 91°0′E	Kara Sea	Passing just west of Pioneer Island, Severnaya Zemlya, Krasnoyarsk Krai, Russia
79°34′N 91°0′E	Russia	Krasnoyarsk Krai — Sedov Archipelago, Severnaya Zemlya
79°32′N 91°0′E	Kara Sea	Passing just east of the Kirov Islands, Krasnoyarsk Krai, Russia
75°36′N 91°0′E	Russia	Krasnoyarsk Krai; Republic of Khakassia — from 54°37′N 91°0′E; Krasnoyarsk Krai — from 52°37′N 91°0′E; Tuva Republic — from 51°56′N 91°0′E
50°28′N 91°0′E	Mongolia	
46°46′N 91°0′E	People's Republic of China	Xinjiang
46°25′N 91°0′E	Mongolia	
46°8′N 91°0′E	People's Republic of China	Xinjiang - for about 16 km (9.9 mi)
46°0′N 91°0′E	Mongolia	
45°12′N 91°0′E	People's Republic of China	Xinjiang; Qinghai — from 38°42′N 91°0′E; Xinjiang — from 37°30′N 91°0′E; Qinghai — from 36°55′N 91°0′E; Xinjiang — from 36°33′N 91°0′E; Qinghai — from 36°6′N 91°0′E; Tibet — from 33°14′N 91°0′E, passing just west of Lhasa (at 29°39′N 91°8′E)
28°0′N 91°0′E	Bhutan	
26°47′N 91°0′E	India	Assam; Meghalaya — from 25°53′N 91°0′E
25°11′N 91°0′E	Bangladesh	Mainland and islands in the Ganges Delta
22°14′N 91°0′E	Indian Ocean	
60°0′S 91°0′E	Southern Ocean	
66°37′S 91°0′E	Antarctica	Australian Antarctic Territory, claimed by Australia

Next westward: 90th meridian east	91st meridian east forms a great circle with 89th meridian west	Next eastward: 92nd meridian east
