= Cojutepeque =

- District
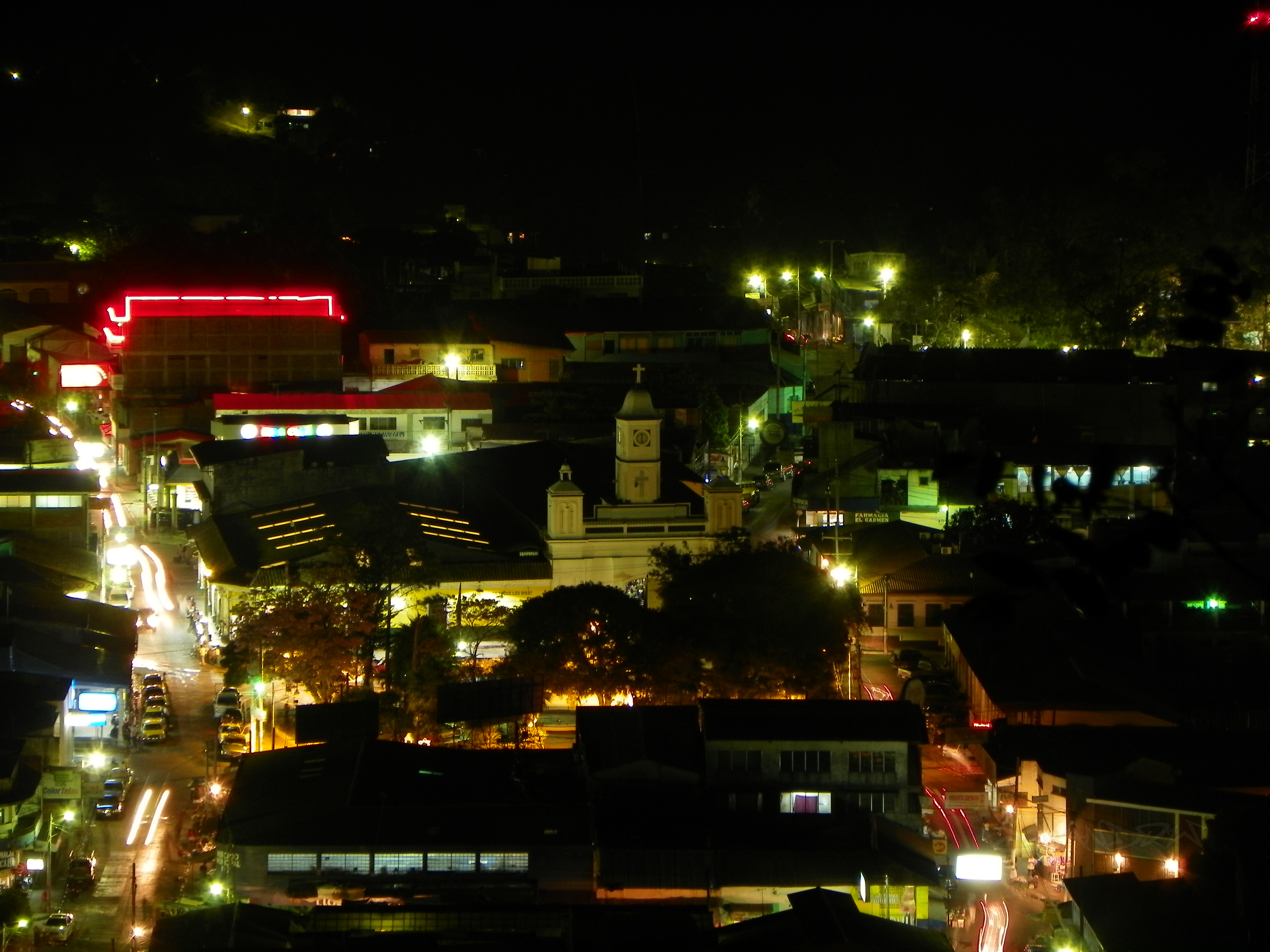
- Cojutepeque at night

- Location in El Salvador
- Coordinates: 13°43′18″N 88°56′4″W
- Country: El Salvador
- Department: Cuscatlán Department

Area
  - District: 31.43 km^{2} (12.14 sq mi)
- Elevation: 853 m (2,799 ft)

Population (2024)
  - District: 46,839
  - Rank: 30th in El Salvador
  - Urban: 45,630
  - Rural: 1,209

Cojutepeque (Spanish pronunciation: [koxuteˈpeke]) is the capital city of El Salvador's Cuscatlán department. It also served as the capital of El Salvador for several years. It also serves as the administrative centre for the surrounding municipality of Cojutepeque. Its population is estimated at 70,000 people with about 85% living in the urban areas of the municipality.

The name Cojutepeque is derived from the Nahuatl words for "at the hill of the coyotes". It received the title of city in 1846. The ancient churches of San Juan Degollado, San José and San Sebastián can be found in the city. Cojutepeque's patron saint is Saint Sebastian, and there is a fair in honor of Saint John the Baptist (San Juan Degollado).

Cereals, sugarcane, loaf-sugar, panela, and fruit are cultivated and grown here, and local industries include the manufacture of hats made out of palm-fronds. The sausages of Cojutepeque (los chorizos de Cojutepeque) are known throughout El Salvador.

Its principal tourist attraction is Cerro de las Pavas, from which the lake of Ilopango, the volcano of San Vicente, and the Valley of Jiboa can be seen.

== Geography ==
The Pan-American Highway connects Cojutepeque with San Salvador 33 km away.

=== Climate ===
Its height is 850 meters above sea level; it enjoys a pleasant climate. Its nickname is "City of the Mists".

Climate data for Cojutepeque (1991–2020)
Month	Jan	Feb	Mar	Apr	May	Jun	Jul	Aug	Sep	Oct	Nov	Dec	Year
Mean daily maximum °C (°F)	30.1 (86.2)	31.6 (88.9)	32.1 (89.8)	31.7 (89.1)	30.2 (86.4)	29.2 (84.6)	30.2 (86.4)	29.9 (85.8)	28.6 (83.5)	28.3 (82.9)	28.7 (83.7)	29.3 (84.7)	30.0 (86.0)
Daily mean °C (°F)	22.0 (71.6)	22.9 (73.2)	23.4 (74.1)	23.7 (74.7)	23.3 (73.9)	22.9 (73.2)	23.2 (73.8)	22.9 (73.2)	22.3 (72.1)	22.2 (72.0)	21.9 (71.4)	21.9 (71.4)	22.7 (72.9)
Mean daily minimum °C (°F)	17.6 (63.7)	18.3 (64.9)	19.3 (66.7)	20.5 (68.9)	20.4 (68.7)	20.1 (68.2)	19.9 (67.8)	19.8 (67.6)	19.7 (67.5)	19.5 (67.1)	18.5 (65.3)	18.0 (64.4)	19.3 (66.7)
Average precipitation mm (inches)	1.9 (0.07)	3.2 (0.13)	13.3 (0.52)	51.0 (2.01)	206.9 (8.15)	229.2 (9.02)	264.1 (10.40)	306.2 (12.06)	319.0 (12.56)	248.3 (9.78)	60.4 (2.38)	8.5 (0.33)	1,712.1 (67.41)
Average relative humidity (%)	69	67	69	75	83	86	82	85	90	88	80	74	78.9
Source: Ministerio de Medio Ambiente y Recursos Naturales

== Cerro de las Pavas ==
The peak known as Cerro de las Pavas can be reached via two roads from Cojutepeque: one for cars, the other a zigzagging path for pedestrians.

In 1924, Governor Fidel Antonio Novoa Fuentes began an improvement program for the peak and built the park known as Parque de Montaña. During the administration of President Óscar Osorio, the pathways leading to the peak were improved thanks to the efforts of the poet Raúl Contreras.

There is a grotto on the peak that displays an image of the Our Lady of Fátima. A pilgrimage to this grotto occurs in May and is a major religious festival in El Salvador.

== Chorizos ==
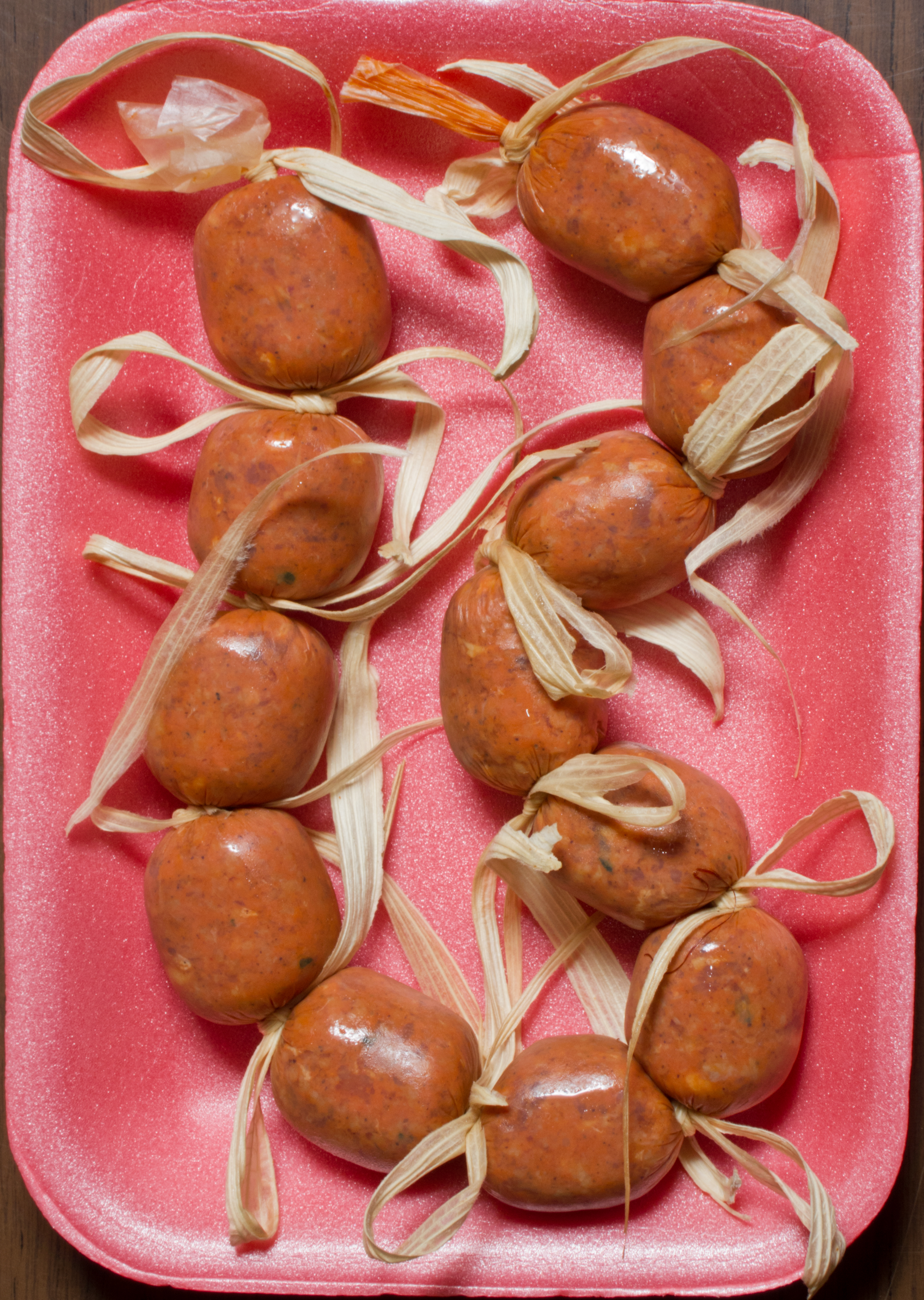
Example of Chorizos, made in Cojutepeque, as bought in a local supermarket

Cojutepeque is known in El Salvador for various sausages or chorizos, especially the Chorizos de Cojutepeque. These chorizos are typically tied with corn husks between the links. The chorizos are shipped to other parts of the country and sold. The example on the left is made with pork, beef, iodized salt, and additives (soy protein, sodium nitrate, sodium benzoate, achiote, herbs, and spices).

== Sport ==
The football club Cojutepeque F.C. was based in Cojutepeque.
