= Lislique =

Municipality in El Savador

- District
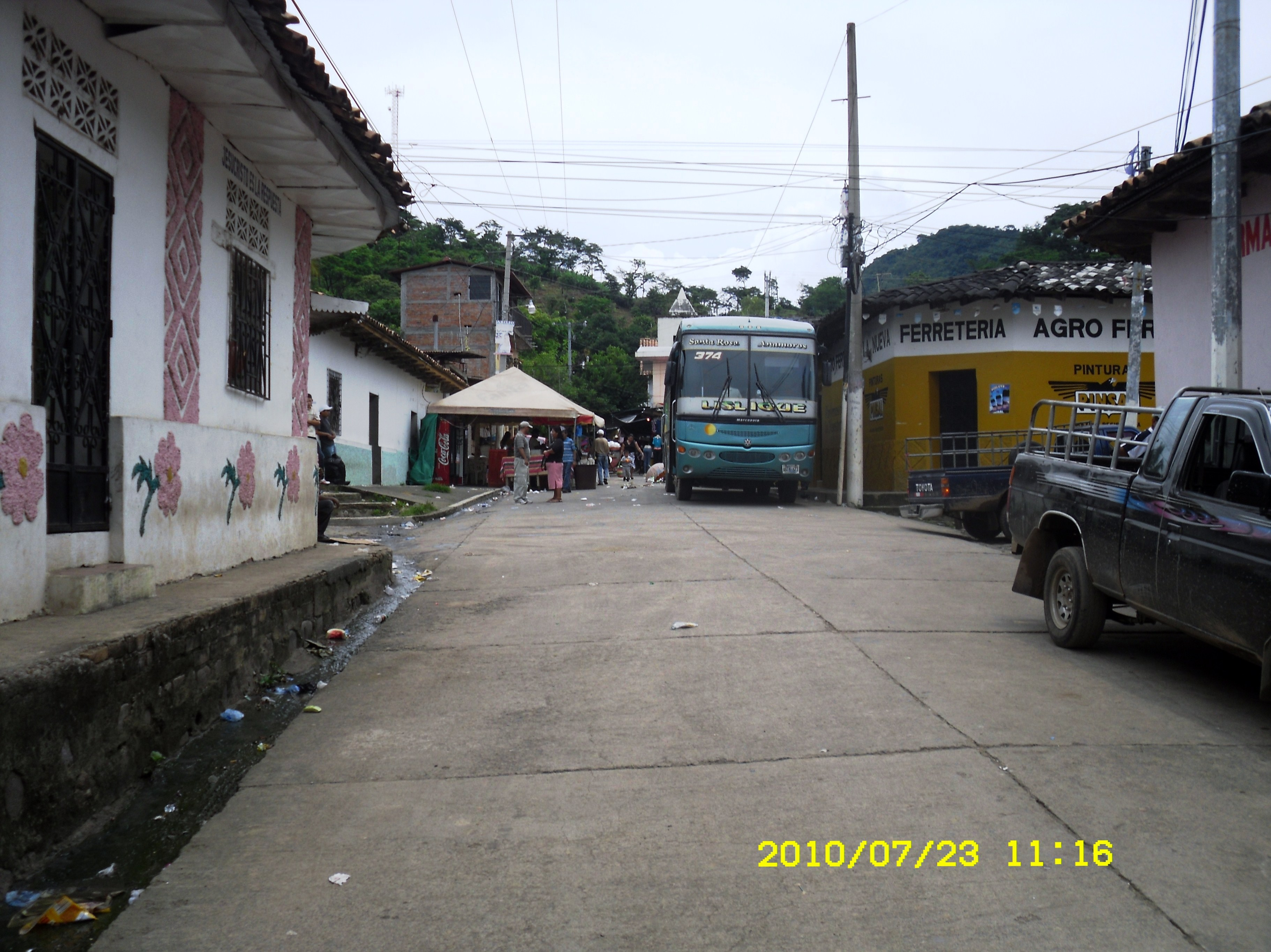
- Lislique panorama

- Location in El Salvador
- Coordinates: 13°48′N 87°53′W
- Country: El Salvador
- Department: La Unión Department
- Elevation: 833 ft (254 m)

Population (2024)
  - Total: 12,732

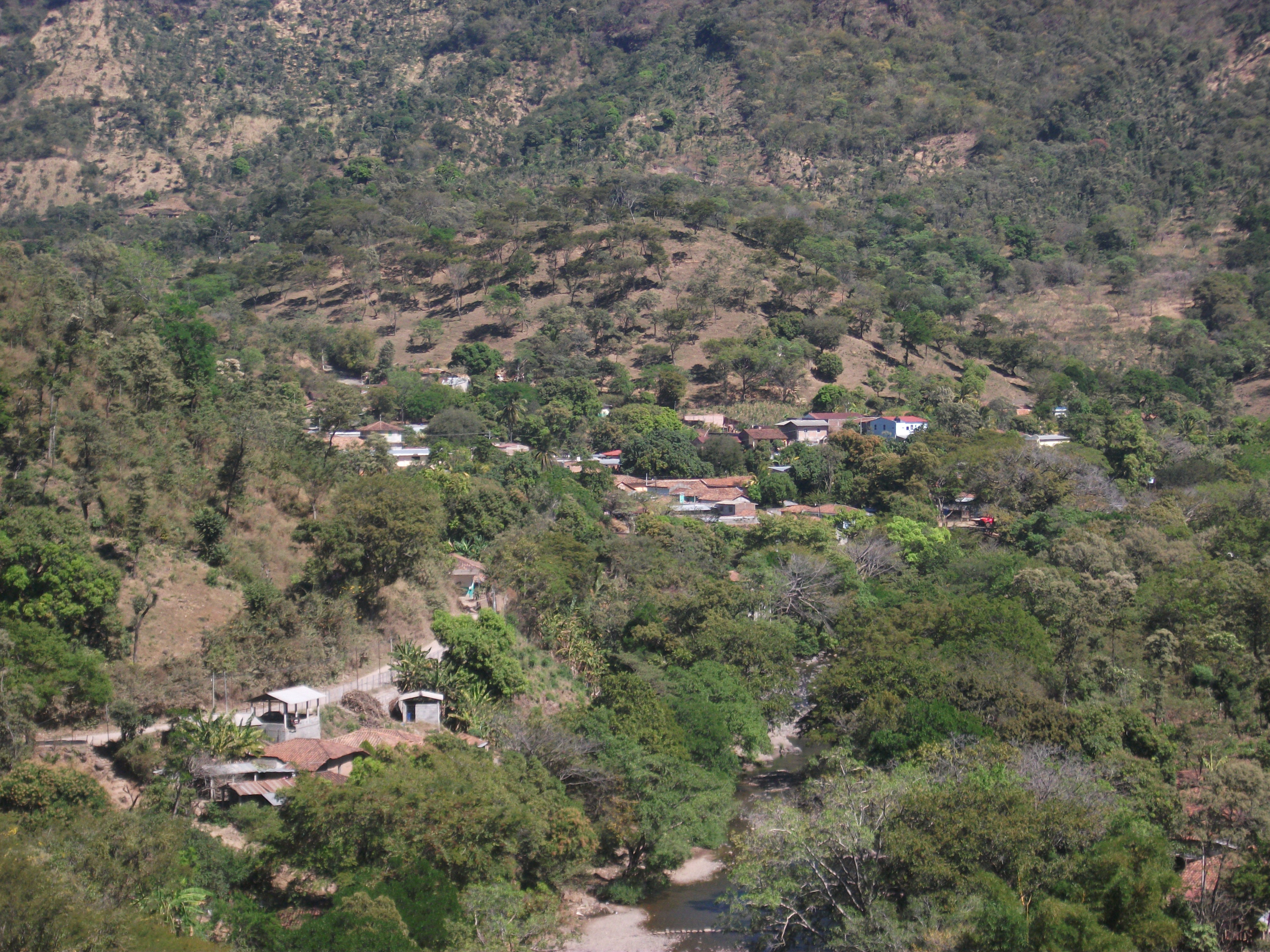
Lislique

Lislique is a municipality in the La Unión department of El Salvador. As of 2007, the population was 13,385.
