= El Carmen, La Unión =

El Carmen
- District
- Location in El Salvador
- Coordinates: 13°21′N 88°0′W
- Country: El Salvador
- Department: La Unión Department
- Elevation: 374 ft (114 m)

El Carmen is a district in the La Unión department of El Salvador.
