= La Unión Department =

Department of El Salvador

La Unión
- Department
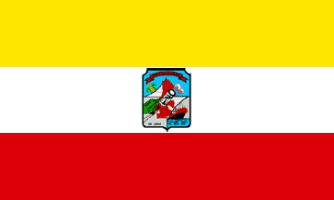
- Flag

- Location within El Salvador
- Coordinates: 13°32′31″N 87°52′48″W
- Country: El Salvador
- Created (given current status): 1865
- Capital: La Unión

Area
  - Total: 2,074.3 km^{2} (800.9 sq mi)
  - Rank: Ranked 3rd

Population (2024)
  - Total: 224,375
  - Rank: Ranked 8th
  - Density: 108.17/km^{2} (280.16/sq mi)
- Time zone: UTC−6 (CST)
- ISO 3166 code: SV-UN

La Unión (Spanish pronunciation: [lawˈnjon]) is the easternmost department of El Salvador. Its capital is La Unión. It covers a total of 2,074 square kilometres (801 sq mi) and has a population of 263,200. The department was created on June 22, 1865, and the city of La Unión was made its capital. The Conchagua Temple was built in 1693 and it is one of tourist attractions of the department, as well as containing archeological ruins in Intipucá and Meanguera.

== Municipalities ==
1. La Unión Norte
2. La Unión Sur

== Districts ==
1. Anamorós
2. Bolívar
3. Concepción de Oriente
4. Conchagua
5. El Carmen
6. El Sauce
7. Intipucá
8. La Unión
9. Lislique
10. Meanguera del Golfo
11. Nueva Esparta
12. Pasaquina
13. Polorós
14. San Alejo
15. San José
16. Santa Rosa de Lima
17. Yayantique
18. Yucuaiquín

== Natural resources ==
The most important agricultural products are coffee, grass, fruits, cocoa, oleaginous seeds, and sugar cane. The manufacturing of palm and tortoiseshell products, panela, mangrove extract, and fish. It also has reserves of gold, iron, barium, and mercury.
