= Cuscatlán Department =

Department of El Salvador

Cuscatlán
- Department
- Flag

- Location within El Salvador
- Coordinates: 13°50′17″N 89°01′52″W
- Country: El Salvador
- Created (given current status): 1835
- Seat: Cojutepeque

Area
  - Total: 756.19 km^{2} (291.97 sq mi)
  - Rank: Ranked 14th

Population (2024)
  - Total: 244,901
  - Rank: Ranked 12th
  - Density: 323.86/km^{2} (838.80/sq mi)
- Time zone: UTC−6 (CST)
- ISO 3166 code: SV-CU

Cuscatlán (Spanish pronunciation: [kuskaˈtlan]) is a department of El Salvador, located in the center of the country. With a surface area of 756.19 square kilometres (291.97 mi^{2}), it is El Salvador's smallest department. Cuscatlán or Cuzcatlán was the name the original inhabitants of the Western part of the country gave to most of the territory that is now El Salvador. In their language it means "land of precious jewels". It was created on 22 May 1835. Suchitoto was the first capital of the department but on 12 November 1861, Cojutepeque was made the capital. It is known in producing fruits, tobacco, sugar cane, and coffee among other items. The department is famous for its chorizos from the city of Cojutepeque.

== Municipalities ==
1. Cuscatlán Norte
2. Cuscatlán Sur

== Districts ==
1. Candelaria
2. Cojutepeque
3. El Carmen
4. El Rosario
5. Monte San Juan
6. Oratorio de Concepción
7. San Bartolomé Perulapía
8. San Cristóbal
9. San José Guayabal
10. San Pedro Perulapán
11. San Rafael Cedros
12. San Ramón
13. Santa Cruz Analquito
14. Santa Cruz Michapa
15. Suchitoto
16. Tenancingo
