= 2013–14 Segunda División de Fútbol Salvadoreño =

Segunda División de Fútbol Salvadoreño
- Season: 2013–14
- Champions: Apertura: Pasaquina, Clausura: Once Lobos
- Promoted: Pasaquina/ Once Lobos
- Relegated: Marte Soyapango, ADI

The 2013–14 season (officially known as Liga de Plata and also as Torneo Luis Baltazar Ramírez) will be El Salvador's Segunda División de Fútbol Salvadoreño The season will be split into two championships Apertura 2013 and Clausura 2014. The champions of the Apertura and Clausura play the direct promotion playoff every year. The winner of that series ascends to Primera División de Fútbol de El Salvador.

== Promotion and relegation 2013–2014 season ==
Teams promoted to Primera División de Fútbol Profesional - Apertura 2013

- C.D. Dragon

Teams relegated to Segunda División de Fútbol Salvadoreño - Apertura 2013

- Once Municipal

Teams relegated to Tercera División de Fútbol Profesional - Apertura 2013

- Espíritu Santo
- Arcense

Teams promoted from Tercera Division De Fútbol Profesional - Apertura 2013

- Real Destroyer ( Bought the spot of Isidro Metapan B )
- C.D. Chalatenango
- C.D. Topiltzín
- C.D. Sonsonate ( Bought the spot of C.D. Titán )

Teams that failed to register for the Apertura 2013

- Metapan B (Sold their spot to Real Destroyer)
- C.D. Titán (Sold their spot to Sonsonate)

== Teams ==
| Team | Location | Stadium | Capacity |
|---|---|---|---|
| ADI F.C. | Intipucá, La Union | Estadio de Intipucá | |
| C.D. Aspirante | Jucuapa, Usulután | Estadio Municipal de Jucuapa | |
| C.D. Brasilia | Suchitoto, Cuscatlán | Estadio Municipal de Suchitoto | |
| C.D. Chalatenango | Chalatenango, Chalatenango | Estadio José Gregorio Martínez | |
| Ciclon de Golfo | La Unión | Estadio Marcelino Imbers | |
| El Roble | Ilobasco, Cabañas | Estadio Mauricio Vides | |
| C.D. La Asunción | Anamorós, La Union | Estadio Jose Eliseo Reyes | |
| C.D. Liberal | Quelepa, San Miguel | Estadio Municipal de Quelapa | |
| C.D. Marte Soyapango | Soyapango, San Salvador | Estadio Jorgito Melendez | |
| C.D. Municipal Limeno | Santa Rosa de Lima, La Unión | Estadio Jose Ramon Flores | |
| Once Lobos | Chalchuapa, Santa Ana | Estadio Cesar Hernández | |
| Once Municipal | Ahuachapán | Simeón Magaña | |
| C.D. Pasaquina | Santa Rosa de Lima, La Unión | Estadio Jose Ramon Flores | |
| C.D. Platense Municipal Zacatecoluca | Zacatecoluca, La Paz | Estadio Antonio Toledo Valle | |
| Real Destroyer | La Libertad | Estadio Puerto La Libertad | |
| C.D. Sonsonate | Sonsonate | Anna Mercedes Campos | |
| C.D. Topiltzin | Jiquilisco | Estadio INDES de Jiquilisco. | |
| Turín FESA F.C. | San Luis Talpa, La Paz | Estadio Hacienda Santa Clara | |
| C.D. Vendaval | Apopa, San Salvador | Estadio Joaquín Gutiérrez de Apopa | |
| C.D. Guadalupano | San Miguel, San Miguel | Estadio Ciuda Guadalupe | |

=== Personnel and sponsoring ===
| Team | Manager^{1} | Chairman | Team captain | Kit Manufacturer | Sponsor |
|---|---|---|---|---|---|
| ADI F.C. | (El Salvador) Edwin Zelaya | (El Salvador) | (El Salvador) | | |
| C.D. Aspirante | (El Salvador) | (El Salvador) | (El Salvador) | | |
| C.D. Brasilia | (El Salvador) Milton Melendez | (El Salvador) | (El Salvador) | Milan | Ria |
| C.D. Chalatenango | (El Salvador) German Perez | (El Salvador) | (El Salvador) | | |
| Ciclon de Golfo | (El Salvador) | (El Salvador) | (El Salvador) | | Ahorre En Aguca De R.L., Caja de Credito La Union |
| El Roble | (El Salvador) Guillermo Navarro | (El Salvador) | (El Salvador) | | |
| C.D. La Asunción | (El Salvador) | (El Salvador) | (El Salvador) | | |
| C.D. Liberal | (El Salvador) Nelson Mauricio Ancheta | (El Salvador) | (El Salvador) | | |
| C.D. Marte Soyapango | (El Salvador) Miguel Soriano | (El Salvador) | (El Salvador) | | |
| C.D. Municipal Limeno | (El Salvador) Jose Romero | (El Salvador) | (El Salvador) | Milan (Jaguar Sportic) | Ria |
| Once Lobos | (El Salvador) Cesar Acevedo | (El Salvador) | (El Salvador) | | Alba, |
| Once Municipal | (Argentina) Juan Andres Sarulyte | (El Salvador) | (El Salvador) | | |
| C.D. Pasaquina | (El Salvador) David Ramírez | (El Salvador) | (El Salvador) | | |
| C.D. Platense Municipal Zacatecoluca | (El Salvador) | (El Salvador) | (El Salvador) | | |
| Real Destroyer | (El Salvador) Ángel Orellana | (El Salvador) William Murillo | (El Salvador) | | |
| C.D. Sonsonate | (Uruguay) Ruben Alonso | (El Salvador) | (El Salvador) | | |
| C.D. Topiltzin | (El Salvador) Roberto Hernández | (El Salvador) | (El Salvador) | | |
| Turín FESA F.C. | (El Salvador) Carlos Recinos | (El Salvador) | (El Salvador) | Milan (Jaguar Sportic) | Herbalife, Digicel |
| C.D. Vendaval | (El Salvador) Carlos Orellana | (El Salvador) | (El Salvador) | | |
| C.D. Guadalupano | (Brazil) Eraldo Correia | (El Salvador) | (El Salvador) | | |

== Apertura ==
=== Apertura 2013 Group standings ===
==== Grupo Centro Occidente ====
| Pos | Team | Pld | W | D | L | GF | GA | GD | Pts | Qualification | SON | OLB | FES | ROB | CHA | BRA | SOY | VEN | OMU | RED |
|---|---|---|---|---|---|---|---|---|---|---|---|---|---|---|---|---|---|---|---|---|
| 1 | Sonsonate | 18 | 9 | 5 | 4 | 27 | 15 | +12 | 32 | Qualification for playoffs | | 2–1 | 1–1 | 1–1 | 0–2 | 1–1 | 2–0 | 4–0 | 3–1 | 1–0 |
| 2 | Once Lobos | 18 | 9 | 4 | 5 | 23 | 14 | +9 | 31 | Qualification for playoffs | 0–0 | | 0–1 | 1–0 | 3–1 | 3–0 | 2–2 | 1–0 | 3–1 | 3–0 |
| 3 | Turín FESA | 18 | 8 | 6 | 4 | 26 | 19 | +7 | 30 | Qualification for playoffs | 0–1 | 0–0 | | 3–1 | 2–0 | 1–0 | 1–1 | 2–0 | 3–0 | 1–0 |
| 4 | El Roble | 18 | 8 | 3 | 7 | 37 | 29 | +8 | 27 | Qualification for playoffs | 1–3 | 5–2 | 3–0 | | 3–1 | 2–1 | 0–1 | 2–2 | 1–2 | 7–3 |
| 5 | Chalatenango | 18 | 7 | 6 | 5 | 27 | 25 | +2 | 27 | | 0–0 | 1–0 | 2–1 | 4–1 | | 1–2 | 1–0 | 0–0 | 1–3 | 2–2 |
| 6 | Brasilia | 18 | 8 | 3 | 7 | 29 | 29 | 0 | 27 | | 2–1 | 1–0 | 4–3 | 0–2 | 3–3 | | 1–2 | 3–1 | 1–0 | 3–2 |
| 7 | Marte Soyapango | 18 | 7 | 2 | 9 | 25 | 25 | 0 | 23 | | 1–0 | 1–0 | 1–2 | 2–1 | 1–3 | 1–2 | | 0–1 | 1–3 | 1–2 |
| 8 | Vendaval | 18 | 6 | 5 | 7 | 21 | 22 | −1 | 23 | | 1–0 | 1–2 | 3–3 | 1–1 | 0–1 | 2–0 | 1–3 | | 0–0 | 3–0 |
| 9 | Once Municipal | 18 | 5 | 2 | 11 | 20 | 35 | −15 | 17 | | 2–5 | 0–1 | 0–0 | 1–3 | 2–2 | 2–1 | 2–0 | 0–1 | | 2–1 |
| 10 | Real Destroyer | 18 | 3 | 4 | 11 | 23 | 45 | −22 | 13 | | 1–2 | 1–0 | 2–2 | 1–3 | 2–2 | 2–2 | 1–7 | 0–4 | 3–0 | |

==== Grupo Centro Oriente ====
| Pos | Team | Pld | W | D | L | GF | GA | GD | Pts | Qualification | TOP | PAS | ASP | LIB | ASU | MLI | CDG | GUA | PLA | ADI |
|---|---|---|---|---|---|---|---|---|---|---|---|---|---|---|---|---|---|---|---|---|
| 1 | Topiltzín | 18 | 9 | 5 | 4 | 27 | 22 | +5 | 32 | Qualification for playoffs | | 1–2 | 1–1 | 1–0 | 4–2 | 2–1 | 0–0 | 2–1 | 3–2 | 3–2 |
| 2 | Pasaquina | 18 | 9 | 4 | 5 | 30 | 19 | +11 | 31 | Qualification for playoffs | 1–1 | | 0–1 | 4–2 | 3–2 | 0–0 | 3–1 | 2–1 | 3–1 | 3–2 |
| 3 | Aspirante | 18 | 8 | 7 | 3 | 19 | 11 | +8 | 31 | Qualification for playoffs | 0–1 | 1–1 | | 2–0 | 1–2 | 1–1 | 1–0 | 0–0 | 0–0 | 3–1 |
| 4 | Liberal | 18 | 8 | 6 | 4 | 25 | 18 | +7 | 30 | Qualification for playoffs | 4–2 | 2–0 | 0–0 | | 3–3 | 1–0 | 2–0 | 1–1 | 2–1 | 0–0 |
| 5 | La Asunción | 18 | 8 | 5 | 5 | 29 | 24 | +5 | 29 | | 1–2 | 0–0 | 0–1 | 2–1 | | 0–0 | 1–0 | 1–1 | 2–0 | 3–3 |
| 6 | Municipal Limeño | 18 | 6 | 7 | 5 | 25 | 20 | +5 | 25 | | 0–0 | 1–0 | 1–1 | 1–1 | 1–2 | | 1–1 | 3–1 | 2–0 | 2–0 |
| 7 | Ciclon de Golfo | 18 | 7 | 3 | 8 | 15 | 19 | −4 | 24 | | 1–0 | 1–0 | 0–2 | 1–2 | 2–1 | 2–1 | | 3–2 | 1–1 | 1–0 |
| 8 | Guadalupano (Note: C.D. Guadalupano bought the spot of C.D. Vista Hermosa for the 2013–14 season.) | 18 | 5 | 4 | 9 | 22 | 26 | −4 | 19 | | 2–1 | 2–1 | 0–1 | 0–1 | 2–3 | 2–4 | 1–0 | | 1–0 | 4–1 |
| 9 | Platense | 18 | 4 | 4 | 10 | 14 | 23 | −9 | 16 | | 1–1 | 0–2 | 1–0 | 0–0 | 0–1 | 1–0 | 0–1 | 1–0 | | 3–1 |
| 10 | ADI F.C. | 18 | 2 | 3 | 13 | 23 | 47 | −24 | 9 | | 1–2 | 0–5 | 2–3 | 0–3 | 0–3 | 5–6 | 1–0 | 1–1 | 3–2 | |

=== Second stage ===
Quarterfinals
8 | Sonsonate | 0 | 2 | 2
2 | Liberal | 0 | 0 | 0
7 | Pasaquina | 0 | 5 | 5
1 | Turin Fesa | 1 | 2 | 3
4 | Topiltzín | 0 | 1 | 1
3 | El Roble | 3 | 1 | 4
6 | Once Lobos | 2 | 0 | 2
5 | Aspirante | 1 | 0 | 1

Semifinals
5 | Sonsonate | 0 | 0 | 0
1 | Pasaquina | 1 | 1 | 2
8 | El Roble | 1 | 2 | 3 (3)
3 | Once Lobos | 3 | 0 | 3 (4)

Final
1 | Pasaquina' | 0 | 2 | 2
3 | Once Lobos | 0 | 1 | 1

==== Finals ====
===== First leg =====
22 December 2013
15:00 UTC-6

| Once Lobos | 0-0 | C.D. Pasaquina |
|---|---|---|
| None | | None |

===== Second leg =====
28 December 2013
15:00 UTC-6

| C.D. Pasaquina | 2-1 | Once Lobos |
|---|---|---|
| Luis Fuentes 2'; Jorge Molina 26' | | Vladimir Díaz 51' |

Estadio San Sebastián, Pasaquina, La Unión
Referee: Marlon Mejía

Apertura 2013 champions

1st title

=== Individual awards ===
| Hombre GOL | Best Coach Award | Best Goalkeeper Award |
|---|---|---|
| (El Salvador) Levi Martínez; C.D. Chalatenango | (El Salvador) TBD; TBD | (El Salvador) Edwin Jeovany Ávila; C.D. Sonsonate |

== Clausura ==
=== Personnel and sponsoring ===
| Team | Manager^{1} | Chairman | Team captain | Kit Manufacturer | Sponsor |
|---|---|---|---|---|---|
| ADI F.C. | (El Salvador) Estaban Melara | (El Salvador) | (El Salvador) | | |
| C.D. Aspirante | (El Salvador) Joaquín Pérez | (El Salvador) | (El Salvador) | | |
| C.D. Brasilia | (El Salvador) Milton Melendez | (El Salvador) | (El Salvador) | Milan | Ria |
| C.D. Chalatenango | (Honduras) German Perez | (El Salvador) | (El Salvador) | | |
| Ciclon de Golfo | (El Salvador) Omar David Sevilla | (El Salvador) | (El Salvador) | | Ahorre En Aguca De R.L., Caja de Credito La Union |
| El Roble | (El Salvador) Guillermo Navarro | (El Salvador) | (El Salvador) | | |
| C.D. La Asunción | (El Salvador) Edwin Garay | (El Salvador) | (El Salvador) | | |
| C.D. Liberal | (El Salvador) Victor Coreas | (El Salvador) | (El Salvador) | | |
| C.D. Marte Soyapango | (El Salvador) Jorge Calles | (El Salvador) | (El Salvador) | | |
| C.D. Municipal Limeno | (El Salvador) Jose Mario Martinez | (El Salvador) | (El Salvador) | Milan (Jaguar Sportic) | Ria |
| Once Lobos | (El Salvador) Cesar Acevedo | (El Salvador) Juan Duch | (El Salvador) | | Alba, |
| Once Municipal | (El Salvador) Ivan 'Diablo' Ruiz | (El Salvador) | (El Salvador) | | |
| C.D. Pasaquina | (El Salvador) David Ramírez | (El Salvador) | (El Salvador) | | |
| C.D. Platense Municipal Zacatecoluca | (Brazil) Mauro de Oliveira | (El Salvador) | (El Salvador) | | |
| Real Tecleño | (El Salvador) Boris Romero | (El Salvador) William Murillo | (El Salvador) | | |
| C.D. Sonsonate | (Uruguay) Ruben Alonso | (El Salvador) | (El Salvador) | | |
| C.D. Topiltzin | (El Salvador) Roberto Hernández | (El Salvador) | (El Salvador) | | |
| Turín FESA F.C. | (El Salvador) Carlos Recinos | (El Salvador) | (El Salvador) | Milan (Jaguar Sportic) | Herbalife, Digicel |
| C.D. Vendaval | (El Salvador) Carlos Orellana | (El Salvador) | (El Salvador) | | |
| C.D. Guadalupano | (El Salvador) Carlos Romero | (El Salvador) | (El Salvador) | | |

=== Clausura 2013 Group standings ===
==== Grupo Centro Occidente ====
| Pos | Team | Pld | W | D | L | GF | GA | GD | Pts | Qualification | BRA | OLB | RED | OMU | FES | SON | ROB | CHA | VEN | SOY |
|---|---|---|---|---|---|---|---|---|---|---|---|---|---|---|---|---|---|---|---|---|
| 1 | Brasilia | 18 | 9 | 4 | 5 | 25 | 18 | +7 | 31 | Qualification for playoffs | | 1–1 | 4–2 | 1–1 | 2–3 | 2–1 | 1–0 | 3–3 | 0–1 | 0–0 |
| 2 | Once Lobos | 18 | 7 | 8 | 3 | 24 | 15 | +9 | 29 | Qualification for playoffs | 0–2 | | 1–1 | 4–0 | 1–1 | 2–1 | 0–1 | 2–0 | 1–1 | 0–0 |
| 3 | Real Destroyer | 18 | 8 | 5 | 5 | 27 | 24 | +3 | 29 | Qualification for playoffs | 0–1 | 1–1 | | 3–3 | 2–1 | 1–0 | 3–2 | 3–3 | 1–0 | 3–0 |
| 4 | Once Municipal | 18 | 8 | 5 | 5 | 23 | 19 | +4 | 29 | Qualification for playoffs | 1–0 | 2–0 | 1–1 | | 1–0 | 3–2 | 1–3 | 1–0 | 2–0 | 0–0 |
| 5 | Turín FESA | 18 | 7 | 7 | 4 | 21 | 15 | +6 | 28 | | 3–2 | 0–0 | 1–0 | 0–1 | | 0–0 | 1–0 | 2–1 | 3–0 | 0–0 |
| 6 | Sonsonate | 18 | 7 | 4 | 7 | 21 | 22 | −1 | 25 | | 0–2 | 1–1 | 2–1 | 2–0 | 1–0 | | 2–2 | 1–2 | 2–1 | 1–0 |
| 7 | El Roble | 18 | 6 | 4 | 8 | 21 | 23 | −2 | 22 | | 1–0 | 1–1 | 1–2 | 1–2 | 1–3 | 2–3 | | 0–0 | 2–1 | 2–1 |
| 8 | Chalatenango | 18 | 5 | 7 | 6 | 21 | 23 | −2 | 22 | | 0–1 | 1–4 | 0–1 | 1–0 | 1–1 | 2–0 | 1–1 | | 2–1 | 2–0 |
| 9 | Vendaval | 18 | 4 | 4 | 10 | 13 | 28 | −15 | 16 | | 0–1 | 0–4 | 3–1 | 0–3 | 1–1 | 1–1 | 1–0 | 1–1 | | 0–3 |
| 10 | Marte Soyapango | 18 | 2 | 6 | 10 | 8 | 17 | −9 | 12 | | 1–2 | 1–0 | 0–1 | 0–1 | 1–1 | 0–1 | 0–1 | 1–1 | 0–1 | |

==== Grupo Centro Oriente ====
| Pos | Team | Pld | W | D | L | GF | GA | GD | Pts | Qualification | ADI | PAS | PLA | ASP | ASU | MLI | LIB | TOP | GUA | CDG |
|---|---|---|---|---|---|---|---|---|---|---|---|---|---|---|---|---|---|---|---|---|
| 1 | ADI F.C. | 18 | 8 | 4 | 6 | 32 | 31 | +1 | 28 | | | 2–2 | 3–2 | 2–1 | 2–1 | 1–1 | 2–1 | 1–1 | 1–0 | 4–1 |
| 2 | Pasaquina | 18 | 8 | 3 | 7 | 27 | 28 | −1 | 27 | Qualification for playoffs | 3–2 | | 2–1 | 2–4 | 0–2 | 2–0 | 3–0 | 2–0 | 3–2 | 3–1 |
| 3 | Platense | 18 | 7 | 5 | 6 | 25 | 24 | +1 | 26 | Qualification for playoffs | 2–1 | 1–1 | | 1–0 | 2–0 | 1–0 | 2–0 | 0–0 | 3–2 | 2–0 |
| 4 | Aspirante | 18 | 6 | 7 | 5 | 22 | 16 | +6 | 25 | Qualification for playoffs | 1–2 | 4–1 | 2–2 | | 0–1 | 0–0 | 1–1 | 0–1 | 1–0 | 3–2 |
| 5 | La Asunción | 18 | 7 | 4 | 7 | 25 | 19 | +6 | 25 | Qualification for playoffs | 5–0 | 0–1 | 2–2 | 0–0 | | 3–1 | 0–1 | 2–5 | 1–1 | 3–0 |
| 6 | Municipal Limeño | 18 | 6 | 7 | 5 | 19 | 17 | +2 | 25 | | 1–1 | 2–0 | 4–2 | 0–0 | 2–1 | | 1–0 | 4–1 | 0–1 | 1–0 |
| 7 | Liberal | 18 | 7 | 3 | 8 | 15 | 9 | +6 | 24 | | 3–2 | 1–0 | 1–0 | 0–2 | 0–1 | 1–1 | | 0–1 | 2–1 | 1–1 |
| 8 | Topiltzín | 18 | 6 | 6 | 6 | 22 | 24 | −2 | 24 | | 2–5 | 3–2 | 2–0 | 2–1 | 1–2 | 1–1 | 0–1 | | 0–1 | 2–2 |
| 9 | Guadalupano (Note: C.D. Guadalupano bought the spot of C.D. Vista Hermosa for the 2013–14 season.) | 18 | 5 | 7 | 6 | 16 | 14 | +2 | 22 | | 2–0 | 2–0 | 3–1 | 0–0 | 0–0 | 0–0 | 0–1 | 0–0 | | 1–1 |
| 10 | Ciclon de Golfo | 18 | 3 | 8 | 7 | 16 | 7 | +9 | 17 | | 1–2 | 0–0 | 1–1 | 0–0 | 2–1 | 2–0 | 2–1 | 0–0 | 0–0 | |

=== Second stage ===
Quarterfinals
1A | Brasilia | 1 | 3 | 4
4B | La Asunción | 0 | 1 | 1
3A | Real Destroyer | 2 | 2 | 4
2B | Platense Municipal | 1 | 2 | 3
2A | Once Lobos | 1 | 0 | 1 (5)
3B | Aspirante | 1 | 0 | 1 (4)
4A | Once Municipal | 0 | 1 | 1
1B | Pasaquina | 0 | 2 | 2

Semifinals
5 | Brasilia | 0 | 4 | 4
1 | Real Destroyer | 2 | 0 | 2
8 | Once Lobos | 3 | 1 | 4 (5)
3 | Pasaquina | 1 | 3 | 4 (4)

Final
1 | Brasilia | 1 | 3 | 4
3 | 'Once Lobos' | '4' | '2' | '6'

==== Finals ====
===== First leg =====
1 June 2014
11:00 am

| Once Lobos | 4-1 | Brasilia |
|---|---|---|
| Ramón Solís 8'; Roberto Ochoa 12'; Bladimir Díaz 26'; Jhon Polo 84' | | Antonio Casco 33' |

Estadio Once Lobos – Chalchuapa

===== Second leg =====
June 9, 2014
15:00 UTC-6

| Brasilia | 3-2 | Once Lobos |
|---|---|---|
| Fredy González 9' & 93'; Raúl González 50' | | Ramón Solís 25'; Roberto Ochoa 29' |

Referee: TBD

Clausura 2014 champions

3rd title

=== Individual awards ===
| Hombre GOL | Best Coach Award | Best Goalkeeper Award |
|---|---|---|
| (El Salvador) José Arsenio Rodríguez; ADI F.C. | (El Salvador) TBD; TBD | (El Salvador) Daniel Gutiérrez; C.D. Guadalupano |

== Aggregate table ==
=== Grupo Centro Oriente ===
| Pos | Team | Pld | W | D | L | GF | GA | GD | Pts | Relegation |
|---|---|---|---|---|---|---|---|---|---|---|
| 1 | Pasaquina FC | 36 | 17 | 7 | 12 | 57 | 46 | +11 | 58 | |
| 2 | Aspirante | 36 | 14 | 14 | 8 | 41 | 27 | +14 | 56 | |
| 3 | Topiltzín | 36 | 15 | 11 | 10 | 49 | 46 | +3 | 56 | |
| 4 | C.D. La Asunción | 36 | 15 | 9 | 12 | 54 | 43 | +11 | 54 | |
| 5 | Liberal | 36 | 15 | 9 | 12 | 40 | 39 | +1 | 54 | |
| 6 | Municipal Limeno | 36 | 12 | 14 | 10 | 43 | 37 | +6 | 50 | |
| 7 | C.D. Platense Municipal Zacatecoluca | 36 | 11 | 9 | 16 | 39 | 47 | −8 | 42 | |
| 8 | C.D. Guadalupano | 36 | 10 | 11 | 15 | 38 | 40 | −2 | 41 | |
| 9 | Ciclon de Golfo | 36 | 10 | 11 | 15 | 31 | 44 | −13 | 41 | |
| 10 | ADI F.C. (R) | 36 | 10 | 7 | 19 | 55 | 78 | −23 | 37 | Relegation to Tercera División |

(R) Relegated

=== Grupo Centro Occidente ===
| Pos | Team | Pld | W | D | L | GF | GA | GD | Pts | Relegation |
|---|---|---|---|---|---|---|---|---|---|---|
| 1 | Once Lobos | 36 | 16 | 12 | 8 | 47 | 29 | +18 | 60 | |
| 2 | Turin FESA | 36 | 15 | 13 | 8 | 47 | 34 | +13 | 58 | |
| 3 | Brasilia | 36 | 17 | 7 | 12 | 54 | 47 | +7 | 58 | |
| 4 | Sonsonate | 36 | 16 | 9 | 11 | 48 | 37 | +11 | 57 | |
| 5 | El Roble | 36 | 14 | 7 | 15 | 58 | 52 | +6 | 49 | |
| 6 | Chalatenango | 36 | 12 | 13 | 11 | 48 | 48 | 0 | 49 | |
| 7 | Once Municipal | 36 | 13 | 7 | 16 | 43 | 54 | −11 | 46 | |
| 8 | Real Tecleno | 36 | 11 | 9 | 16 | 50 | 69 | −19 | 42 | |
| 9 | Vendaval | 36 | 10 | 9 | 17 | 34 | 50 | −16 | 39 | |
| 10 | Marte Soyapango (R) | 36 | 9 | 8 | 19 | 33 | 42 | −9 | 35 | Relegation to Tercera División |

(R) Relegated
