= 2011–12 Segunda División de Fútbol Salvadoreño =

Segunda División de Fútbol Salvadoreño
- Season: 2011–12
- Champions: Apertura: Titán Clausura: Santa Tecla
- Promoted: Santa Tecla
- Relegated: Arcense Topiltzín
- Matches: 360
- Goals: 997 (2.77 per match)

The 2011–12 season (officially known as Liga de Plata) was El Salvador's Segunda División de Fútbol Salvadoreño. The season was split into two championships Apertura 2011 and Clausura 2012. The champions of the Apertura and Clausura play the direct promotion playoff every year. The winner of that series ascends to Primera División de Fútbol de El Salvador.

== Promotion and relegation 2011–2012 season ==
Teams promoted to Primera División de Fútbol Profesional - Apertura 2011

- Juventud Independiente

Teams relegated to Segunda División de Fútbol Salvadoreño - Apertura 2011

- Atlético Balboa

Teams relegated to Tercera División de Fútbol Profesional - Apertura 2011

- Liberal I.R.
- Alacranes Del Norte (stripped of their license after failure of payment to the league)

Teams promoted from Tercera Division De Fútbol Profesional - Apertura 2011

- Isidro Metapán C
- La Asunción

Teams that failed to register for the Apertura 2011

- Vendaval
- Atlético Balboa

== Teams ==
Location of Segunda División de Fútbol Salvadoreño teams in 2011–2012 season. Blue: Grupo Centro Occidente.
Location of Segunda División de Fútbol Salvadoreño teams in 2011–2012 season. Red: Grupo Centro Oriente.

The league currently consists of the following 22 teams:

Grupo Centro Occidente
Team	Home city	Stadium
Arcense	Ciudad Arce, La Libertad	Wismar Stadion
Brasilia	Suchitoto, Cuscatlán	Estadio Municipal de Suchitoto
Chalatenango	Chalatenango, Chalatenango	Estadio José Gregorio Martínez
Fuerte Aguilares	Aguilares, San Salvador	Complejo Municipal de Aguilares
Isidro Metapán C	Metapán Santa Ana	Estadio Jorge Calero Suárez
Marte Soyapango	Soyapango, San Salvador	Estadio Jorgito Melendez
Once Lobos	Chalchuapa, Santa Ana	Estadio Cesar Hernández
Platense	Zacatecoluca, La Paz	Estadio Antonio Toledo Valle
Santa Tecla	Santa Tecla, La Libertad	Estadio Las Delicias de Santa Tecla
Titán	Texistepeque, Santa Ana	Cancha Sandoval

Grupo Centro Oriente
Team	Home city	Stadium
ADI	Intipucá, La Union	Estadio de Intipucá
Aspirante	Jucuapa, Usulután	Estadio Municipal de Jucuapa
La Asunción	Anamorós	Estadio Jose Eliseo Reyes
Dragón	San Miguel, San Miguel	Juan Francisco Barraza
El Roble	Ilobasco, Cabañas	Estadio Mauricio Vides
Liberal	Quelepa, San Miguel	Estadio Municipal De Quelapa
Municipal Limeño	Santa Rosa de Lima, La Union	Estadio Jose Ramon Flores
Pasaquina	Santa Rosa, La Union	Estadio Ramón Flores Berrios
Topiltzín	Jiquilisco, Usulután	Estadio Jiquilisco
Santa María	Usulután El Salvador	Cancha Universidad Gerardo Barrios

== Apertura 2011 ==
Apertura
- Season: Apertura 2011
- Champions: Titán
- Matches: 180
- Goals: 533 (2.96 per match)
- Top goalscorer: Fredy González
- Biggest home win: Brasilia 8-0 Isidro Metapán C (November 13, 2011)
- Biggest away win: Topiltzín 1-6 Dragón (October 9, 2011)
- Highest scoring: Brasilia 8-0 Isidro Metapán C (November 13, 2011)

=== Personnel and sponsoring ===
Team	Manager^{1}	Chairman	Team captain	Kit manufacturer	Sponsor
ADI	(El Salvador) Jose Mario Martinez	(El Salvador)	(El Salvador)		
Aspirante	(El Salvador) Carlos Mario Joya Valencia	(El Salvador)	(El Salvador)		
Arcense	(El Salvador)	(El Salvador)	(El Salvador)		
Brasilia	(El Salvador) Milton Melendez	(El Salvador)	(El Salvador)		
Chalatenango	(El Salvador)	(El Salvador)	(El Salvador)		
Dragón	(El Salvador) Marvin Benitez	(El Salvador)	(El Salvador)		
El Roble	(El Salvador) Carlos Meléndez	(El Salvador)	(El Salvador)		
Fuerte Aguilares	(El Salvador)	(El Salvador)	(El Salvador)		
Isidro Metapán C	(El Salvador)	(El Salvador)	(El Salvador)		
La Asunción	(El Salvador)	(El Salvador)	(El Salvador)		
Liberal	(El Salvador)	(El Salvador)	(El Salvador)		
Marte Soyapango	(El Salvador) Guillermo Rivera	(El Salvador)	(El Salvador)		
Municipal Limeño	(El Salvador)	(El Salvador)	(El Salvador)		
Once Lobos	(El Salvador) Cesar Acevedo	(El Salvador)	(El Salvador)		
Pasaquina	(El Salvador)	(El Salvador)	(El Salvador)		
Platense	(El Salvador)	(El Salvador)	(El Salvador)		
Santa María	(El Salvador) Israel Cruz	(El Salvador)	(El Salvador)		
Santa Tecla	(Uruguay) Ruben Alonso	(El Salvador)	(El Salvador)		
Titán	(El Salvador) Antonio Garcia Prieto	(El Salvador)	(El Salvador)		
Topiltzín	(El Salvador)	(El Salvador)	(El Salvador)		

=== Overall table ===
Pos	Team	Pld	W	D	L	GF	GA	GD	Pts
1	Santa Tecla	18	11	4	3	27	14	+13	37
2	Dragón	18	10	4	4	34	20	+14	34
3	Marte Soyapango	18	10	2	6	25	16	+9	32
4	Titán (C)	18	9	4	5	25	16	+9	31
5	Once Lobos	18	8	6	4	29	21	+8	30
6	El Roble	18	7	7	4	25	23	+2	28
7	Santa María	18	7	6	5	26	24	+2	27
8	Aspirante	18	6	8	4	24	19	+5	26
9	Municipal Limeño	18	7	5	6	20	15	+5	26
10	Isidro Metapán C	18	6	6	6	27	32	−5	24
11	Brasilia	18	6	5	7	30	24	+6	23
12	La Asunción	18	5	7	6	22	21	+1	22
13	ADI	18	6	4	8	25	26	−1	22
14	Fuerte Aguilares	18	5	6	7	31	29	+2	21
15	Pasaquina	18	6	3	9	24	29	−5	21
16	Liberal	18	5	6	7	27	34	−7	21
17	Arcense	18	4	6	8	19	33	−14	18
18	Topiltzín	18	5	2	11	26	42	−16	17
19	Platense	18	3	7	8	20	26	−6	16
20	Chalatenango	18	2	6	10	16	38	−22	12

Source: elgrafico.com
Rules for classification: 1) points; 2) goal difference; 3) number of goals scored.
(C) Champions

==== Group standings ====
===== Grupo Centro Occidente =====
Pos	Team	Pld	W	D	L	GF	GA	GD	Pts	Qualification
1	Santa Tecla	18	11	4	3	27	14	+13	37	Qualification for playoffs
2	Marte Soyapango	18	10	2	6	25	16	+9	32	Qualification for playoffs
3	Titán	18	9	4	5	25	16	+9	31	Qualification for playoffs
4	Once Lobos	18	8	6	4	29	21	+8	30	Qualification for playoffs
5	Isidro Metapán C	18	6	6	6	27	32	−5	24	
6	Brasilia	18	6	5	7	30	24	+6	23	
7	Fuerte Aguilares	18	5	6	7	31	29	+2	21	
8	Arcense	18	4	6	8	19	33	−14	18	
9	Platense	18	3	7	8	20	26	−6	16	
10	Chalatenango	18	2	6	10	16	38	−22	12	

Home \ Away	ARC	BRA	CHA	AGU	MET	SOY	OLB	PLA	STE	TIN
Arcense		1–2	0–0	0–0	1–1	2–4	3–2	2–2	0–1	1–0
Brasilia	1–1		3–3	2–2	8–0	2–0	3–1	1–1	0–2	3–1
Chalatenango	1–3	0–0		1–1	3–1	0–4	0–1	3–2	0–1	0–0
Fuerte Aguilares	5–1	1–2	3–0		2–1	1–0	1–2	1–2	1–2	1–4
Isidro Metapán C	4–0	3–1	5–2	3–2		0–3	2–1	2–1	1–2	0–0
Marte Soyapango	1–2	2–1	3–2	1–0	2–0		0–1	1–0	2–1	1–0
Once Lobos	3–0	2–0	1–0	3–3	0–2	1–1		3–2	1–1	4–1
Platense	1–1	2–1	0–0	2–2	1–1	2–1	1–1		1–2	0–1
Santa Tecla	2–1	2–1	5–0	0–2	2–2	0–0	1–1	1–0		2–0
Titán	3–0	2–1	5–1	2–2	0–0	1–0	1–0	2–0	1–0	

Legend: Blue = home team win; Yellow = draw; Red = away team win.

===== Grupo Centro Oriente =====
Pos	Team	Pld	W	D	L	GF	GA	GD	Pts	Qualification
1	Dragón	18	10	4	4	34	20	+14	34	Qualification for playoffs
2	El Roble	18	7	7	4	25	23	+2	28	Qualification for playoffs
3	Santa María	18	7	6	5	26	24	+2	27	Qualification for playoffs
4	Aspirante	18	6	8	4	24	19	+5	26	Qualification for playoffs
5	Municipal Limeño	18	7	5	6	20	15	+5	26	
6	La Asunción	18	5	7	6	22	21	+1	22	
7	ADI	18	6	4	8	25	26	−1	22	
8	Pasaquina	18	6	3	9	24	29	−5	21	
9	Liberal	18	5	6	7	27	34	−7	21	
10	Topiltzín	18	5	2	11	26	42	−16	17	

Home \ Away	ADI	ASP	DRA	ROB	ASU	LIB	MLI	PAS	MAR	TOP
ADI F.C.		2–1	2–1	3–3	1–0	2–1	1–0	1–2	0–1	3–1
Aspirante	2–0		1–2	1–0	2–2	2–2	2–0	2–1	2–2	1–0
Dragón	2–1	1–1		2–3	1–2	5–1	1–0	1–2	1–2	2–1
El Roble	2–2	0–1	2–4		1–0	2–2	0–0	2–1	1–0	1–0
La Asunción	1–1	0–0	0–0	1–1		3–3	0–1	3–0	3–2	2–1
Liberal	1–1	1–0	0–1	2–0	1–3		2–2	0–4	2–1	4–2
Municipal Limeño	1–0	1–0	1–2	1–1	2–0	1–2		2–0	1–1	3–0
Pasaquina	1–3	2–2	0–0	1–2	3–2	1–0	0–2		2–1	2–1
Santa María	2–1	1–1	1–1	1–1	1–0	0–2	1–0	2–1		4–3
Topiltzín	3–2	2–2	1–6	1–3	3–2	2–1	2–2	3–2	2–1	

Legend: Blue = home team win; Yellow = draw; Red = away team win.

=== Final phase ===
Quarterfinals
1	Santa Tecla	0	1	1(5)
8	Aspirante	1	0	1(3)
3	Marte Soyapango	1	1	2
6	El Roble	0	1	1
2	Dragón	0	2	2
5	Once Lobos	1	0	1
7	Titán	0	4	4
4	Santa María	0	0	0

Semifinals
8	Aspirante	0	2	2
3	Marte Soyapango	2	2	4
2	Dragón	0	1	1
7	Titán	2	0	2

Finals
3	Marte Soyapango
7	Titán

=== Quarterfinals ===
==== First leg ====
November 20, 2011
00:00 UTC-6

Aspirante	1–0	Santa Tecla
	Report

Estadio Municipal de Jucuapa, Jucuapa

November 20, 2011
00:00 UTC-6

Once Lobos	1–0	Dragón
	Report

Estadio Cesar Hernández, Chalchuapa

November 20, 2011
00:00 UTC-6

Marte Soyapango	1–0	El Roble
	Report

Estadio Jorgito Melendez, Soyapango

November 20, 2011
00:00 UTC-6

Santa María	0–0	Titán
	Report

Cancha Universidad Gerardo Barrios, Usulután

==== Second leg ====
November 27, 2011
00:00 UTC-6

Santa Tecla	1–0 (3)–(5)	Aspirante
Ever Morales 1'	Report

Estadio Las Delicias de Santa Tecla, Santa Tecla

November 27, 2011
00:00 UTC-6

Dragón	2–0	Once Lobos
Francisco Valladares 36' ((P)); Aurelio Vásquez 42'	Report

Juan Francisco Barraza, San Miguel

November 27, 2011
00:00 UTC-6

El Roble	1–1	Marte Soyapango
Luis Amaya 45'	Report	Alfredo Durán 68'

Estadio Mauricio Vides, Ilobasco

November 27, 2011
00:00 UTC-6

Titán	4–0	Santa María
Jesús Barrios 27'; Víctor Barrera 51'; Francisco Duarte 55'; Jhony Valle 86'	Report

Cancha Sandoval, Texistepeque

=== Semi-finals ===
==== First leg ====
December 4, 2011
00:00 UTC-6

Marte Soyapango	2 – 0	Aspirante
Carlos Caldero 44'; Oscar Serpas 89'	Report

Estadio Jorgito Melendez, Soyapango

December 4, 2011
00:00 UTC-6

Titán	2 – 0	Dragón
Victor Barrera 25'; Omar Flores 51'	Report

Cancha Sandoval, Texistepeque

==== Second leg ====
December 11, 2011
UTC-6 14:30

Aspirante	2 – 2	Marte Soyapango
Elmer Araniva 18'; Francisco Zelaya 54'		Carlos Durán 9'; Giovanni Benítez 45'

Estadio Municipal de Jucuapa, Jucuapa

December 11, 2011
UTC-6 14:30

Dragón	1 – 0	Titán
Aurelio Vásquez 77'

Estadio Juan Francisco Barraza, San Miguel

=== Finals ===
December 17, 2011
14:30 UTC-6

Marte Soyapango	0 – 1	Titán
	Report	Víctor Barrera 60'

Estadio Cuscatlán, San Salvador
Referee: Jaime Herrera

Marte Soyapango:
GK	(El Salvador) Ronald Pineda
(El Salvador) Rodrigo Martínez
(El Salvador) Rodrigo Rivera
(El Salvador) Óscar Motoa
(El Salvador) Ernesto Ponce	(substituted off) 59'
(El Salvador) William Barrios
(El Salvador) Carlos Durán	(substituted off) 8'
(El Salvador) Geovanny Rivera	Booked
(El Salvador) Mauricio Domínguez	(substituted off) 75'
(El Salvador) Carlos Calderón
(El Salvador) Juan Bonilla
Substitutes:
(El Salvador) L. Linares	(substituted in) 8'
(El Salvador) C. Chávez	(substituted in) 59'
(El Salvador) J. Pinedal	(substituted in) 75'
Manager:
(El Salvador) Guillermo Rivera

Titán:
GK	1	(El Salvador) Enllelbert Gonzalez
DF	22	(El Salvador) Víctor Cerritos	Booked
DF		(El Salvador) Erick Ávalos
DF		(El Salvador) Alusno Ramírez
MF	6	(El Salvador) Marvin Menéndez	(substituted off) 78'
MF	11	(El Salvador) Erick Orellana	(substituted off) 45'
MF		(El Salvador) Wilfredo Rojas
MF	8	(El Salvador) Francisco Duarte	(substituted off) 87'
MF		(El Salvador) Jolvin Duarte
FW	25	(El Salvador) Jesús Barrios
FW	9	(Panama) Víctor Barrera
Substitutes:
FW	14	(El Salvador) Mario Gutiérrez		(substituted in) 45'
MF	10	(El Salvador) Johnny Valle		(substituted in) 78'
		(El Salvador) W. Avalos		(substituted in) 87' (yellow card)
Manager:
(El Salvador) Antonio García Prieto				(red card) 67'

Apertura 2011 champions
C.D. Titán
2nd title

=== Individual awards ===
Hombre GOL	Best Goalkeeper Award
(El Salvador) TBD; TBD	(El Salvador) TBD; TBD

== Clausura 2012 ==
Clausura
- Season: Clausura 2012
- Champions: Santa Tecla
- Matches: 180
- Goals: 464 (2.58 per match)
- Biggest home win: Once Lobos 6-3 Isidro Metapán C (April 4, 2012); Titán 5-1 Arcense (April 15, 2012)
- Biggest away win: La Asunción 1-3 Liberal (January 29, 2012); Santa María 1-3 La Asunción (February 5, 2012); Aspirante 1-3 La Asunción (April 22, 2012)
- Highest scoring: Once Lobos 6-3 Isidro Metapán C (April 4, 2012)

=== Personnel and sponsoring ===
Team	Manager^{1}	Chairman	Team captain	Kit manufacturer	Sponsor
ADI	(El Salvador)	(El Salvador)	(El Salvador)		
Aspirante	(El Salvador)	(El Salvador)	(El Salvador)		
Arcense	(El Salvador)	(El Salvador)	(El Salvador)		
Brasilia	(El Salvador) Milton Meléndez	(El Salvador)	(El Salvador)		
Chalatenango-Vendaval	(El Salvador) Marcos Portillo	(El Salvador)	(El Salvador)		
Dragón	(El Salvador)	(El Salvador)	(El Salvador)		
El Roble	(El Salvador)	(El Salvador)	(El Salvador)		
Fuerte Aguilares	(El Salvador)	(El Salvador)	(El Salvador)		
Isidro Metapán C	(El Salvador)	(El Salvador)	(El Salvador)		
La Asunción	(El Salvador)	(El Salvador)	(El Salvador)		
Liberal	(El Salvador)	(El Salvador)	(El Salvador)		
Marte Soyapango	(El Salvador)	(El Salvador)	(El Salvador)		
Municipal Limeño	(El Salvador) Carlos Romero	(El Salvador)	(El Salvador)		
Once Lobos	(El Salvador) Cesar Acevedo	(El Salvador)	(El Salvador)		
Pasaquina	(El Salvador)	(El Salvador)	(El Salvador)		
Platense	(El Salvador)	(El Salvador)	(El Salvador)		
Santa María	(El Salvador)	(El Salvador)	(El Salvador)		
Santa Tecla	(El Salvador) Edgar Henriquez	(El Salvador)	(El Salvador)		
Titán	(El Salvador) Antonio García Prieto	(El Salvador)	(El Salvador)		
Topiltzín	(El Salvador)	(El Salvador)	(El Salvador)		

=== Overall table ===
Pos	Team	Pld	W	D	L	GF	GA	GD	Pts
1	Brasilia	18	11	4	3	29	17	+12	37
2	Aspirante	18	10	5	3	25	19	+6	35
3	Santa Tecla	18	9	5	4	33	24	+9	32
4	Chalatenango	18	8	6	4	18	13	+5	30
5	Pasaquina	18	8	4	6	27	21	+6	28
6	Platense	18	8	4	6	21	19	+2	28
7	Dragón	18	7	6	5	24	20	+4	27
8	El Roble	18	7	6	5	25	22	+3	27
9	Titán	18	6	5	7	25	21	+4	23
10	Topiltzín	18	5	8	5	19	22	−3	23
11	Marte Soyapango	18	6	5	7	16	19	−3	23
12	ADI	18	6	5	7	11	15	−4	23
13	Once Lobos	18	7	1	10	22	26	−4	22
14	Liberal	18	7	1	10	29	32	−3	22
15	La Asunción	18	5	5	8	24	30	−6	20
16	Isidro Metapán C	18	5	5	8	26	34	−8	20
17	Municipal Limeño	18	3	10	5	21	19	+2	19
18	Arcense	18	4	5	9	26	37	−11	17
19	Santa María	18	2	10	6	23	28	−5	16
20	Fuerte Aguilares	18	3	6	9	21	27	−6	15

Updated to match(es) played on April 22, 2012. Source: Elgrafico.com
Rules for classification: 1) points; 2) goal difference; 3) number of goals scored.

==== Group standings ====
===== Grupo Centro Occidente =====
Pos	Team	Pld	W	D	L	GF	GA	GD	Pts	Qualification
1	Brasilia	18	11	4	3	29	17	+12	37	Qualification for playoffs
2	Santa Tecla	18	9	5	4	33	24	+9	32	Qualification for playoffs
3	Chalatenango	18	8	6	4	18	13	+5	30	Qualification for playoffs
4	Platense	18	8	4	6	21	19	+2	28	Qualification for playoffs
5	Titán	18	6	5	7	25	21	+4	23	
6	Marte Soyapango	18	6	5	7	16	19	−3	23	
7	Once Lobos	18	7	1	10	22	26	−4	22	
8	Isidro Metapán C	18	5	5	8	26	34	−8	20	
9	Arcense	18	4	5	9	26	37	−11	17	
10	Fuerte Aguilares	18	3	6	9	21	27	−6	15	

Home \ Away	ARC	BRA	CHA	AGU	MET	SOY	OLB	PLA	STE	TIN
Arcense		2–3	1–2	3–3	2–2	4–2	2–1	2–3	1–1	1–1
Brasilia	3–0		1–0	1–0	2–3	2–1	1–0	1–0	3–3	2–1
Chalatenango	0–1	0–1		0–0	0–0	2–2	2–0	1–0	2–2	3–2
Fuerte Aguilares	1–1	0–2	1–0		4–0	2–2	1–2	2–0	1–2	2–2
Isidro Metapán C	4–1	1–1	1–2	2–2		1–1	2–1	0–2	4–2	2–1
Marte Soyapango	1–0	1–0	1–2	1–0	1–0		2–1	0–0	0–0	0–1
Once Lobos	1–0	1–1	0–1	1–0	6–3	1–0		3–2	1–2	1–0
Platense	3–2	2–2	0–0	3–1	1–0	0–1	2–1		1–0	1–0
Santa Tecla	1–2	2–1	0–1	4–1	2–1	1–0	4–1	2–0		2–2
Titán	5–1	0–2	0–0	1–0	3–0	2–0	1–0	1–1	2–3	

Legend: Blue = home team win; Yellow = draw; Red = away team win.

===== Grupo Centro Oriente =====
Pos	Team	Pld	W	D	L	GF	GA	GD	Pts	Qualification
1	Aspirante	18	10	5	3	25	19	+6	35	Qualification for playoffs
2	Pasaquina	18	8	4	6	27	21	+6	28	Qualification for playoffs
3	Dragón	18	7	6	5	24	20	+4	27	Qualification for playoffs
4	El Roble	18	7	6	5	25	22	+3	27	Qualification for playoffs
5	Topiltzín	18	5	8	5	19	22	−3	23	
6	ADI	18	6	5	7	11	15	−4	23	
7	Liberal	18	7	1	10	29	32	−3	22	
8	La Asunción	18	5	5	8	24	30	−6	20	
9	Municipal Limeño	18	3	10	5	21	19	+2	19	
10	Santa María	18	2	10	6	23	28	−5	16	

Home \ Away	ADI	ASP	DRA	ROB	ASU	LIB	MLI	PAS	MAR	TOP
ADI F.C.		0–0	2–1	0–1	1–0	1–2	0–0	0–1	1–1	1–0
Aspirante	1–0		1–2	1–0	1–3	2–1	1–0	4–1	1–0	1–1
Dragón	0–1	2–2		0–2	4–1	2–1	2–1	3–2	1–1	2–0
El Roble	0–1	2–4	1–0		3–2	2–1	1–1	1–0	2–2	3–1
La Asunción	0–0	1–2	1–0	1–1		1–3	2–2	2–2	0–2	0–1
Liberal	0–1	1–2	1–2	3–2	0–1		3–2	1–0	3–1	4–2
Municipal Limeño	4–0	0–0	1–1	0–0	2–2	3–1		1–2	1–1	0–1
Pasaquina	1–0	4–0	1–1	1–0	1–2	3–0	0–1		4–2	2–2
Santa María	2–2	0–1	1–1	2–2	1–3	4–4	1–1	0–1		2–0
Topiltzín	1–0	1–1	0–0	2–2	4–2	1–0	1–1	1–1	0–0	

Legend: Blue = home team win; Yellow = draw; Red = away team win.

=== Final phase ===
Quarterfinals
[1] Brasilia	0	1	1
4	[4] El Roble	0	0	0
3	[3] Chalatenango	2	1	3
2	[2] Pasaquina	1	0	1
2	[2] Santa Tecla	2	2	4
3	[3] Dragón	2	0	2
4	[4] Platense (p)	1	0	1 (5)
1	[1] Aspirante	1	0	1 (4)

Semifinals
1	[1] Brasilia	1	4	5
3	[3] Chalatenango	0	0	0
2	[2] Santa Tecla	0	3	3
4	[4] Platense	0	0	0

Finals
1	[1] Brasilia
2	[2] Santa Tecla (a.e.t.)

==== Quarterfinals ====
===== First leg =====
April 28, 2012
13:00 UTC-6

El Roble	0–0	Brasilia
	Report

Estadio Mauricio Vides, Ilobasco

April 29, 2012
13:00 UTC-6

Dragón	2–2	Santa Tecla
Óscar Fuentes 49'; Óscar Portillo 51'	Report	Pedro Reyes 63' (p); Roberto González 83'

Estadio Francisco Barraza, San Miguel

April 29, 2012
13:00 UTC-6

Chalatenango	2–1	Pasaquina
Raúl González 43'; Juan Carlos Martinez 80'	Report	Tony García 31'

Estadio Joaquin Gutierrez, Apopa

April 29, 2012
13:00 UTC-6

Platense	1–1	Aspirante
Carlos Hernández 90'	Report	Selvin Zelaya 69'

Estadio Antonio Toledo Valle, Zacatecoluca

===== Second leg =====
May 5, 2012
13:00 UTC-6

Brasilisa	1–0 (a.e.t.)	El Roble
Reynaldo Cruz 90'	Report

Estadio Municipal de Suchitoto, Suchitoto

Brasilia won 1-0 on aggregate.

May 5, 2012
13:00 UTC-6

Santa Tecla	2–0	Dragón
Roberto González 12'; Pedro Reyes 39'	Report

Estadio Las Delicias, Santa Tecla

Santa Tecla won 4-2 on aggregate.

May 5, 2012
13:00 UTC-6

Pasaquina	0–1	Chalatenango
	Report	Isaac Portillo 14'

Estadio Jose Ramon Flores, Santa Rosa de Lima

Chalatenango won 3-1 on aggregate.

May 5, 2012
13:00 UTC-6

Aspirante	0–0 (a.e.t.)	Platense
	Report
Penalties
José Castillo (penalty scored); René Rodríguez (penalty scored); Franklin Ventura (penalty scored); Dennis Ordóñez (penalty scored); José Cerna (penalty scored)	5–4	(penalty scored) Selvin Zelaya; (penalty scored) Èlmer Araniva; (penalty scored) Ludwin Rivera; (penalty scored) Juan José Ferrara; (penalty missed) Dennis Chévez

Estadio Municipal de Jucuapa, Jucuapa

1-1 on aggregate. Platense won 5-4 on penalties.

==== Semi-finals ====
===== First leg =====
April 13, 2012
13:00 UTC-6

Chalatenango	0–1	Brasilia
	Report	Fredy González 88'

Estadio Joaquin Gutierrez, Apopa

April 13, 2012
13:00 UTC-6

Platense	0–0	Santa Tecla
	Report

Estadio Antonio Toledo Valle, Zacatecoluca

===== Second leg =====
April 20, 2012
13:00 UTC-6

Brasilia	4–0	Chalatenango
Juan Carlos Zamora 11' (pen.), 55'; Juan Menjivar 32'; Fredy González 90+1'	Report

Estadio Municipal de Suchitoto, Suchitoto

Brasilia won 5-0 on aggregate.

April 19, 2012
13:00 UTC-6

Santa Tecla	3–0	Platense
Roberto González 1', 56', 75'	Report

Estadio Las Delicias, Santa Tecla

Santa Tecla won 3-0 on aggregate.

==== Finals ====
May 27, 2012
2:30 UTC-6

Santa Tecla	2–1	Brasilia
William Mancía 43'; Raúl Castellón 106'	Report	Walter Casco 77'

Estadio Cuscatlan, San Salvador
Referee: German Martínez

Santa Tecla:
GK	1	(El Salvador) Rafael Lucha
DF	22	(El Salvador) Julio Bernal
DF	3	(Colombia) Wilson Sánchez
DF	5	(El Salvador) Pedro Reyes
DF	6	(El Salvador) Juan Alfaro
MF	8	(El Salvador) Gustavo Guevara	Booked
MF	7	(El Salvador) Raúl Castellón	Booked
MF	15	(El Salvador) Rafael Acosta	(substituted off) 60'
FW	9	(El Salvador) William Maldonado	(substituted off) 68' (yellow card)
FW	11	(El Salvador) William Bonilla	(substituted off) 77'
FW	20	(El Salvador) Roberto González
Substitutes:
	25	(El Salvador) Héctor Amaya	(substituted in) 60'
		(El Salvador) J. Umaña	(substituted in) 68' (yellow card)
		(El Salvador) N. Baires	(substituted in) 77' (yellow card)
Manager:
(El Salvador) Edgar Henriquez

Brasilia:
GK	25	(El Salvador) Álex Sura
DF	14	(El Salvador) Reynaldo Cruz
DF	8	(El Salvador) Iván Mancilla
DF	4	(El Salvador) Wilmer Meléndez	(substituted off) 110'
DF	12	(El Salvador) Walter Casco
MF	27	(El Salvador) Iván Menjívar	Booked
MF	5	(El Salvador) Henry Reyes	Booked
MF		(El Salvador) Francisco Recinos	Booked
MF		(El Salvador) Jonathan Guardado	(substituted off) 56'
MF	16	(El Salvador) Juan Carlos Zamora	(substituted off) 67' (yellow card)
FW	9	(El Salvador) Fredy González
Substitutes:
		(El Salvador) Josué Guardado	(substituted in) 56'
		(El Salvador) André León	(substituted in) 67'
		(El Salvador) W. Chicas	(substituted in) 110'
Manager:
(El Salvador) Milton Meléndez

Clausura 2012 champions
Santa Tecla
1st title

=== Individual awards ===
Hombre GOL	Best Goalkeeper Award
(El Salvador) Roberto Gonzales; Santa Tecla F.C.	(El Salvador) Juan José Cruz Trinidad; Chalatenango-Vendaval

== Aggregate season ==
Grupo Centro Occidente
Pos	Team	Pld	W	D	L	GF	GA	GD	Pts	Promotion or relegation
1	Santa Tecla (C, O, P)	36	20	9	7	60	38	+22	69	Promotion to Primera División de Fútbol de El Salvador
2	Brasilia	36	17	9	10	59	41	+18	60	
3	Marte Soyapango	36	16	7	13	36	31	+5	55	
4	Titán (C)	36	15	9	12	50	37	+13	54	
5	Once Lobos	36	15	7	14	51	47	+4	52	
6	Platense	36	11	11	14	41	45	−4	44	
7	Isidro Metapán C	36	11	11	14	53	66	−13	44	
8	Chalatenango	36	10	12	14	34	51	−17	42	
9	Fuerte Aguilares	36	8	12	16	52	56	−4	36	
10	Arcense (R)	36	8	11	17	45	70	−25	35	Relegation to Tercera División

Updated to match(es) played on April 22, 2012. Source: Elgrafico.com
Rules for classification: 1) points; 2) goal difference; 3) number of goals scored.
(C) Champions; (O) Play-off winners; (P) Promoted; (R) Relegated

Grupo Centro Oriente
Pos	Team	Pld	W	D	L	GF	GA	GD	Pts	Promotion or relegation
1	Dragón	36	17	10	9	58	40	+18	61	
2	Aspirante	36	16	13	7	49	38	+11	61	
3	El Roble	36	14	13	9	50	45	+5	55	
4	Pasaquina	36	14	7	15	51	50	+1	49	
5	Municipal Limeño	36	10	15	11	41	34	+7	45	
6	ADI	36	12	9	15	36	41	−5	45	
7	Santa María	36	9	16	11	49	52	−3	43	
8	Liberal	36	12	7	17	56	66	−10	43	
9	La Asunción	36	10	12	14	46	51	−5	42	
10	Topiltzín (R)	36	10	10	16	45	64	−19	40	Relegation to Tercera División

Updated to match(es) played on April 22, 2012. Source: Elgrafico.com
Rules for classification: 1) points; 2) goal difference; 3) number of goals scored.
(R) Relegated

=== Promotion playoffs ===
June 3, 2012
14:30 UTC-6

Titán	1–2	Santa Tecla
Yony Valle 60'	Report	William Maldonado 29'; Roberto González 41'

Estadio Cuscatlan, San Salvador
Referee: Elmer Martinez
