= 2014–15 Segunda División de Fútbol Salvadoreño =

Segunda División de Fútbol Salvadoreño
- Season: 2014–15
- Champions: Apertura: C.D. Guadalupano, Clausura: Real Destroyer
- Promoted: Real Destroyer
- Relegated: Brasilia (Group A), C.D. Liberal (Group B)

The 2014–15 season (officially known as Liga de Plata and also as Torneo Luis Baltazar Ramírez) will be El Salvador's Segunda División de Fútbol Salvadoreño The season will be split into two championships Apertura 2014 and Clausura 2015. The champions of the Apertura and Clausura play the direct promotion playoff every year. The winner of that series ascends to Primera División de Fútbol de El Salvador.

== Promotion and relegation 2013–2014 season ==
Teams promoted to Primera División de Fútbol Profesional - Apertura 2014

- Pasaquina

Teams relegated to Segunda División de Fútbol Salvadoreño - Apertura 2014

- Firpo

Teams relegated to Tercera División de Fútbol Profesional - Apertura 2014

- Marte Soyapango (Later bought the spot of Turin FESA)
- ADI

Teams promoted from Tercera Division De Fútbol Profesional - Apertura 2014

- Atlético Comalapa
- C.D. Audaz

Teams that failed to register for the Apertura 2014

- Turin FESA (Sold their spot to Marte Soyapango)

== Teams ==
Team	Location	Stadium	Capacity
Atlético Comalapa	Chalatenango, Chalatenango	Estadio José Gregorio Martínez	
C.D. Aspirante	Jucuapa, Usulután	Estadio Municipal de Jucuapa	
Audaz	Apastepeque	Estadio La Coyotera	
C.D. Brasilia	Suchitoto, Cuscatlán	Estadio Municipal de Suchitoto	
C.D. Chalatenango	Chalatenango, Chalatenango	Estadio José Gregorio Martínez	
Ciclon de Golfo	La Unión, La Union	Estadio Marcelino Imbers	
El Roble	Ilobasco, Cabañas	Estadio Mauricio Vides	
C.D. La Asunción	Anamorós, La Union	Estadio Jose Eliseo Reyes	
C.D. Liberal	Quelepa, San Miguel	Estadio Municipal de Quelapa	
C.D. Luis Angel Firpo	Usulután, Usulután	Estadio Sergio Torres	
C.D. Marte Soyapango	Soyapango, San Salvador	Estadio Jorgito Melendez	
C.D. Municipal Limeno	Santa Rosa de Lima, La Unión, La Union	Estadio Jose Ramon Flores	
Once Lobos	Chalchuapa, Santa Ana	Estadio Cesar Hernández	
Once Municipal	Ahuachapán	Simeón Magaña	
C.D. Platense Municipal Zacatecoluca	Zacatecoluca, La Paz	Estadio Antonio Toledo Valle	
Real Destroyer	La Libertad	Estadio Puerto La Libertad	
C.D. Sonsonate	Sonsonate	Anna Mercedes Campos	
C.D. Topiltzin	Jiquilisco, Usulután	Estadio INDES de Jiquilisco.	
C.D. Vendaval	Apopa, San Salvador	Estadio Joaquín Gutiérrez de Apopa	
C.D. Guadalupano	San Miguel, San Miguel	Estadio Ciuda Guadalupe	

=== Personnel and sponsoring ===
Team	Manager^{1}	Chairman	Team captain	Kit Manufacturer	Sponsor
Atlético Comalapa	(El Salvador) Miguel Ángel Soriano	(El Salvador)	(El Salvador)		
C.D. Aspirante	(El Salvador) Carlos Mario Joya	(El Salvador)	(El Salvador)		
Audaz	(Uruguay) Ruben Alonso	(El Salvador)	(El Salvador)		
C.D. Brasilia	(El Salvador) Milton Meléndez	(El Salvador)	(El Salvador)	None	Frisco, Lemus
C.D. Chalatenango	(El Salvador) Angel Orellana	(El Salvador)	(El Salvador)		
Ciclon de Golfo	(El Salvador) David Ramírez	(El Salvador)	(El Salvador)	Neto Sport	Ahorre En Aguca De R.L., Caja de Credito La Union, Neto Sport, Restaurante Y Bar Punta La Rabida
El Roble	(El Salvador) Ramón Avilés	(El Salvador)	(El Salvador)		
C.D. Guadalupano	(El Salvador) Omar Sevilla	(El Salvador)	(El Salvador)		
C.D. La Asunción	(El Salvador) Edwin Garay	(El Salvador)	(El Salvador)		
C.D. Liberal	(El Salvador) Abel Blanco	(El Salvador)	(El Salvador)	Mitre	
C.D. Luis Angel Firpo	(El Salvador) Nelson Mauricio Ancheta	(El Salvador) Tony Saca	(El Salvador)	Milan (Jaguar Sportic)	DIAL FM, Pepsi
C.D. Marte Soyapango	(El Salvador) Edgar Henriquez	(El Salvador)	(El Salvador)		
C.D. Municipal Limeno	(El Salvador) Fidel Antonio Bonilla	(El Salvador)	(El Salvador)	Milan (Jaguar Sportic)	Ria
Once Lobos	(El Salvador) Antonio García Prieto	(El Salvador)	(El Salvador)	Galaxia	Alba, Galaxia
Once Municipal	(El Salvador) Ivan 'Diablo' Ruiz	(El Salvador)	(El Salvador)		
C.D. Platense Municipal Zacatecoluca	(Brazil) Mauro de Oliveira	(El Salvador)	(El Salvador)	None	
Real Destroyer	(El Salvador) Frank Medrano	(El Salvador) William Murillo	(El Salvador)		
C.D. Sonsonate	(El Salvador) Cesar Acevedo	(El Salvador)	(El Salvador)	Mitre	Proaces
C.D. Topiltzin	(El Salvador) Roberto Hernández	(El Salvador)	(El Salvador)		
C.D. Vendaval	(El Salvador) Carlos Eduardo Orellana	(El Salvador)	(El Salvador)		

== Apertura ==
=== Apertura 2014 Group standings ===
==== Grupo Centro Occidente ====
Pos	Team	Pld	W	D	L	GF	GA	GD	Pts	Qualification
1	Real Destroyer (Q)	18	9	4	5	22	19	+3	31	Qualification for playoffs
2	Chalatenango (Q)	18	9	3	6	29	24	+5	30	Qualification for playoffs
3	Sonsonate (Q)	18	7	7	4	26	15	+11	28	Qualification for playoffs
4	Marte Soyapango (Q)	18	7	7	4	21	16	+5	28	Qualification for playoffs
5	Once Municipal	18	7	5	6	25	27	−2	26	
6	Brasilia	18	5	7	6	20	22	−2	22	
7	El Roble	18	6	4	8	18	24	−6	22	
8	Once Lobos	18	4	8	6	25	28	−3	20	
9	Vendaval	18	5	4	9	18	25	−7	19	
10	Comalapa	18	4	5	9	23	27	−4	17	

(Q) Qualified for the phase indicated

Home \ Away	BRA	CHA	COM	ROB	SOY	OLB	OMU	RED	SON	VEN
Brasilia		2–0	2–2	2–1	0–1	2–2	1–1	3–1	0–0	0–2
Chalatenango	2–0		2–2	0–1	2–2	2–1	1–4	3–1	1–3	1–3
Comalapa	0–0	0–2		2–2	2–0	4–4	1–2	1–0	1–3	2–0
El Roble	0–1	1–3	2–0		2–0	3–2	1–3	0–0	1–0	2–2
Marte Soyapango	1–1	0–0	1–0	0–1		1–0	4–1	1–0	1–1	1–0
Once Lobos	3–1	0–3	1–4	3–0	3–3		2–1	0–0	0–0	1–1
Once Municipal	3–4	2–1	1–0	1–1	2–1	0–0		1–1	0–0	3–0
Real Destroyer	2–1	0–1	2–1	1–0	0–0	2–1	2–0		3–2	4–3
Sonsonate	1–0	0–1	3–1	3–1	1–1	1–1	5–0	0–2		1–0
Vendaval	0–0	2–3	1–0	1–0	0–3	0–1	2–0	0–1	1–1	

Legend: Blue = home team win; Yellow = draw; Red = away team win.

==== Grupo Centro Oriente ====
Pos	Team	Pld	W	D	L	GF	GA	GD	Pts	Qualification
1	L.Á. Firpo (Q)	18	14	3	1	34	10	+24	45	Qualification for playoffs
2	Audaz (Q)	18	9	5	4	31	13	+18	32	Qualification for playoffs
3	Ciclón del Golfo (Q)	18	7	9	2	28	13	+15	30	Qualification for playoffs
4	Guadalupano (Q)	18	6	10	2	21	12	+9	28	Qualification for playoffs
5	Aspirante	18	7	7	4	23	19	+4	28	
6	Topiltzín	18	5	7	6	18	17	+1	22	
7	La Asunción	18	4	5	9	17	30	−13	17	
8	Platense	18	4	3	11	16	30	−14	15	
9	Municipal Limeño	18	3	5	10	9	23	−14	14	
10	Liberal	18	2	4	12	12	42	−30	10	

(Q) Qualified for the phase indicated

Home \ Away	ASP	AUD	CDG	GUA	ASU	LIB	FIR	MLI	PLA	TOP
Aspirante		0–0	1–1	1–1	0–0	2–2	0–2	3–0	2–1	2–1
Audaz	3–3		1–0	0–0	4–1	5–0	0–1	3–0	2–0	0–1
Ciclón del Golfo	2–0	2–2		0–1	1–1	3–0	1–1	1–0	1–1	2–0
Guadalupano	0–0	0–2	0–1		2–1	6–0	1–1	2–1	2–1	1–1
La Asunción	1–2	1–2	0–4	0–0		3–0	0–2	2–0	2–1	1–1
Liberal	0–1	0–4	2–2	2–2	2–1		0–1	1–0	0–2	1–2
Firpo	2–0	1–0	2–2	0–1	4–1	3–1		5–0	2–0	2–1
Municipal Limeño	0–2	0–0	1–1	0–0	1–1	3–0	0–1		2–0	0–0
Platense	2–1	0–2	0–4	2–2	1–2	1–0	2–3	1–0		0–2
Topiltzín	1–3	3–1	0–0	0–0	3–0	1–1	0–1	0–1	1–1	

Legend: Blue = home team win; Yellow = draw; Red = away team win.

=== Second stage ===
Quarterfinals
A4	Marte Soyapango	1	2	3
B1	L.A. Firpo	1	1	2
A2	Chalatenango	1	0	1
B3	Ciclón del Golfo	0	2	2
B2	Audaz	0	0	0
A3	Sonsonate	0	2	2
B4	Guadalupano	1	1	2
A1	Real Destroyer	0	1	1

Semifinals
A4	Marte Soyapango	2	1	3
B3	Ciclón del Golfo	1	1	2
A3	Sonsonate	0	1	1
B4	Guadalupano	1	1	2

Final
A4	Marte Soyapango	0	1	1
B4	Guadalupano	0	3	3

=== Finals ===
==== First leg ====
20 December 2014
20:00 (UTC-6)

Marte Soyapango	0-0	GUADALUPANO
None		None

Estadio Cuscatlán, San Salvador
Referee: Iván Barton

==== Second leg ====
29 December 2014
19:00 (UTC-6)

Guadalupano	3-1	Marte Soyapango
Gerson Serpas 11'; Jonathan Martínez 40'; Ever Martínez 57'		Harold Alas 83'

TBD, TBD Nueva Guadalupe
Referee: TBD

Guadalupano won 3-1 on aggregate.

Apertura 2014 champions

1st title

=== Individual awards ===
Hombre GOL	Best Coach Award	Best Goalkeeper Award
(Colombia) Cristian Carbajal; Atlético Comalapa	(El Salvador) TBDo; TBD	(El Salvador) Daniel Gutiérrez; C.D. Guadalupano

== Clausura ==
=== Personnel and sponsoring ===
Team	Manager^{1}	Chairman	Team captain	Kit Manufacturer	Sponsor
Atlético Comalapa	(Honduras) German Perez	(El Salvador) Sergio Hernandez	(El Salvador)		
C.D. Aspirante	(El Salvador) Carlos Romero	(El Salvador)	(El Salvador)		
Audaz	(Uruguay) Ruben Alonso	(El Salvador)	(El Salvador)	None	A
C.D. Brasilia	(Brazil) Oliveira	(El Salvador)	(El Salvador)	Milan	Ria
C.D. Chalatenango	(El Salvador) Ricardo Serrano	(El Salvador)	(El Salvador)		
Ciclon de Golfo	(El Salvador) Mario Joya	(El Salvador)	(El Salvador)	FILA	Innova S port, Ahorre En Acacu DE RL, Farmancia Francisco, Caja de Credito La Union
El Roble	(El Salvador) Victor Coreas	(El Salvador)	(El Salvador)		
C.D. Guadalupano	(El Salvador) David Omar Sevilla	(El Salvador)	(El Salvador)		INNOVA y Port
C.D. La Asunción	(El Salvador) Mártir Paredes	(El Salvador)	(El Salvador)		
C.D. Liberal	(El Salvador) Salvador Coreas	(El Salvador)	(El Salvador)	None	Alcaldia de Quelapa
C.D. Luis Angel Firpo	(El Salvador) Nelson Mauricio Ancheta	(El Salvador) Tony Saca	(El Salvador)	Milan	Dial FM, Pepsi
C.D. Marte Soyapango	(El Salvador) Edgar Henriquez	(El Salvador)	(El Salvador)		
C.D. Municipal Limeno	(El Salvador) Esteban Melara	(El Salvador)	(El Salvador)	Milan (Jaguar Sportic)	Ria
Once Lobos	(El Salvador) Cesar Acevedo	(El Salvador)	(El Salvador)	None	Alba, Zona Franca 10
Once Municipal	(El Salvador) Marcos Pineda	(El Salvador)	(El Salvador)		
C.D. Platense Municipal Zacatecoluca	(El Salvador) Oscar Parra	(El Salvador)	(El Salvador)	None	Dr Rivera Guida
Real Destroyer	(El Salvador) Jorge Calles	(El Salvador) William Murillo	(El Salvador)		
C.D. Sonsonate	(El Salvador) Ivan 'Diablo' Ruiz	(El Salvador)	(El Salvador)	Milan	PROAIT
C.D. Topiltzin	(El Salvador) Mauricio Amaya	(El Salvador)	(El Salvador)		
C.D. Vendaval	(El Salvador) Angel Chiquillo	(El Salvador)	(El Salvador)		

=== Clausura 2015 Group standings ===
==== Grupo Centro Occidente ====
Pos	Team	Pld	W	D	L	GF	GA	GD	Pts	Qualification
1	Chalatenango (Q)	18	13	1	4	40	21	+19	40	Qualification for playoffs
2	Sonsonate (Q)	18	11	5	2	30	11	+19	38	Qualification for playoffs
3	Real Destroyer (Q)	18	10	4	4	36	27	+9	34	Qualification for playoffs
4	El Roble (Q)	18	8	6	4	33	25	+8	30	Qualification for playoffs
5	Comalapa	18	8	4	6	29	28	+1	28	
6	Marte Soyapango	18	5	5	8	23	25	−2	20	
7	Once Lobos	18	5	4	9	27	30	−3	19	
8	Vendaval	18	4	4	10	13	22	−9	16	
9	Once Municipal	18	4	2	12	18	39	−21	14	
10	Brasilia	18	2	5	11	11	32	−21	11	

(Q) Qualified for the phase indicated

Home \ Away	BRA	CHA	COM	ROB	SOY	OLB	OMU	RED	SON	VEN
Brasilia		0–2	1–1	1–1	2–3	1–0	0–1	1–4	0–2	0–0
Chalatenango	2–0		3–2	3–2	3–2	2–0	3–0	2–0	1–0	6–1
Comalapa	4–0	0–0		3–2	0–1	2–2	3–1	1–3	4–2	1–0
El Roble	2–1	3–2	2–2		1–0	1–1	4–0	2–1	1–2	2–0
Marte Soyapango	1–2	1–2	1–0	3–3		3–2	2–0	2–3	1–1	1–0
Once Lobos	4–0	1–1	2–0	1–2	0–2		2–1	2–3	1–2	1–1
Once Municipal	1–1	2–5	2–0	2–3	2–0	2–3		1–1	0–2	1–0
Real Destroyer	2–1	3–2	2–1	1–1	2–2	3–2	6–2		0–0	1–0
Sonsonate	0–0	3–0	5–1	1–0	0–0	3–1	2–0	3–0		1–0
Vendaval	2–0	0–1	1–2	1–1	1–0	1–2	2–0	2–1	1–1	

Legend: Blue = home team win; Yellow = draw; Red = away team win.

==== Grupo Centro Oriente ====
Pos	Team	Pld	W	D	L	GF	GA	GD	Pts	Qualification
1	L.Á. Firpo (Q)	18	11	6	1	33	7	+26	39	Qualification for playoffs
2	Ciclón del Golfo (Q)	18	9	5	4	22	16	+6	32	Qualification for playoffs
3	Municipal Limeño (Q)	18	7	8	3	16	14	+2	29	Qualification for playoffs
4	Topiltzín (Q)	18	7	5	6	29	26	+3	26	Qualification for playoffs
5	Guadalupano	18	5	9	4	19	14	+5	24	
6	Audaz	18	5	9	4	14	10	+4	24	
7	Aspirante	18	4	11	3	16	14	+2	23	
8	Platense	18	2	8	8	13	26	−13	14	
9	La Asunción	18	3	4	11	12	24	−12	13	
10	Liberal	19	2	5	12	11	35	−24	11	

(Q) Qualified for the phase indicated

Home \ Away	ASP	AUD	CDG	GUA	ASU	LIB	FIR	MLI	PLA	TOP
Aspirante		0–0	1–1	1–1	2–1	1–0	0–0	0–1	0–1	0–0
Audaz	2–2		0–1	1–0	0–1	1–0	0–0	1–0	0–0	2–2
Ciclon de Golfo	0–2	0–0		1–0	1–0	1–0	0–1	0–0	4–0	3–3
Guadalupano	0–0	0–0	2–0		2–0	0–0	1–2	2–2	1–1	3–1
La Asunción	1–1	1–0	2–3	0–1		3–1	0–3	1–1	2–0	0–2
Liberal	1–1	0–4	2–3	1–1	1–1		0–6	1–2	1–0	1–3
Firpo	1–0	1–1	1–2	0–0	2–0	5–0		1–1	0–0	2–0
Municipal Limeño	0–0	1–0	0–0	2–1	2–1	1–0	0–2		0–0	1–0
Platense	1–2	1–1	0–1	2–2	1–0	1–2	1–4	1–1		3–3
Topiltzín	3–3	0–1	2–1	0–2	1–0	3–1	1–2	3–1	2–1	

Legend: Blue = home team win; Yellow = draw; Red = away team win.

=== Second stage ===
Quarterfinals
A4	El Roble	5	0	5
B1	LA Firpo	0	3	3
A2	Sonsonate	0	3	3
B3	Municipal Limeno	0	1	1
B2	Ciclon de Golfo	1	1	2
A3	Real Destroyer	3	0	3
B4	Topiltzin	0	0	0
A1	Chalatenango	1	4	5

Semifinals
A4	El Roble	1	3	4
A2	Sonsonate	1	0	1
A3	Real Destroyer	3	1	4
A1	Chalatenango	1	2	3

Final
A4	El Roble	1	0	0
A3	Real Destroyer	1	0	0

=== Finals ===
==== First leg ====
23 May 2015
20:00 (UTC-6)

El Roble	1-1	Real Destroyer
Walter Fuentes 70'		Carlos Calderon 29'

Estadio Mauricio Vides, Ilobasco
Referee: TBD

==== Second leg ====
31 May 2015
14:00 (UTC-6)

Real Destroyer	4-1	El Roble
Carlos Macasaet 57'; Juan Vasquez 78' & 83' & 85'		Jose Amaya 64'

Estadio Cancha Chilama, La Puerto de La Libertad
Referee: TBD

Real Destroyer won 5-2 on aggregate.

Clausura 2015 champions

1st title

=== Individual awards ===
Hombre GOL	Best Coach Award	Best Goalkeeper Award
(Colombia) Bladimir Díaz; C.D. Chalatenango	(El Salvador) TBDo; TBD	(El Salvador) Élmer Martínez; C.D. Sonsonate

== Aggregate table ==
=== Grupo Centro-Occidente ===
Pos	Team	Pld	W	D	L	GF	GA	GD	Pts	Relegation
1	Chalatenango	34	21	3	10	66	44	+22	66	
2	Sonsonate	34	17	11	6	49	24	+25	62	
3	Real Destroyer	34	18	8	8	57	44	+13	62	
4	El Roble	34	13	9	12	48	47	+1	48	
5	Marte Soyapango	34	11	11	12	40	38	+2	44	
6	Comalapa	34	11	9	14	48	49	−1	42	
7	Once Municipal	34	11	7	16	40	60	−20	40	
8	Once Lobos	34	8	11	15	48	55	−7	35	
9	Vendaval	34	9	7	18	30	45	−15	34	
10	Brasilia	34	7	12	15	28	48	−20	33	Relegation to Tercera División de Fútbol Salvadoreño

=== Grupo Centro-Oriente ===
Pos	Team	Pld	W	D	L	GF	GA	GD	Pts	Relegation
1	L.Á. Firpo	34	23	9	2	63	17	+46	78	
2	Ciclón del Golfo	34	15	15	4	49	25	+24	60	
3	Audaz	34	12	14	8	40	23	+17	50	
4	Guadalupano	34	10	18	6	36	25	+11	48	
5	Topiltzín	34	11	12	11	45	42	+3	45	
6	Aspirante	34	9	18	7	35	32	+3	45	
7	Municipal Limeño	34	10	13	11	25	34	−9	43	
8	La Asunción	34	7	8	19	29	51	−22	29	
9	Platense	34	6	11	17	27	51	−24	29	
10	Liberal	34	4	8	22	23	72	−49	20	Relegation to Tercera División de Fútbol Salvadoreño
