= Walter Soto =

Salvadoran footballer (born 1983)

Personal information
- Full name: Walter Fabricio Soto Pineda
- Date of birth: December 22, 1983 (age 42)
- Place of birth: San Miguel, El Salvador
- Height: 1.77 m (5 ft 10 in)
- Position: Forward

Team information
- Current team: Águila

Youth career
- 2005–2008: Vista Hermosa

Senior career*
Years	Team	Apps	(Gls)
1999–2005	España		
2006	Vista Hermosa		
2006–2007	ADI		
2008	San Salvador F.C.	8	(0)
2008–2009	Liberal		
2009–2010	Municipal Limeño	8	(0)
2010–2011	Vista Hermosa		
2012–	Águila		

International career^{‡}
2011–	El Salvador	1	(0)
- * Club domestic league appearances and goals as of 27 November 2011 ‡ National team caps and goals as of 22 February 2012

Walter Fabricio Soto Pineda (born December 22, 1983) is a Salvadoran footballer who is currently contracted to Águila in the Primera División de Fútbol de El Salvador.

== Club career ==
Nicknamed Chuperto, Soto started his career at Third Division side España before joining premier division club Vista Hermosa in 2006. He then had spells in the Salvadoran second division with ADI and Liberal, either side of a stint at San Salvador F.C. in the 2008 Apertura Season. He returned to the top tier with Municipal Limeño and rejoined Vista Hermosa in 2010.

In January 2012, Soto signed a two-year contract with Águila nut was denied to play in the 2012 Clausura since he requested to leave Vista Hermosa after not being paid but was not registered in time by Águila.

== International career ==
Soto made his debut for El Salvador in a November 2011 FIFA World Cup qualification match against Suriname, coming on as a late substitute for Léster Blanco. As of February 2012, it still is his only international game.
