= William López =

William López may refer to:

- William López (footballer, 1978-2005), Salvadoran football striker
- William López (footballer, born 1993), Taiwanese football defender
- William Lopez (Marvel Cinematic Universe), fictional Marvel Cinematic character
