= C.D. Guadalupano =

- Full name: Club Deportivo Guadalupano
- Nickname: "Furia Roja"
- Founded: 2013
- Dissolved: June 2015

Club Deportivo Guadalupano was a Salvadoran professional football club based in Nueva Guadalupe, El Salvador. They first entered competition in 2013, competing in the 2013–14 Segunda División de Fútbol Salvadoreño. The team competed in the 2014–15 Segunda División de Fútbol Salvadoreño, winning the 2014 Apertura in December 2014, then ceased operation after completing the 2015 Clausura, which ran to May 2015. Their license was sold to A.D. Leones de Occidente before the start of the 2015–16 Segunda División de Fútbol Salvadoreño.

== History ==
Club Deportivo Guadalupano bought the spot of C.D. Vista Hermosa for the 2013–14 season and played in the Salvadoran Second Division.

Guadalupano won their first league title on 28 December 2014, thanks to three-one aggregate victory over Marte Soyapango, the first leg ended in a nil all draw, However Guadalupano were able to score three goals thanks to Gerson Serpa, Jonathan Martínez and Ever Martinez .

== Honours ==
- Segunda Division: 1

2014 Apertura

== List of coaches ==
- (Brazil) Eraldo Correia (June 2013 -August 2013)
- (El Salvador) Oscar Ramirez (September 2013 – November 2013)
- (El Salvador) Carlos Romero (December 2013 -May 2014)
- (El Salvador) Omar Sevilla (June 2014 – June 2015)
