= William López (footballer, born 1978) =

Salvadoran footballer (1978-2005)

Personal information
- Full name: William Alberto López García
- Date of birth: 24 September 1978
- Place of birth: El Salvador
- Date of death: 20 June 2005 (aged 26)
- Place of death: Quezaltepeque, El Salvador
- Height: 1.69 m (5 ft 7 in)
- Position: Striker

Senior career*
Years	Team	Apps	(Gls)
- Inca Súper Flat
2001–2004	Arcense		
2004–2005	Alianza		

International career^{‡}
2004	El Salvador	1	(0)
- * Club domestic league appearances and goals ‡ National team caps and goals as of 4 August 2012

William Alberto López García (24 September 1978 – 20 June 2005) was a Salvadoran footballer.

== Club career ==
López played for Salvadoran premier division sides Arcense and Alianza.

== International career ==
López made his debut for El Salvador in a January 2004 friendly match against Panama in which he started but was substituted after only 8 minutes. It proved to be his sole international match.

== Death ==
On 20 June 2005, López was attacked in Quezaltepeque by gang members and shot in the abdomen. He died in an ambulance while being rushed to a nearby hospital. His family held members of the Mara Salvatrucha gang as being responsible for the attack. López was survived by his wife, Rosario del Carmen Pacheco and sons William and Cristian. He was buried in Quezaltepeque on 23 June 2005.

As of October 2005, a juvenile had been sentenced to 7 years in detention and other suspects of the murder were still awaiting their trial. Later, Jesús Membreño was sentenced to 40 years in prison for the murder of López.
