= Salvador Coreas (footballer, born 1960) =

Salvadoran footballer (born 1960)

Personal information
- Full name: Salvador Arturo Coreas Privado
- Date of birth: November 22, 1960 (age 65)
- Place of birth: Quelepa, El Salvador
- Position: Winger

Youth career
- Quelepita

Senior career*
Years	Team	Apps	(Gls)
1974–1975	Liberal		
1975–1976	Obrajuelo		
1976–1992	Águila		
1993	Los Angeles Salsa	15	(2)
1993–1995	Águila		

International career
1988–1992	El Salvador	28	(5)

Managerial career
- 2002: Mar y Plata
- 2011–: Águila
- * Club domestic league appearances and goals

Salvador Arturo Coreas Privado (born 22 November 1960 in Quelepa) is a retired Salvadoran football player who has also been working as a coach.

He currently is the coach of C.D. Aguila

He is the brother of Víctor Coreas Privado, the late Luis Abraham Coreas Privado, Marcos Coreas and Carlos Coreas.

== Club career ==
Nicknamed Macho Seco, Coreas started playing football in the youth team of Quelepita and moved to local rivals Liberal at 14 years old. A year later he joined Second division side Liberal and he subsequently left them for Obrajuelo. In 1976, he signed for Salvadoran giants Águila, where he would play alongside great players like José Francisco Jovel and stay for 17 years. A pacy winger, he was played at both the left and right side of the field. In 1993, he had a season with American Professional Soccer League side Los Angeles Salsa.

== International career ==
Coreas has represented El Salvador in 6 FIFA World Cup qualification matches,

His final international game was a June 1994 friendly match against Brazil.

=== International goals ===
Scores and results list El Salvador's goal tally first.

#	Date	Venue	Opponent	Score	Result	Competition
1	16 October 1988	Estadio Cuscatlán, San Salvador, El Salvador	Netherlands Antilles	1–0	5–0	1990 FIFA World Cup qualification
2	21 February 1989	Los Angeles Memorial Coliseum, Los Angeles, United States	Costa Rica		2–1	Amistad Cup
