= C.D. Estrella Roja de Candelaria Arriba =

Salvadoran football club

Estrella Roja
- Full name: C.D. Estrella Roja de Candelaria Arriba
- Founded: 1988
- Ground: Estadio TBD; Candelaria Arriba, San Vicente, El Salvador
- Manager: (El Salvador) Adonay Martínez
- League: Tercera Division de Fútbol Salvadoreño
- Grupo Centro Oriente A, 4th
| Home colours | Away colours |

C.D. Estrella Roja is a Salvadoran professional football club based in Candelaria Arriba, San Vicente, El Salvador.

The club currently plays in the Tercera Division de Fútbol Salvadoreño.

== Honours ==
=== Domestic honours ===
==== Leagues ====
- Tercera División de Fútbol Salvadoreño and predecessors
  - Champions (2) : N/A
  - Play-off winner (2):
- La Asociación Departamental de Fútbol Aficionado' and predecessors (4th tier)
  - Champions - San Vicente Department (1) : 2022-23
  - Play-off winner (2):

== List of players ==
- TBD

== List of coaches ==
- (El Salvador) Adonay Martínez
