= Real Destroyer =

Association football club in El Salvador

A.D Tiburones Sonsonate Los Destroyer
- Full name: Asociación Deportiva Destroyer
- Founded: 2012; 14 years ago, as Real Destroyer; August 2020; 5 years ago, Asociación Deportiva Destroyer; August 2023; 2 years ago, Asociación Deportiva Tiburones de Sonsonate Los Destroyer
- Ground: Estadio Chilama, Puerto de la Libertad
- Chairman: (El Salvador) TBD
- Manager: (El Salvador) Cristian Lopez
- League: (El Salvador) Segunda División
Home colours	Away colours

Asociación Deportiva Destroyer is a Salvadoran professional football team based in Puerto de la Libertad, El Salvador, and governed by the Federación Salvadoreña de Fútbol (FESFUT).

== History ==
Real Destroyer bought the spot of Isidro Metapán B for the 2013-2014 season to play in the Segunda División.

On January 2, 2014 the club name was changed to Real Tecleño. A campaign lead to a return to the original name, Real Destroyer.

On May 31, 2015 Real Destroyer reached their inaugural final in a contest with side El Roble for the top Clausura place. The first leg ended in 1–1 all draw. The second leg was a comprehensive victory for Real Destroyer winning Segunda División title 5–2 on aggregate.

After a two-week game aggregate tournament, Real Destroyer defeated Guadalupano (champion of the 2014 Apertura title) 3–2. Real Destroyer were directly promoted to Primera División. Jorge Abrego was leading the team as a coach.

On 13 July 2015, the Chilama stadium had yet approve the official games; Real Destroyer sold their spot in the Primera división to C.D. Sonsonate.

Real Destroyer sold their spot in Segunda División to the reincarnated version of Quequeisque; then disbanded.

On August 20, 2020 AD Destroyer purchased the spot of Brujos de Izalco and competed in the Segunda Division .

June 10th: A couple of days ago the news had been announced that the Destroyer FC team was putting the second division category up for sale due to the fact that some sponsors withdrew from the club and the low influx of the public in the regular tournament took its toll. to the entire port of liberty.

This news was announced through an official statement where they also took the opportunity to thank the different sponsors who remained with them and at the same time made contacts so that investments could approach and bid for the category.

It was announced that this category would be acquired by the Tiburones de Sonsonate, a team that has a past in Salvadoran soccer and would be a different project from that of Sonsonate FC or AD Sonsonate that had previously been in the first and second divisions. During this week more details of the sale and a new projector that will emerge in the Silver league of the country will be given.

== Honours ==
- Segunda Division: 1

2015 Clausura

== Shirt sponsorship ==
=== Shirt manufacturer ===
- Milan (Jaguatic Sportic)

=== Sponsors ===
- Ria
- SBO (Renta de Ofincas)
- Alcadia Municipal Del Puerto De La Libertad

== Current squad ==
As of April 2026. Note: Flags indicate national team as defined under FIFA eligibility rules; some limited exceptions apply. Players may hold more than one non-FIFA nationality.

No.	Pos.	Nation	Player
11		SLV	Brandon Amaya
14		SLV	Enrique Contreras
25		SLV	David Pacheco
19		SLV	Salvador Luna
9		SLV	Sebastian Aguirre
23		SLV	Oswaldo Gonzalez
7		SLV	Alexis Ramos
5		SLV	Mauricio Gomez
8		SLV	Diego Velasquez
17		SLV	Andres Prado
15		SLV	Javier Chica

No.	Pos.	Nation	Player
26		SLV	Cristian Burgos
6		SLV	Ernesto Crespin
1		SLV	Angel Reyes
20		SLV	Mario Narvaes
29		SLV	Ronald Policiano
21		SLV	Luis Pocasangra
24		SLV	Luis Carranza

== Personnel ==
=== Management ===
Position	Staff
Owner	(El Salvador)
President	(El Salvador) William Murillo
Vice President	(El Salvador)
TBD	(El Salvador)
TBD	(El Salvador)
TBD	(El Salvador)
TBD	(El Salvador)

=== Coaching staff ===
Position	Staff
Manager	(El Salvador) Efren Marenco
Assistant Managers	(El Salvador) TBD
Reserve Manager	(El Salvador) Carlos Cardona
Under 17 Manager	(El Salvador) TBD
Goalkeeper Coach	(El Salvador) TBD
Fitness Coach	(El Salvador) TBD
Team Doctor	(El Salvador)

== List of coaches ==
- (El Salvador) Angel Orellana (June 2013 – December 2013)
- (El Salvador) Boris Romero (Jan 2014 – July 2014)
- (El Salvador) Frank Medrano (Aug 2014 – Dec 2014)
- (El Salvador) Jorge Calles (Jan 2015 – Feb 2015)
- (El Salvador) Jorge Abrego (Feb 2015 – June 2015)
- (El Salvador) Jorge Calles (June 2015)
- Hiatus (July 2015 – July 2020)
- (El Salvador) Juan Ramon Paredes (August 2020 – June 2021)
- (El Salvador) Jorge Abrego (June 2021 – November 2021)
- (El Salvador) Juan Ramon Paredes (November 2021 - December 2021)
- (El Salvador) Rodolfo Gochez (December 2021 - 2022 )
- (El Salvador) Miguel Soriano (2022 - March 2023)
- (El Salvador) Cristian Lopez (March 2023 - June 2023)
- Hiatus (July 2023 – December 2025)
- (El Salvador) Efrén Marenco (January 2026 – present)
