= C.D. Arcense =

- Full name: Club Deportivo Arcense Ciudad Arce
- Nickname: Los Toros
- Founded: 1990
- Ground: Wismar Stadion; Ciudad Arce, El Salvador
- Capacity: 5,000
- Chairman: Jaime Alberto Valencia
- Manager: Salvador Hernández
- League: Segunda División de Fútbol Salvadoreño
- Clausura 2012: 9th (Group A)
Home colours	Away colours

Club Deportivo Arcense Ciudad Arce, commonly known as C.D. Arcense are a Salvadoran professional football club based in Ciudad Arce.

== History ==
On 15 April 2002, Arcense won promotion to the Salvadoran Primera División for the first time in the history after defeating Atletico Chaparrastique 3–2, with goals from Willian López and Sixto Vigil.

but were relegated again after the 2003/2004 season. Despite winning two out of their last three games in 2013, Arcense were relegated to the Salvadoran Third Division.

== League and playoffs performance ==
(2003 Apertura-Clausura 2004)

Season	Position	GP	W	D	L	GF	GA	PTS	Play-offs
Apertura 2003	8th	18	2	11	5	23	32	17	Did not qualify
Clausura 2004	9th	18	4	6	8	16	23	18	Did not qualify

== List of coaches ==
- (El Salvador) Cesar Acevedo (1992–1995)
- (Brazil) Jorge Tupinambá dos Santos (1994)
- (El Salvador) Juan Ramón Sánchez (1995–1996)
- (El Salvador) Ricardo "Coneja" Guardado (2002- October 2003)
- (Argentina) Raul Hector Donsanti (October 2003 - )
- (Argentina) Andres Novares (2003)
- (El Salvador) Luis Ángel Navarro (2004)
- (El Salvador) Jorge Salazar (2005)
- (El Salvador) Raúl Corcio Zavaleti (2006)
- (El Salvador) José Noel Erazo (August 2006-)
- (El Salvador) Luis Ángel Navarro
- (El Salvador) Salvador Hernández (2011)
- (El Salvador) Ignacio Cartagena (2012–)
- (El Salvador) Ricardo Mena Laguán
- (Honduras) Tomas Good Lopez
