= CD Liberal =

Association football club in El Salvador

C.D. Liberal
- Full name: Club Deportivo Liberal Quelepa de Jaguar de Piedra
- Founded: 1962
- Ground: Estadio Jaguar de Piedra, Quelepa, El Salvador
- Capacity: 2,000
- Manager: Marvin Bernal Silva
- League: Segunda Division
Home colours	Away colours

C.D. Liberal are a Salvadoran professional football club based in Quelepa, San Miguel, El Salvador.

In 2015, Brasilia were relegated to the Salvadoran Third Division.

== Honours ==
=== Domestic honours ===
- Segunda División Salvadorean and predecessors
- Champions (1) : TBD
- Tercera División Salvadorean and predecessors
  - Champions:(1) : Apertura 2017

== Current squad ==
As of 2018: Note: Flags indicate national team as defined under FIFA eligibility rules; some limited exceptions apply. Players may hold more than one non-FIFA nationality.

No.	Pos.	Nation	Player
—		HON	Gregory Costly
—		SLV	Josue Chirino
—		SLV	David Hernandez
—		SLV	Jorge Zelaya
—		SLV	Ivan Padilla
—		SLV	Carlos Cocar
—		SLV	Ever Yanez
—		SLV	Romel Mejia
—		SLV	Fernando Cortez
—		SLV	Cristian Giron
—		SLV	Rodrigo Quinteros
—		SLV	Ervin Bonilla
—		SLV	William Alegria

== Notable coaches ==
- (El Salvador) Maximo Santana Orellana
- (El Salvador) Juan Antonio Merlos
- (El Salvador) Manuel de la Paz Palacios
- (El Salvador) Marvin Bernal Silva (1984)
- (El Salvador) Esteban Melara (1990)
- (El Salvador) Omar Sevilla (2000)
- (El Salvador) Salomón Quintanilla (−2002)
- (El Salvador) Hermes Rodríguez (2002–)
- (El Salvador) Salvador Coreas Privado (2003–2004)
- (Brazil) Eraldo Correia (2006)
- (El Salvador) Omar Sevilla (2007)
- (El Salvador) Esteban Melara (2008–2009)
- (El Salvador) Miguel Angel Aguilar Obando (2008–09)
- (El Salvador) Marvin Benítez "la Perica" (2010–2011)
- (El Salvador) Nelson Mauricio Ancheta (Aug 2013 – Nov 2013)
- (El Salvador) Víctor Coreas (Nov 2013–2014)
- (El Salvador) Abel Blanco (Aug 2014 – Dec 2014)
- (El Salvador) Salvador Coreas (Jan 2015–)
- (El Salvador) Edwin Garay (Jan 2016–)
- (El Salvador) José Héctor Bernal Silva (2017)
- (El Salvador) Omar Sevilla (May 2018 – Nov 2018)
- (El Salvador) Ervin Loza (Nov 2018 – Dec 2018)
- (El Salvador) Salomón Quintanilla (Dec 2018– Feb 2019)
- (El Salvador) Abel Blanco (Feb 2019–Oct 2019)
- (El Salvador) Nelson Mauricio Ancheta (Oct 2019-Dec 2019)
- (El Salvador) Denis Moreno (Jan 2020-)
