= C.D. Brasilia =

- Full name: Club Deportivo Brasilia Suchitoto
- Nickname: Los Soleños
- Founded: 1960
- Ground: Estadio Municipal de La Ciudad de Suchitoto
- Capacity: 10,000
- Chairman: (El Salvador) Santos Guardado
- Manager: (El Salvador) Jorge Armando Gonzalez
- League: Tercera Division
- Apertura 2015 Grupo "A"
Home colours

Club Deportivo Brasilia, usually known simply as Brasilia are a Salvadoran professional football club based in Suchitoto, El Salvador. They currently play in the Tercera Division.

== History ==
In 1960, a group met in Suchitoto city hall and decided to form a football team named Xotlan. However, after a few months the club changed their name to Club Deportivo Brasilia Suchitoto, named after Brazil who were the football world champions at the time and after Brazil's newly named capital city. Early players included Gregorio Marroquín, Roberto Guardado, Lito Cañas, Nelson Cañas, Orlando Coto, Roberto Santamaría, Mauricio Montalvo and Mauricio Cañas.

Later on Brasilia were able to obtain the services of Jorge "Magico" Gonzalez and the Paz brothers (Rolando and Ricardo) for a few games.

In the 2012 Clausura, Brasilia had their best season in their history reaching the Segunda División Grand Final, however despite Walter Casco scoring in the 77th minute to level the game, the club went on to lose in extra time with a goal late in second half of extra time.

However, after losing their financial support and coach Milton Melendez in 2015, Brasilia were relegated to the Salvadoran Third Division.

On June 16, 2025 Brasilia announced on the team social media platform that due to several sponsors pulling support, high team cost and lack of fans support, the club announced they would be withdrawing from the Apertura 2025 season

== Honours ==
=== Domestic honours ===
- Segunda División Salvadorean and predecessors
- Champions (1) : TBD
- Tercera División Salvadorean and predecessors
  - Champions:(1) : 2023 Apertura
  - Play-off winner (1): 2023-2024
- ADFAS and predecessors
  - Champions - Cuscatlan Department (1) : 2022

== Colours and crest ==
Home kit colours

Throughout the club's early history, Brasilia have worn blue with a blue shorts and socks.

== Stadium ==
=== Estadio Municipal de La Ciudad de Suchitoto ===
The club's home matches are usually played at Estadio Municipal de La Ciudad de Suchitoto, which has a maximum capacity of 1,000 people. It was renovated in 2009.

=== Sponsorship ===
Companies that Brasilia currently has sponsorship deals with for 2025-2026 include:

- Galaxia – Official Kit Suppliers
- Loteria – Official sponsors
- Frisco Forming – Official sponsors
- Sandivera – Official sponsors
- Alternativa – Official sponsors
- J. Ayala Painting – Official sponsors
- Electrolit – Official sponsors

== Current squad ==
As of: September 2024 Note: Flags indicate national team as defined under FIFA eligibility rules; some limited exceptions apply. Players may hold more than one non-FIFA nationality.

| No. | Pos. | Nation | Player |
|---|---|---|---|
| 6 | | SLV | Kevin Duran |
| 12 | | SLV | Antonio Casco |
| 10 | | SLV | Carlos Velasco |
| 15 | | SLV | Alfredo ABrego |
| — | | SLV | Nelson Diaz |
| — | | SLV | |
| — | | SLV | Jonathan Rivera |
| — | GK | SLV | |

| No. | Pos. | Nation | Player |
|---|---|---|---|
| — | | SLV | David Guardado |
| — | GK | SLV | Jaime Mozo |
| — | MF | SLV | Henry Benitez |
| — | MF | SLV | Nelson Arevalo |

=== Players with dual citizenship ===
- (El Salvador) (United States) TBD

=== In ===
Note: Flags indicate national team as defined under FIFA eligibility rules; some limited exceptions apply. Players may hold more than one non-FIFA nationality.

| No. | Pos. | Nation | Player |
|---|---|---|---|
| — | | SLV | Carlos Choto (From Talleres Jr) |
| — | | SLV | Mauricio Dominguez (From Estrella Roja ) |
| — | | SLV | Walter Casco (From Coaching Staff) |
| — | | COL | Freddy Gonzalez (From Free agent) |
| — | | SLV | TBD (From Free agent) |
| — | | SLV | TBD (From Free agent) |

| No. | Pos. | Nation | Player |
|---|---|---|---|
| — | | SLV | TBD (From Free agent) |
| — | | SLV | TBD (From Free agent) |

=== Out ===
Note: Flags indicate national team as defined under FIFA eligibility rules; some limited exceptions apply. Players may hold more than one non-FIFA nationality.

| No. | Pos. | Nation | Player |
|---|---|---|---|
| — | | SLV | Yonatan Pineda (To TBD) |
| — | | SLV | Fidel Gonzalez (To TBD) |
| — | | SLV | Ulises Arevalo (To TBD) |
| — | | SLV | Elton Olmedo (To TBD) |

| No. | Pos. | Nation | Player |
|---|---|---|---|
| — | | SLV | Bladimir Ponce (To TBD) |
| — | | SLV | Ever Coto (To TBD) |
| — | | SLV | TBD (To TBD) |

== Notable players ==
Players that have played for Brasilia in their career and played in a World Cup:

- (El Salvador) Silvio Aquino
- (El Salvador) Caly Cañadas

== Coaching staff ==
As of March 2025

| Position | Staff |
|---|---|
| Manager | (El Salvador) Alexi Guerra |
| Assistant Manager | (El Salvador) TBD |
| Physical coach | (El Salvador) Miguel Rubio |
| Goalkeeper Coach | (El Salvador) TBD |
| Kineslogic | (El Salvador) TBD |
| Utility Equipment | (El Salvador) TBD |
| Football director | (El Salvador) TBD |
| Team Doctor | (El Salvador) TBD |

== List of coaches ==
- (El Salvador) Manuel Antonio Cienfuegos (1976)
- (El Salvador) Orlando Cotto (1976–1977)
- (El Salvador) Geovanni Portillo
- (El Salvador) Víctor Hugo López Santillana (2007-2008)
- (El Salvador) Willian Renderos Iraheta (2009)
- (El Salvador) Milton Meléndez (2010 – Dec 2014)
- (Brazil) Oliveira (Jan 2015 – Feb 2015)
- (El Salvador) Fausto Vásquez (Feb 2015 – July 2015)
- (El Salvador) Raul Danilo Castillo (Aug 2015 – Dec 2015)
- (El Salvador) Oscar Martinez (Jan 2016 – Feb 2016)
- (El Salvador) Erick Cruz (Feb 2016–)
- (El Salvador) Walter Casco (2022- 2024)
- (El Salvador) Jorge Armando Gonzalez (2024-December 2024)
- (El Salvador) Alexi Guerra (January 2025 - June 2025)
- Hiatus (June 2025 - Present)
