= Estadio Mauricio Vides =

Coordinates: 13.8446°N 88.8548°W

Estadio Mauricio Vides is a multi-use stadium in Ilobasco, El Salvador. It is currently used mostly for football matches and is the home stadium of El Roble de Ilobasco. The stadium holds 4,000 spectators.
