= ADI F.C. =

Salvadoran football club

- Full name: Asociación Deportiva Intipucá Fútbol Club
- Founded: 1970
- Ground: Estadio de Intipucá, Intipucá, El Salvador
- Capacity: 5.000
- Chairman: Miguel Luis Zelaya
- Manager: Edwin Garay
- League: Segunda División de El Salvador
- Apertura 2011: Group B, 7th
Home colours	Away colours

Asociación Deportiva Intipucá Fútbol Clube is a Salvadoran professional football club based in Intipucá, El Salvador and founded in 1970.

== History ==
Founded in 1970, ADI F.C.'s name was recommended by Enrique Villatoro, who served as secretary of the local Intipucá magistrate. The founding members were brothers Israel and Rigoberto Marquez, Leonel Salinas, and other leading local personalities. The team began in the third tier, now called the Amateur League, and relied on talented players from nearby villages and districts. They reached League B (now Tercera Division de Fútbol Salvadoreño), and remained there for almost a decade. However, the armed conflict in the country led to the disappearance of the team in 1979.

In 1986, the club resurfaced with new leaders, including the current club president Edwin Hernandez as well as Alfredo Zelaya, Rene Berrios, and others. In 2004, Mr. Jacinto Rivera set the club goal to reach the professional league, but this has not yet been achieved. Rivera acquired the status of Tercera Division Canton Brazil Arm of San Miguel. One year later they reached the Segunda División de El Salvador thanks to the encouragement and financial support of a US directive.

== Managers ==
- (Honduras) Tomas Good
- (El Salvador) José Roberto Villalobos
- (El Salvador) Esteban Melara (2008)
- (El Salvador) Carlos Mario Joya (2009)
- (El Salvador) Salomón Quintanilla (2009—2010)
- (El Salvador) Luis Ramírez Zapata (2010)
- (El Salvador) José Mario Martínez (2011)
- (El Salvador) Edwin Garay Zelaya (2012—2013)
- (El Salvador) Estaban Melara (2014-)
