= Intipucá =

- Municipality
- Nickname: Intipuca City
- Location in El Salvador
- Coordinates: 13°12′N 88°3′W
- Country: El Salvador
- Department: La Unión Department
- Elevation: 331 ft (101 m)
- Alcalde de Intipuca Victoria Salmeron Gutierrez

Intipucá is a small municipality in the southwestern La Unión department of El Salvador.

== Etymology ==
Intipucá is a cognate of the Intibucá department of neighboring Honduras and is an alternate spelling of the same term in the Lenca language. However, due to historical events, the indigenous peoples and their languages are neither recognized nor self identified in El Salvador.
