= Milton Meléndez =

Salvadoran footballer (born 1967)

Personal information
- Full name: Milton Antonio Meléndez Cornejo
- Date of birth: 3 August 1967 (age 59)
- Place of birth: San Salvador, El Salvador
- Position: Midfielder

Senior career*
Years	Team	Apps	(Gls)
1991–2000	Alianza FC		

International career
1988–1996	El Salvador	25	(3)

Managerial career
- 2003–2004: Coca Cola
- 2005–2006: Alianza FC (assistant)
- 2008–2009: CD Chalatenango (assistant)
- 2009: CD Chalatenango
- 2010–2014: CD Brasilia
- 2015–2020: Alianza FC (sport director)
- 2016: Alianza FC
- 2020-2025: Alianza FC (sport director)
- 2020-2022: Alianza FC
- 2023: Alianza FC
- * Club domestic league appearances and goals

Milton Antonio Meléndez Cornejo (born 3 August 1967) is a former Salvadoran professional football player. Wife: Marisol Perez Sons: Tatiana Melendez, Pamela Melendez y Milton Melendez

== Club career ==
Nicknamed El Tigana, Meléndez played the majority of his career at Alianza, club where he played until 2000.

With Alianza, Meléndez won the Apertura 1998 final against Luis Ángel Firpo.

== Coaching career ==
After he retired from playing, he became a manager.

=== Coca-Cola ===
In 2003, Meléndez signed as new coach of Coca-Cola.

=== Alianza ===
In 2005, Meléndez signed as assistant coach of Alianza FC. Oscar del Solar was the head coach.

=== Chalatenango ===
In 2009, Meléndez signed as assistant coach of Chalatenango.

=== Return to Chalatenango ===
In 2009, Mélendez signed as new coach of Chalatenango, replacing Carlos Antonio Meléndez. However, Mélendez left the club that same year.

=== Brasilia ===
In 2010, Mélendez signed as new coach of Brasilia of Segunda División, replacing William Renderos Iraheta.

=== Second return to Alianza ===
In February 2015, Meléndez signed as new director of football of Alianza.

In February 2016, sport director Milton Meléndez and assistant coach Juan Carlos Serrano were confirmed as interim managers of Alianza, replacing Rubén Alonso. Both were later replaced by Daniel Fernández.

=== Third return to Alianza ===
In August 2016, Meléndez signed as coach of Alianza for the rest of the Apertura 2016 tournament, replacing Daniel Fernández. Meléndez led them to the final of that tournament, but they were defeated by Santa Tecla FC at the Estadio Cuscatlán (2–3). In December 2016, Meléndez was replaced by Jorge Rodríguez.

=== Return as interim and official coach ===
During December 2020 Alianza fired his coach Juan Cortés and replaced him. He reached the finals of four consecutives tournaments and won three of those against C.D. Águila (twice) and C.D. Platense.

== International career ==
Meléndez made his debut for El Salvador in 1988 and has earned over 25 caps, scoring at least 3 goals. He has represented his country in 6 FIFA World Cup qualification matches and played at the 1993 UNCAF Nations Cup. He also was a non-playing squad member at the 1996 CONCACAF Gold Cup.

His final international game was an October 1996 friendly match against Honduras.

== Honours ==
=== Player ===
==== Club ====
Alianza F.C.

- Primera División
  - Runners-up: Championship 1991–92
  - Runners-up: Championship 1992–93

Alianza F.C.

- Primera División
  - Champions: Championship 1993–94
  - Champions: Championship 1996–97
  - Champions: Apertura 1998
- UNCAF Interclub Cup
  - Champions: Championship 1997

=== Manager ===
==== Club ====
Alianza F.C.

- Primera División
  - Runners-up: Apertura 2016
  - Runners-up: Clausura 2021

Alianza F.C.

- Primera División
  - Champions: Apertura 2020
  - Champions: Apertura 2021
  - Champions: Clausura 2022
