= C.D. Marte Soyapango =

Association football club in El Salvador

- Full name: Club Deportivo Marte Soyapango
- Founded: 1949; 77 years ago, as Club Deportivo Marte Soyapango
- Ground: Estadio Espana, Soyapango, El Salvador
- Manager: (El Salvador) Mauricio Alfaro
- League: Segunda División Salvadorean
Home colours	Away colours	Third colours

Club Deportivo Marte Soyapango is a Salvadoran professional football club.

== History ==
Marte Soyapango purchased C.D. Chagüite spot in the Segunda División Salvadorean in 2019.

== Honours ==
=== Domestic honours ===
- Segunda División Salvadorean and predecessors
  - Champions (2) : 1987, 1999
- Tercera División Salvadorean and predecessors
  - Champions:(1) :
- Liga ADFAS and predecessors
  - Champions:(1) :2017

== Stadium ==
- Estadio Jorgito Meléndez (2005–2018)
- Estadio España de Soyapango (2019-Present)
- Estadio Cuscatlán; San Salvador (2014) final series home ground

== Notable players ==
- (El Salvador) Jorge "El Conejo" Liévano

== List of coaches ==
- (El Salvador) Piolín Melgar
- (El Salvador) Carlos "Chicharrón" Aguilar (1996-May 1996)
- (El Salvador) Carlos "Chicharrón" Aguilar (1999-2000)
- (El Salvador) Ricardo Herrera (90s)
- (El Salvador) Manuel de Jesús Rivas (2007)
- (El Salvador) Manuel Aguilar (2007)
- (El Salvador) Guillermo Rivera (2008)
- (El Salvador) Ricardo "La Culebra" García (2009)
- (El Salvador) Fausto Omar Vásquez (2010)
- (El Salvador) Geovanni Portillo
- (El Salvador) Luis Ángel León (2011)
- (El Salvador) Edson Flores (2011)
- (El Salvador) Guillermo Rivera (2011–2012)
- (El Salvador) Carlos Antonio Meléndez (2012)
- (Chile) Raúl Toro Basáez (2013)
- (El Salvador) Miguel Angel Soriano (2013 – August 2013)
- (El Salvador) Jorge Calles (September 2013 – June 2014)
- (El Salvador) Edgar Henríquez Kiko (July 2014 – July 2015)
- (El Salvador) Juan Ramón Paredes (July 2015 – February 2016)
- (Uruguay) Rubén Alonso (February 2016 – July 2016)
- (El Salvador) William Osorio (July 2019 - February 2020)
- (El Salvador) Juan Ramón Paredes (March 2020-)
- (El Salvador) Rudy Cecilios ( - November 2020)
- (El Salvador) Edson Flores (November 2020 -July 2021)
- (El Salvador) Mauricio Alfaro (July 2021-Present)
