= Quelepa =

Archaeological site in El Salvador

Coordinates: 13°31′46″N 88°13′18″W

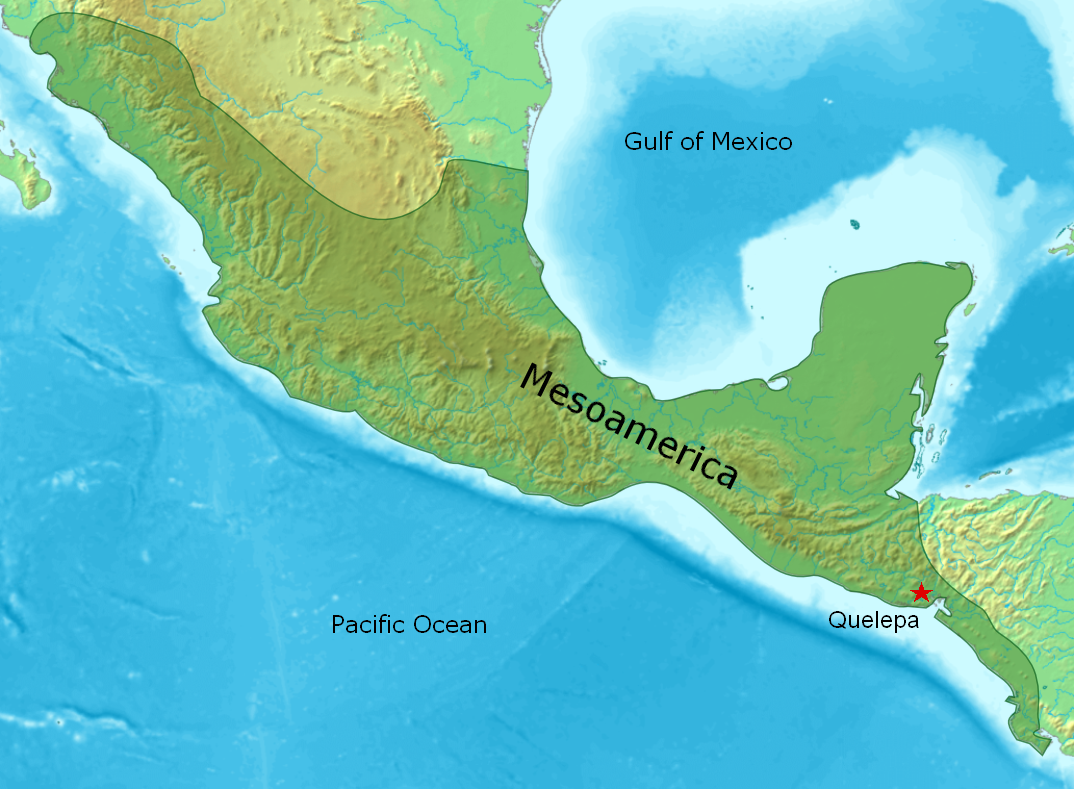
Location of Quelepa within the Mesoamerican cultural region

Location of Quelepa in El Salvador

Quelepa is an important archaeological site located in eastern El Salvador. Generally considered to have been settled by the Lenca people, the site was founded around 400 BC in the Late Preclassic period (500 BC - AD 250). The inhabitants constructed a platform from plaster and pumice and rebuilt it a number of times. Artifacts recovered during the excavations of the site indicate that the local population depended upon subsistence agriculture, these artifacts included metates (a kind of mortar) and comales (a type of griddle). The site belonged to the Mesoamerican cultural region. Quelepa means "stone jaguar" in the Lenca language, probably in reference to the large Jaguar Altar found at the site.

Throughout its occupational history, the inhabitants crafted stone tools from obsidian. The site appears to have been linked to trade routes extending to western El Salvador and the Guatemalan Highlands and also to the north in Honduras.

Although sites in western El Salvador were severely affected by the eruption of the Ilopango Volcano during the Early Classic, its only effect on Quelepa was the severance of trade routes into Mesoamerica. This cutting off did not result in stagnation at the site, but rather resulted in the florescence of a local culture.

== Geography ==
=== Location ===
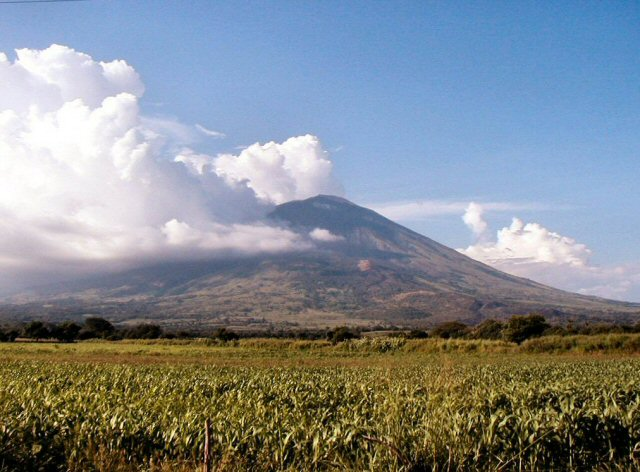
The San Miguel volcano dominates the local topography

The Quelepa archaeological site is located 1 kilometre (0.62 mi) outside the small village of the same name. The ruins are situated along the north bank of the San Esteban River, a tributary of the Río Grande de San Miguel which flows into the Pacific Ocean. The site is located 8 kilometres (5.0 mi) west-northwest of the town of San Miguel. Quelepa is 13 miles (21 km) north of the neighbouring site of Los Llanitos. The archaeological site divided into East and West groups by a small stream called the Quebrada Agua Zarca, which has high, steep banks. The ruins have an altitude of between 160 and 180 metres (520 and 590 ft) above mean sea level.

The archaeological remains of Quelepa are on privately owned land under cultivation, the entire East Group together with a part of the west group are on the land of the Hacienda El Obrajuelo farm. The area to the west of the Quebrada Agua Zarca is planted with maize and cotton, as is the area south of the river.

The general area around Quelapa is part of the flood plain of the Río Grande de San Miguel, lying between the hills to the north and the San Miguel volcano some 30 kilometres (19 mi) from the Pacific Ocean. The volcano is the most prominent local landmark, with its peak at 2,132 metres (6,995 ft) above mean sea level. Although the volcano has erupted 6 times since 1699, most recently in 1924, and continues in a low state of activity it has never dropped sufficient volcanic ash on Quelepa to be detectable archaeologically.

The climate of Quelepa is classified under the Köppen system as tropical wet and dry. The majority of rainfall occurs between the months of September and October with a long dry season from November to May. Monthly rainfall averages between 300 and 400 millimetres (12 and 16 in) in September and less than 25 millimetres (0.98 in) in March. Native fauna has been practically extinguished by the heavy use of pesticides on the local cotton crops. Andrews reported many iguanas near the watercourses and the occasional snake.

== History ==
Quelepa was founded around 400 BC, in the Late Preclassic period (500 BC - AD 250). The first inhabitants of the site constructed a platform from plaster and pumice and rebuilt it a number of times Quelepa is generally considered to have been settled by the Lenca people.

Around AD 539 the Ilopango volcano erupted and devastated western El Salvador, breaking Quelepa's link with Mesoamerica. Between AD 150 and AD 625 Quelepa turned instead to the Intermediate Area beyond the frontiers of Mesoamerica, with artifacts arriving from the north and the east. The major ceremonial architecture of the East Group was built in the Early Classic.

In the Late Classic to Early Postclassic periods (from approximately AD 625–1000), the ceremonial centre of the settlement was abandoned and smaller structures were built around a small plaza. This has been interpreted as a Mesoamerican influence with its origins on the Gulf coast of Mexico, or perhaps from Seibal, a Maya city in the Petén Basin of northern Guatemala. The stone facing from this period is cruder than that of earlier times and stairways replaced the earlier use of access ramps. The ballcourt also dates to this time.

Quelepa as a whole was abandoned around AD 1000, at the beginning of the Early Postclassic period. The abandonment of the site has been linked to the arrival of the Pipil people in the El Salvador region, although there is no evidence that they ever occupied the site.

=== Modern history ===
The first mention of Quelepa in print was a brief description written by Atilio Peccorini and published in 1913. Herbert Spinden mentioned Quelepa in 1915 and Peccorini published another, even less detailed account in 1926. Peccorini reported that the site had many structures faced with stone, a paved "road", artificial terraces and various sculptured monuments, one of which was probably the Jaguar Altar. Also in 1926, Samuel K. Lothrop mentioned that he made a brief visit to the ruins to buy ceramics for the Museum of the American Indian in New York City, he listed Quelepa in his list of archaeological sites in El Salvador under the alternative name of Mayacaquin. The site was visited by Antonio Sol, the Director of the Departamento Nacional de Historia, in 1929.

The first excavation of the site took place in 1949, directed by Pedro Armillas. The investigations focused on Structure 3 in the East Group and were never completed and the results were unpublished, although the fieldnotes he made were forwarded to E. Wyllys Andrews V.

The principal excavations of the site were carried out under the direction of E. Wyllys Andrews from 1967–1969, funded by the Middle American Research Institute of Tulane University and by the United States Department of Health, Education and Welfare.

Although the site is officially listed as a National Archaeological Monument, as recently as 2005 it was effectively unprotected.

== Site description ==
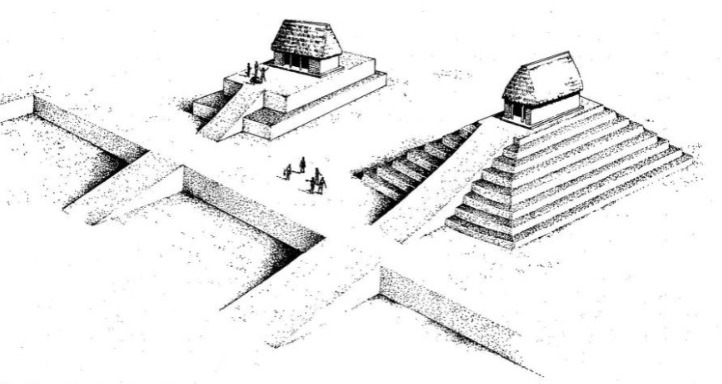
An interpretation of how the site may have appeared in its heyday.

Quelepa has approximately 40 structures occupying an area of approximately 0.5 square kilometres (0.19 sq mi). They are spread out over a distance of 1 kilometre (0.62 mi) along the bank of the San Esteban River, never at a distance greater the 500 metres (1,600 ft) from the river itself. Ceramic remains and isolated mounds extend as far as 3 kilometres (1.9 mi) from the site core. The site is divided into East and West Groups by a small stream. Structure size at the site varies greatly from 10-metre (33 ft) high pyramids to small, badly eroded mounds. These smaller mounds probably served as platform bases for perishable structures. The site also possesses a Mesoamerican ballcourt. Agricultural land use of the site continues to constantly erode the archaeological remains.

The site, unusually for Mesoamerica, features ramps in place of stairways for some structures. Ramps have also been reported from Los Naranjos in Honduras and from Bilbao on the Pacific coast of Guatemala, although the latter differed in form and function from those at Quelepa. In all cases, the ramps have been dated to the Classic period.

The two groups are fairly distinct in their architectural styles, probably due to being built in different periods. The West Group is probably the later of the two groups and is similar to a miniature Maya-style acropolis.

The area south of the San Esteban River lacks structures but contains a great number of tombs.

A cache was uncovered at the site that contained a collection of artifacts associated with the Mesoamerican ballgame, including finely sculpted yokes, palmas and a hacha. They were all placed under a stone slab. These, together with other artifacts such as flutes and wheeled toys indicate a link with the Gulf coast of Mexico.

=== West Group ===
The structures of the West Group are located upon artificial terraces that are generally aligned north–south. To the south of the group the terrain descends steeply to the river. The group consists of a number of mounds, 15 of which are arranged around a rectangular plaza in the southeastern area of the group, most of them upon an artificial terrace. The northeast of this terrace supports a narrow platform upon which was built a long, low structure. A similar structure is on the east side of the plaza. The mounds in the West Group date to the Late Classic.

The I-shaped Ballcourt (denominated Structure 19) is situated 110 metres (360 ft) north of the plaza, it has not been excavated. It consists of a mound measuring 31 metres (102 ft) long and 2.25 metres (7.4 ft) high that forms one side of the playing area, with the west side formed by the face of a terrace. The ballcourt is oriented north–south. The north and sound end zones are close by low, narrow walls running east–west. In the rain season, runoff water flows through the ballcourt and has buried it under more than 2 metres (6.6 ft) of soil. The original height of the sides of the ballcourt was probably around 4.5 metres (15 ft). Two large stone slabs were laid in the centre of the playing area, upon them was a broken sandstone disc that measured 28 by 4.5 centimetres (11.0 by 1.8 in) and was probably a ballcourt marker.

Structure 23 is a small platform dating to the Late Classic. It is located near the edge of a high terrace and closes the west side of a small plaza. It is a single-level platform with vertical sides and measures 8.8 by 6.8 metres (29 by 22 ft) by 2.5 metres (8.2 ft) high. It was accessed by a 1.9-metre (6.2 ft) wide stairway that extends 3 metres (9.8 ft) westwards from the platform. The use of a stairway indicates a major change in architectural style, moving away from the earlier use of ramps and involving the use of poorly reworked stone blocks for the facing of the building. The platform and the stairway both contained a mix of earth, mud and rock infill. Burnt remains of wattle and daub were found scattered around the base, together with fragments of mortar and red-painted stucco. The wattle and daub suggests a perishable superstructure once stood upon the platform but it is not certain if the stucco came from this or from the platform itself. Offering 23 was excavated from the structure and contained three ceramic vessels, including a red effigy vessel. This offering was buried at the time the structure was built and was likely to have been a dedicatory offering. A rough altar had been built in the angle formed by the southern wall of the stairway and the western wall of the platform itself.

Structure 28 is a platform located 6 metres (20 ft) to the south of Structure 23. It measured 1.5 metres (4.9 ft) high and has been badly eroded. Its architectural style is identical to that of Structure 23, suggesting that it also dates from the Late Classic. The platform base was buried under a 25-centimetre (9.8 in) thick layer of burnt wattle and daub mixed with ceramic fragments, probably the remains of a perishable superstructure that once stood on top of the platform.

Structure 29 is a small mound that was a three-tiered pyramid platform measuring 17.2 by 14.1 metres (56 by 46 ft) at the base. It is out of alignment with the other structures in the west group. The mound was 3.5 metres (11 ft) high when excavated but the structure's original height has been calculated as approximately 4.1 metres (13 ft) based on the angle of its stairway. The stone facing was poor quality, consisting of rough, unequal stones placed haphazardly and cemented with mud mortar. This was then roughly covered with a thick, uneven coating of mortar. The lowest tier of the platform was 0.7 metres (2.3 ft) high, the middle tier measured 1.8 metres (5.9 ft) in height and the third tier was approximately 1.6 metres (5.2 ft) high. The stairway climbed the west side of the platform and projected 1 metre (3.3 ft) from the base of the pyramid. Structure 29 was built over an earlier structure that was similar in form. The poor workmanship associated with Structure 29 indicates that it was probably one of the last major structures to be erected at Quelepa. Ceramic evidence indicates that the building was abandoned at the end of the occupational history of the site, around AD 1000 at the beginning of the Early Postclassic period.

Offering 22 was found in front of Structure 29-sub and consisted of 3 ceramic discs piled on top of each other, a large obsidian knife, a piece of haematite, a piece of dusty orange clay, and 43 flakes of obsidian. Offering 24 was found near the southeast corner of Structure 29 and was the most unusual offering found at Quelepa. A stone slab measuring 39 by 69 centimetres (15 by 27 in) was placed on top of three U-shaped stone yokes laid out in an interlaced pattern, together two carved palmas and a sculpted hacha. The larger palma measured 49 by 16.5 centimetres (19.3 by 6.5 in) and was sculpted to represent a seated deity, probably Ehecatl, the god of wind. The smaller palma measured 23.5 by 13.5 centimetres (9.3 by 5.3 in) and represents a feathered serpent. The palmas have been dated stylistically to the Late Classic and show affinities with palmas from Veracruz on the Gulf coast of Mexico. All these items are associated with the Mesoamerican ballgame.

=== East Group ===
The East Group consists of structures clustered close to the edges of enormous artificial terraces. These terraces rise successively to the north as they get further from the river until the highest rests against the base of a range of hills. The massive terraces in the group provided a level base for the construction of further architecture. The terraces were faced with cut stone slabs laid horizontally.

Most of the structures in the group are aligned north–south, although a few are clustered in arranged groups. The two main structures at Quelepa are found in the East Group. They were step pyramids, distinguished from those normally built in Mesoamerica by having access ramps instead of stairways. Structure 3 is the larger of the two main buildings and Structure 4 is the smaller. Both buildings appear to have been abandoned in the mid-7th century AD. The two pyramids faced south towards the edge of their supporting terrace, one of the largest terraces at the site, and were accessed via Ramps 1 and 2 that climbed the terrace edge and were directly aligned with the access ramps of Structures 3 and 4 respectively. Both ramps were paved with massive slabs and rose at an angle of 13°. The terrace and the ramps were faced with large volcanic tuff blocks similar to, but larger than, those used to build the base of Structure 3. The terrace facade measured approximately 4 metres (13 ft) high.

Ramp 1 extended 9.1 metres (30 ft) from the edge of the terrace, at the lower (southern) end it measured 12.1 metres (40 ft) wide, it narrowed as it rose and measured 10.9 metres (36 ft) wide where it met the terrace in front of the access ramp of Structure 3.

Ramp 2 was 17.6 metres (58 ft) long and got wider as it rose. At the lower southern end it measured 8.1 metres (27 ft) wide, widening to 8.9 metres (29 ft) at the top. Ramp 2 is directly aligned with the access ramp of Structure 4. Three offerings were excavated from the base of Ramp 2. Offerings 20 and 21 were close to each other and each consisted of an inverted ceramic vessel placed over another vessel. Offering 18 was 3 metres (9.8 ft) northwest of the base of the ramp and contained two small ceramic bowls, one inverted over the other. All the ceramics from these offering belong to the Shila ceramic complex dated to the Early Classic.

==== Structure 3 ====
Structure 3 is the largest structure at Quelepa. It is situated 11 metres (36 ft) to the east of the smaller pyramid Structure 4, on the third terrace rising northwards from the river. Both the terrace upon which it stands and the structure itself were faced with large, finely cut stone blocks. Structure 3 was built somewhat after Structure 4, which was already in use during its construction. Considerable effort was made to artificially level the volcanic tuff surface of the terrace before construction began. The pyramid probably had eight stepped levels, with the lowest measuring 48 by 32.3 metres (157 by 106 ft) and the highest measuring approximately 22.3 by 9.1 metres (73 by 30 ft). It is not aligned precisely with Structure 3, being oriented 5° east of north, a 10° variance from the earlier structure. The lower levels of the pyramid measured between 1.1 and 1.3 metres (3.6 and 4.3 ft) high, the fourth level was higher, measuring 1.7 metres (5.6 ft). The lower levels had a horizontal depth of between 1.6 and 1.8 metres (5.2 and 5.9 ft), the upper levels of approximately 2.5 metres (8.2 ft). The front (south) face of the pyramid was not straight, the angles of the southern corners were slightly greater than 90° with the facade of the pyramid extending out slightly to meet the access ramp. The excavator concluded that this was to create the illusion that the building was larger than its actual size. The pyramidal base originally stood between 9.7 and 9.8 metres (32 and 32 ft) high. The access ramp was 6.4 metres (21 ft) wide and originally faced in stone, as uncovered during the 1949 excavations by Pedro Armillas. However, after the excavations, the owners of the Hacienda La Obrajuelo stripped the stone facing to be reused as construction material in San Miguel. The surviving remains of the ramp project 8.8 metres (29 ft) from the front of the pyramid, ending 8 metres (26 ft) from the edge of the supporting terrace. The ramp had a total length of approximately 24 to 25 metres (79 to 82 ft) from base to summit and an initial incline of 18.5° that increased to 28° at the upper levels. The south face of Structure 3, including the access ramp, is badly eroded with the damage having been accelerated by the original excavations at the site. Structure 3 was built on top of an earlier structure that had been deliberately destroyed to make way for the new building. Structure 3-sub is estimated to have been 5 metres (16 ft) high. Construction of the final structure is estimated to have begun around AD 500.

The tuff blocks used to dress the lower levels of the structure measure up to 150 by 70 centimetres (59 by 28 in) by 30 centimetres (12 in) and weigh over a ton, during excavations they were unable to be moved by ten men without mechanical aid. The upper levels of the pyramid used smaller blocks that were able to be carried by a single person. The walls of the pyramid were probably coated in plaster and the upper surfaces were paved. Pieces of burnt wattle and daub were found scattered all over the surface, sides and base of Structure 3, the remains of a perishable structure that once stood on top of the pyramid.

At least 3 offerings were buried under the floor of the summit of the pyramid. Offering 2 included a large stone disc placed upon a large cylindrical jade bead. Offering 3 included ceramics with a large grey-green river pebble placed on top. Offering 4 contained only an inverted polychrome bowl. A large offering was buried under the upper part of the ramp and was excavated by Pedro Armillas, the excavated artifacts passed into private ownership and their location are now unknown. The Offering included two large stone discs similar to that uncovered in Offering 2. Upon each disc was placed a four-legged ceramic vessel and underneath each disc were three stone balls measuring between 18 and 20 centimetres (7.1 and 7.9 in) and placed in a triangle. Also underneath each stone disc was a large tubular jade bead. This offering also contained a ceramic vessel inverted upon another with charcoal between the two, and a large vessel inverted over a bowl that contained five jadeite beads and a nephrite hacha, together with traces of a red pigment, probably cinnabar. A further bowl contained a small piece of charcoal.

==== Structure 4 ====
Structure 4 is the smaller of the two pyramids, it is also the earlier of the two buildings. It dates to the Early Classic period. The pyramid base is on the edge of the third terrace rising from the river and is near the centre of the East Group. The structure measures 34.5 by 18.8 metres (113 by 62 ft) and was aligned just under 5° west of north. The pyramid probably only had two levels, the upper level being set back a little rather than centred and measuring 27.2 by 15.3 metres (89 by 50 ft). The lower level measured 2.6 metres (8.5 ft) high and the upper is estimated to have measured 3.2 metres (10 ft) high originally but was somewhat reduced. The total height of the pyramidal platform was about 5.8 metres (19 ft). Access to the top of the pyramid was via a south-facing ramp that measured 11.9 metres (39 ft) long with the lower end extending 6.3 metres (21 ft) south of the pyramid base. The ramp was 5.4 metres (18 ft) wide and rose at an estimated angle of 27°. Excavations revealed that the ramp was built of compacted clay and that the pyramid was packed with unworked stones. Both were built simultaneously. Structure 4 was faced with rough volcanic tuff blocks that varied considerably in size, cemented with mud. The blocks were covered in a coating of mortar that varied between 5 and 7 centimetres (2.0 and 2.8 in) thick and that may originally have been painted although no evidence was found to prove this. Around the base of the pyramid were found large amounts of burnt wattle and daub that can only have originated with the burning of a perishable superstructure on top of the pyramidal platform. The structure contained seven caches, among the offerings were Early Classic ceramic vessels, jade beads and an onyx bowl.

==== Other structures and monuments ====
At the western edge of the East Group is a large rectangular platform supporting architectural remains. The platform was once almost entirely enclosed by walls, leading to its description as a fortress, although the walls are now badly eroded. Structure 9 is located at the southern edge of the platform.

The Jaguar Altar is a huge monolithic monument that measures 314 by 297 centimetres (124 by 117 in) by 85 centimetres (33 in) high and dates to the Late Preclassic, it has a face sculpted on one side in the style of Cara Sucia and that has affinities with the sculptural styles of Kaminaljuyu in Guatemala and Izapa in southern Mexico. The upper face of the altar has a 39-centimetre (15 in) deep square hollow that measures 140 by 160 centimetres (55 by 63 in). All four sides of the altar bear relief sculptures. The altar was removed from the site after Quelepa was excavated by E. Wyllys Andrews and is now in the Museo Nacional de Antropología Dr. David J. Guzmán in San Salvador. It was found 235 metres (771 ft) north-northwest of Structure 29 and 102 metres (335 ft) northeast of the ballcourt. It had been placed near the edge of a 4-to-5-metre (13 to 16 ft) high terrace. When excavated the area around and under it had already been explored by looters. It is not known if the altar was found in its original location or if it had been moved there, one corner of the altar had been broken off and archaeologists were unable to locate the missing fragment, suggesting that it had been broken while being moved.

Altar 2 was found upon Structure 9 in this group. It measures 84 by 70 centimetres (33 by 28 in) by 46 centimetres (18 in) high and was removed to the Museo Nacional de Antropología. The altar is roughly circular with a square hollow carved out of the upper face.

Altar 3 is a fragment that was found in 1970 a few metres east of Structure 36 in the West Group.
