= Jiangjunmiao =

Ruins in China

- Location within China Location within Xinjiang Location within Dzungaria
- 44°42′00″N 89°59′00″E
- Location: Qitai County, Changji Hui Autonomous Prefecture, Xinjiang, China

Jiangjunmiao
- Traditional Chinese: 將軍廟
- Simplified Chinese: 将军庙
- Literal meaning: "General's Temple"
Transcriptions
Standard Mandarin
- Hanyu Pinyin: Jiàngjūnmiào

Jiangjunmiao (Chinese: 将军庙, pinyin: Jiàngjūnmiào) is a ruin and fossil site in Changji Hui Autonomous Prefecture, Xinjiang, China.

== Geography ==
Jiangjunmiao is located in the Junggar Basin near the border with Mongolia, on a mesa and at the top of an alluvial slope. There is a single dirt road which connects the ruins to the nearby city of Qitai, and the Ürümqi–Dzungaria railway connects the site to Zhundong but offers no passenger service. The closest inhabited area is a remote nature park maintained by the county government which hosts the area's petrified forest. The area around the ruins is known as the "Jiangjun Gobi" in reference to the ruin.

The site is located only 33.4 kilometres (20.8 mi) from one of the 45×90 points, four sites on Earth located exactly between a geographical pole (the North Pole) and the Equator, as well as the Prime Meridian and 180th meridian. Jiangjunmiao is the closest named location to the 45x90 point where the 45th parallel north and 90th meridian east converge.

Temperatures in the area can reach 120 °F (49 °C) in the summer months as westward winds blow hot air in from the Gobi Desert.

== History ==
Jiangjunmiao was originally established as a temple memorializing Yang Xigu (楊襲古), a Tang dynasty general who led an army against Turkic nomads in defence of the Silk Road and served as the chief imperial censor (御史大夫, yushidafu) of the Beiting Protectorate around 789. According to legend, the army was successful in securing the area but while returning eastward all of the soldiers died of dehydration passing through the desert; Yangxigu and his men were buried where they were found, and Jiangjunmiao ("General Temple") was established at the burial site.

Jiangjunmiao was abandoned some time during the 19th or 20th century. A number of structures including a wooden inn remained standing when palaeontologist Zhao Xijin visited the ruins in 1981, and by 2004 the only remaining structures in the village were a series of damaged mud walls.

== Geology ==
=== Coal mining ===
Jiangjunmiao lends its name to the Jiangjunmiao mining area, which is part of the East Junggar coalfield. The average thickness of coal seams at and around Jiangjunmiao is 30.62 metres (100.5 ft).

=== Palaeontology ===
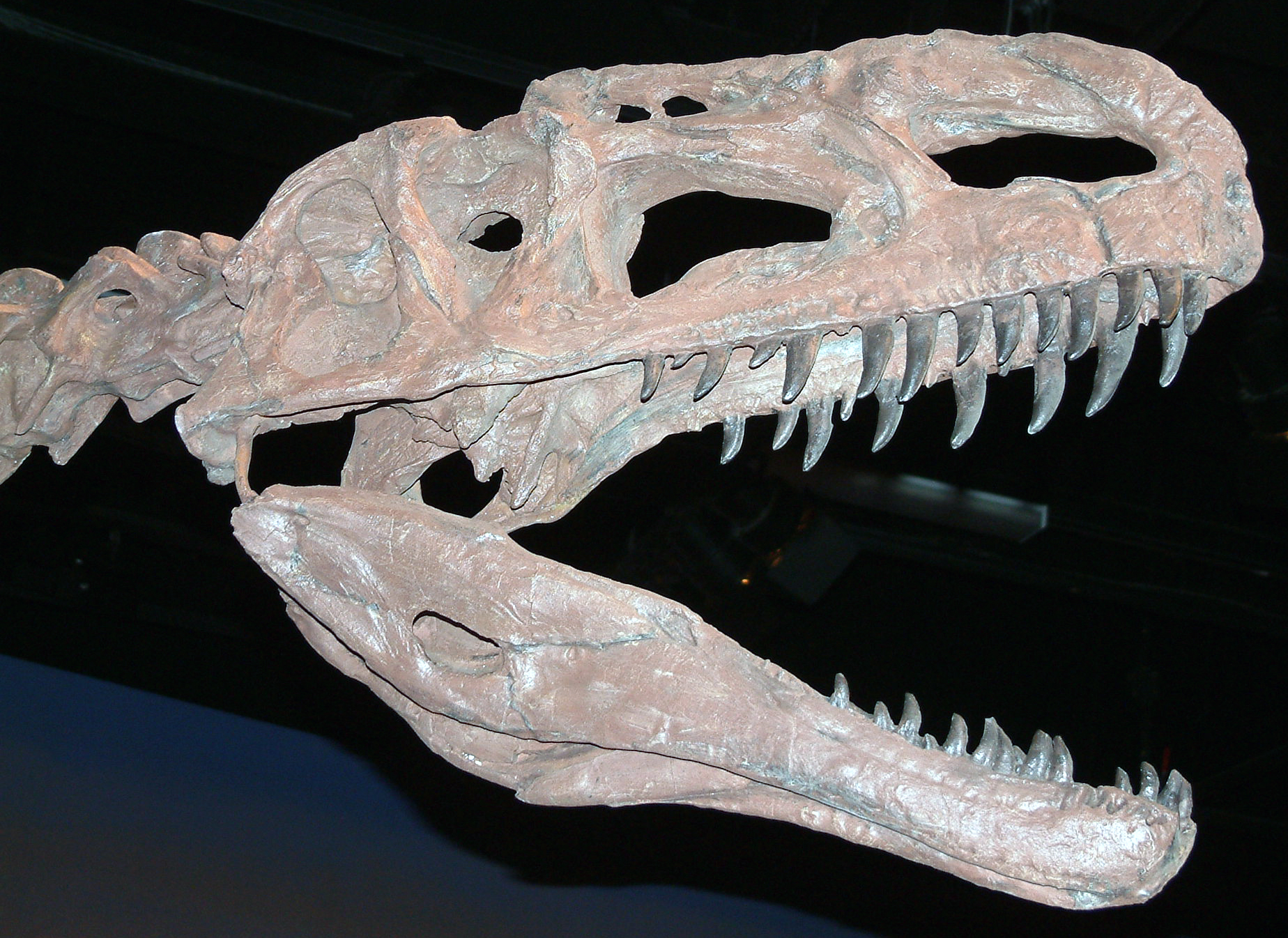
Monolophosaurus jiangi, discovered at and named for Jiangjunmiao

Jiangjunmiao serves as a locality of the Shishugou Formation, a Late Jurassic formation. Beginning in 1981, Jiangjunmiao has served as an important palaeontological dig site and many dinosaur fossils have been discovered in the area, though the earliest finds date back to 1928 when Tienshanosaurus was discovered by Yuan Fu.

The holotype specimens of Monolophosaurus and Sinraptor were discovered in the vicinity by researchers from the China-Canada Dinosaur Project. Fossils of Mamenchisaurus have also been found at the site. Before its name was finalized, Monolophosaurus was known alternatively as "Jiangjunmiaosaurus" and "Monolophosaurus jiangjunmiaoi" in reference to the ruins where it was found. Jiangjunosaurus was named in 2007 in reference to Jiangjunmiao.

Various institutions have participated in digs at Jiangjunmiao including George Washington University, the Guangdong Museum, the Institute of Vertebrate Paleontology and Paleoanthropology, the National Autonomous University of Mexico, Northern Arizona University, and the Royal Tyrrell Museum of Palaeontology.
