= 90th meridian =

90th meridian may refer to:

- 90th meridian east, a line of longitude east of the Greenwich Meridian
- 90th meridian west, a line of longitude west of the Greenwich Meridian

90th meridian west	90th meridian east
