= Galaxy 17 =

Intelsat geostationary communications satellite

- Mission type: Communication
- Operator: Intelsat
- COSPAR ID: 2007-016B
- SATCAT no.: 31307
- Mission duration: 15 years (design life)

Spacecraft properties
- Bus: Spacebus 3000B3
- Manufacturer: Alcatel Alenia Space
- Launch mass: 4,100 kilograms (9,000 lb)
- Power: 9.5 kilowatts

Start of mission
- Launch date: 4 May 2007, 22:29 UTC
- Rocket: Ariane 5ECA
- Launch site: Kourou ELA-3

Orbital parameters
- Reference system: Geocentric
- Regime: Geostationary
- Longitude: 91° West(0°N 91°W)
- Perigee altitude: 35,526 kilometres (22,075 mi)
- Apogee altitude: 35,815 kilometres (22,254 mi)
- Inclination: 0.05 degrees
- Period: 1,430.16 minutes
- Epoch: 13 May 2007

Transponders
- Band: 24 C band 24 K_{u} band
- Coverage area: North America

Galaxy 17 is a communications satellite owned by Intelsat to be located at 91° West longitude, serving the North American market. Galaxy 17 was intended to replace SBS6. It was built by Alcatel Alenia Space (which is now Thales Alenia Space), in its Cannes Mandelieu Space Center, France.

Galaxy 17 was launched by Arianespace from Kourou, French Guiana on an Ariane 5 rocket along with Astra 1L. It became operational at 74° West longitude in the geostationary orbit and replaced SBS-6 which was moved out of the geostationary orbit to a parking orbit in the Graveyard orbit. This took place on July 7, 2007. Galaxy 17 began its move to 91° West longitude when Horizons-2 was launched and placed in the 74° West longitude slot. Horizons-2 was originally slated to replace SBS-6 but the launch was delayed, possibly due to the delayed repairs of the Sea Launch vessel.

Galaxy 17 is the first primarily European satellite to cover the U.S. Built by a French/Italian manufacturer, it was launched on a French rocket from a French spaceport. Galaxy 17 became operational again in mid July, 2008, when it took over traffic of Galaxy 11. As Galaxy 11 has effectively been replaced, any references to Galaxy 11 can now be considered references to Galaxy 17.

== See also ==
- Classic Arts Showcase – a non-profit fine arts channel broadcast from Galaxy 17
