= Joseph Chesak =

American businessman and politician

Joseph Chesak (December 8, 1853 – July 9, 1938) was an American politician and businessman. He was a member of the Wisconsin State Assembly.

Born in Plzeň, Bohemia, Austria-Hungary, to Martin Chesak (1824–1906) and Mary (Sigmond) Chesak, Joseph Chesak and his family emigrated to the United States in 1857 and settled in the Town of Trenton, in Washington County, Wisconsin. Chesak went to Spencerian Business College in Milwaukee, Wisconsin and open a store and hotel in Newburg, Wisconsin. Chesak moved to Marathon County, Wisconsin and started a store. He was postmaster of Poniatowski, Wisconsin and served as town clerk of Trenton and Rietbrock, Wisconsin, school treasurer, and justice of the peace. In 1889, Chesak served in the Wisconsin State Assembly and was a Democrat. He was a trustee of the Marathon County Insane Asylum. In 1902, he switched his affiliation from the Democratic Party to the Republican Party. He moved to Athens, Wisconsin.
