= 89th meridian =

89th meridian may refer to:

- 89th meridian east, a line of longitude east of the Greenwich Meridian
- 89th meridian west, a line of longitude west of the Greenwich Meridian

89th meridian west	89th meridian east
