= Circles of latitude between the 40th parallel north and the 45th parallel north =

Circles of latitude

Following are circles of latitude between the 40th parallel north and the 45th parallel north:

== 41st parallel north ==
41st parallel north (interactive map)

The 41st parallel north is a circle of latitude that is 41 degrees north of the Earth's equatorial plane. It crosses Europe, the Mediterranean Sea, Asia, the Pacific Ocean, North America, and the Atlantic Ocean.

At this latitude the sun is visible for 15 hours, 8 minutes during the summer solstice and 9 hours, 13 minutes during the winter solstice.

=== United States ===
The 41st parallel north defining borders between states in the United States.

In the United States, the parallel defines the southernmost border of Wyoming (bordering Utah and Colorado), and part of the border between Nebraska and Colorado.

In 1606, King James I of England created the Colony of Virginia. In the First Virginia Charter, he gave the London Company the right to "begin their Plantation and Habitation in some fit and convenient place between four and thirty and one and forty degrees of the said latitude all alongst the coast of Virginia and coasts of America." The Jamestown Settlement was established roughly at the midpoint of that territory. The later Pilgrim (Plymouth Colony) settlers were originally bound for the northern portion of the Virginia territory. Instead, they landed north of the 41st parallel on Cape Cod, where they had exclusive rights to the land under the charter for the Plymouth Colony.

As originally set by King Charles II of England in 1664, the point at which the 41st parallel crosses the Hudson River marks the northeastern border between New Jersey and New York. This border then proceeds northwest to the Tri-States Monument at the confluence of the Delaware and Neversink rivers.

The 41st parallel was also one of the principal baselines used for surveying a portion of lands in Ohio. This marked the southern boundary of the Connecticut Western Reserve and the Firelands using the western boundary with Pennsylvania as the principal meridian. It also served as the baseline for a later survey of Ohio land north of the Greenville Treaty line up to the Fulton line which was the original boundary between Michigan and Ohio under the Northwest Ordinance (see the Toledo Strip). The later survey used the boundary with Indiana as the meridian.

The Union Pacific Railroad built along the 41st parallel for much of its length when building the first transcontinental railroad.

=== Around the world ===
Starting at the prime meridian and heading eastwards, the parallel 41° north passes through:

Coordinates	Country, territory or sea	Notes
41°0′N 0°0′E	Spain	
41°0′N 0°56′E	Mediterranean Sea	
41°0′N 8°13′E	Italy	Island of Asinara
41°0′N 8°16′E	Mediterranean Sea	Gulf of Asinara
41°0′N 8°52′E	Italy	Island of Sardinia
41°0′N 9°39′E	Mediterranean Sea	Tyrrhenian Sea - passing just north of the Pontine Islands, Italy
41°0′N 13°57′E	Italy	
41°0′N 17°12′E	Adriatic Sea	
41°0′N 19°28′E	Albania	The border with North Macedonia is in Lake Ohrid
41°0′N 20°42′E	North Macedonia	
41°0′N 21°51′E	Greece	
41°0′N 26°20′E	Turkey	Passing through the Sea of Marmara, and through Istanbul
41°0′N 37°52′E	Black Sea	
41°0′N 38°47′E	Turkey	
41°0′N 39°46′E	Black Sea	
41°0′N 40°20′E	Turkey	
41°0′N 43°32′E	Armenia	
41°0′N 45°10′E	Azerbaijan	Barkhudali exclave
41°0′N 45°13′E	Armenia	Passing 12 km (7 mi) south of Yerevan
41°0′N 45°24′E	Azerbaijan	
41°0′N 49°13′E	Caspian Sea	
41°0′N 52°57′E	Turkmenistan	Passing through Turkmenbashi
41°0′N 61°58′E	Uzbekistan	
41°0′N 68°4′E	Kazakhstan	
41°0′N 68°31′E	Uzbekistan	For about 7 km (4 mi)
41°0′N 68°36′E	Kazakhstan	For about 12 km (7 mi)
41°0′N 68°45′E	Uzbekistan	
41°0′N 70°24′E	Tajikistan	For about 10 km (6 mi)
41°0′N 70°31′E	Uzbekistan	
41°0′N 72°30′E	Kyrgyzstan	
41°0′N 76°50′E	China	Xinjiang
41°0′N 77°30′E	Kyrgyzstan	For about 7 km (4 mi)
41°0′N 77°35′E	China	Xinjiang; Gansu; Inner Mongolia — passing about 20 km (12 mi) north of Hohhot; Hebei — passing about 5 km (3 mi) north of Chengde; Beijing - for about 7 km (4 mi); Hebei; Liaoning; Jilin
41°0′N 126°5′E	North Korea	Jagang Province; Yanggang Province; Passing Through Kaema Plateau; South Hamgyeong Province - Heocheon, Dancheon; North Hamgyeong Province
41°0′N 129°43′E	Sea of Japan	
41°0′N 140°19′E	Japan	Aomori Prefecture - Tsugaru Peninsula
41°0′N 140°45′E	Aomori Bay	
41°0′N 140°54′E	Japan	Natsudomari Peninsula - Aomori Prefecture
41°0′N 141°06′E	Mutsu Bay	
41°0′N 141°19′E	Japan	Shimokita Peninsula - Aomori Prefecture
41°0′N 141°23′E	Pacific Ocean	
41°0′N 124°7′W	United States	California; Nevada - passing just north of Winnemucca; Utah; Wyoming / Utah border Wyoming / Colorado border Nebraska / Colorado border Nebraska; Iowa; Illinois; Indiana; Ohio - southern boundary of Connecticut Western Reserve; Pennsylvania; New Jersey; New York - Passing through of Yonkers, White Plains; Connecticut
41°0′N 73°39′W	Long Island Sound	
41°0′N 72°35′W	United States	New York - Long Island
41°0′N 72°0′W	Atlantic Ocean	
41°0′N 8°39′W	Portugal	Passing about 20 km (12 mi) south of Porto
41°0′N 6°54′W	Spain	Passing just north of Salamanca

== 42nd parallel north ==
42nd parallel north (interactive map)

The 42nd parallel north is a circle of latitude that is 42 degrees north of the Earth's equatorial plane. It crosses Europe, the Mediterranean Sea, Asia, the Pacific Ocean, North America, and the Atlantic Ocean.

At this latitude the sun is visible for 15 hours, 15 minutes during the summer solstice and 9 hours, 6 minutes during the winter solstice.

The earth's rotational speed at this latitude is roughly equal to the speed of sound.

One minute of longitude along the 42nd parallel is approximately 0.7456 nautical miles (0.8580 mi; 1.381 km).

=== United States ===
The 42nd parallel north defining borders between states in the United States

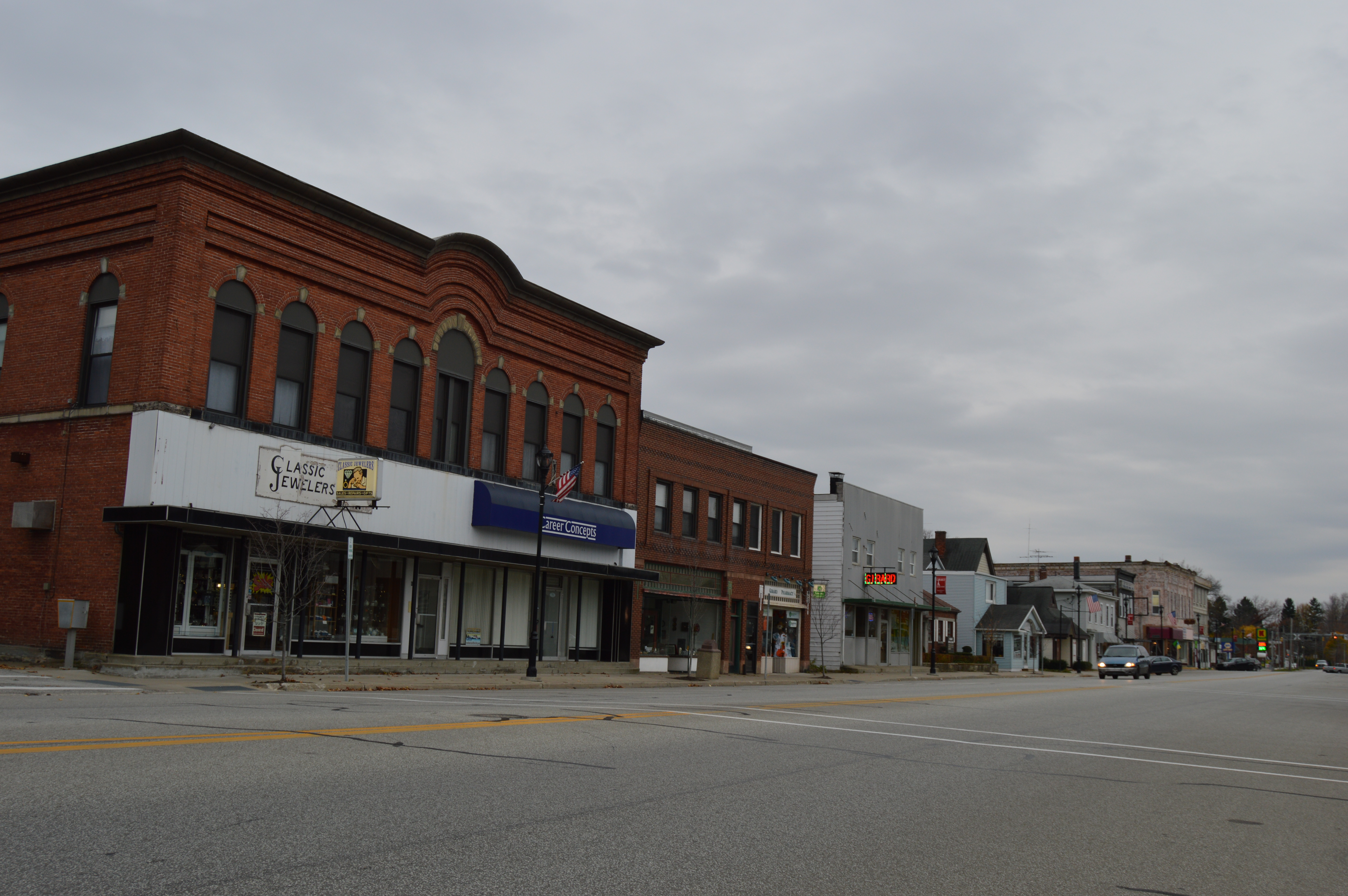
Crossing the parallel in Girard, Pennsylvania

The parallel 42° north forms most of the New York–Pennsylvania border, although due to imperfect surveying in 1785–1786, this boundary wanders around on both sides of the true parallel. The area around the parallel in this region is known as the Twin Tiers.

The 42nd parallel became agreed upon as the northward limit of the Spanish Empire by the Adams–Onís Treaty of 1819 with the United States, which established the parallel as the border between the Viceroyalty of New Spain of the Kingdom of Spain and the western territory of the United States of America from the meridian of the headwaters of the Arkansas River west to the Pacific Ocean. The Treaty of Guadalupe Hidalgo of 1848 then ceded much of what was then northern Mexico to the United States; as a result, the northernmost U.S. states which were created from Mexican territory (California, Nevada, and Utah) have the parallel 42° north as their northern border, and the adjoining U.S. states of Oregon and Idaho have the parallel as their southern border.

=== Around the world ===
Starting at the Prime Meridian and heading eastwards, the parallel 42° north passes through:

Coordinates	Country, territory or sea	Notes
42°0′N 0°0′E	Spain	Passing near Laluenga and Laperdiguera (Huesca province)
42°0′N 3°11′E	Mediterranean Sea	
42°0′N 8°39′E	France	Island of Corsica
42°0′N 9°27′E	Mediterranean Sea	Tyrrhenian Sea
42°0′N 11°58′E	Italy	Passing just north of Rome and through Termoli
42°0′N 15°0′E	Mediterranean Sea	Adriatic Sea
42°0′N 19°9′E	Montenegro	
42°0′N 19°23′E	Albania	
42°0′N 20°37′E	Kosovo or Serbia	Kosovo is a partially recognised state. Some nations consider its territory to be part of Serbia.
42°0′N 20°46′E	North Macedonia	Passing through Skopje
42°0′N 22°52′E	Bulgaria	
42°0′N 26°56′E	Turkey	
42°0′N 27°25′E	Bulgaria	
42°0′N 27°51′E	Turkey	For about 300 m
42°0′N 27°51.42′E	Bulgaria	For about 100 m
42°0′N 27°51.52′E	Turkey	For about 500 m
42°0′N 27°52.08′E	Bulgaria	
42°0′N 28°2′E	Black Sea	
42°0′N 33°17′E	Turkey	
42°0′N 33°34′E	Black Sea	
42°0′N 34°52′E	Turkey	
42°0′N 35°7′E	Black Sea	
42°0′N 41°45′E	Georgia	
42°0′N 46°5′E	Russia	Dagestan - For about 2 km
42°0′N 46°7′E	Georgia	For about 3 km
42°0′N 46°9′E	Russia	Dagestan just south of Derbent
42°0′N 48°20′E	Caspian Sea	
42°0′N 52°27′E	Kazakhstan	
42°0′N 52°48′E	Turkmenistan	
42°0′N 54°51′E	Kazakhstan	
42°0′N 56°0′E	Uzbekistan	
42°0′N 57°10′E	Turkmenistan	
42°0′N 60°0′E	Uzbekistan	
42°0′N 66°0′E	Kazakhstan	
42°0′N 70°20′E	Uzbekistan	
42°0′N 70°50′E	Kyrgyzstan	
42°0′N 79°50′E	China	Xinjiang; Gansu; Inner Mongolia
42°0′N 103°3′E	Mongolia	
42°0′N 105°56′E	China	Inner Mongolia; Hebei; Inner Mongolia; Hebei; Inner Mongolia; Hebei; Inner Mongolia; Liaoning; Inner Mongolia; Liaoning; Jilin
42°0′N 128°3′E	North Korea	Passing through Heaven Lake on Baekdu Mountain
42°0′N 128°29′E	China	Jilin (for about 8 km)
42°0′N 128°34′E	North Korea	North Hamgyeong Province - Kaema Plateau: Passing just north of Cheongjin; Passing just south of Raseon
42°0′N 130°2′E	Sea of Japan	Passing just south of Okushiri Island, Japan
42°0′N 140°7′E	Japan	Island of Hokkaidō
42°0′N 140°53′E	Pacific Ocean	
42°0′N 143°9′E	Japan	Island of Hokkaidō
42°0′N 143°15′E	Pacific Ocean	
42°0′N 124°13′W	United States	Oregon / California border Oregon / Nevada border Idaho / Nevada border Idaho / Utah border Wyoming; Nebraska; Iowa - passing through Cedar Rapids; Illinois - passing through the campus of Loyola University in Chicago
42°0′N 87°39′W	Lake Michigan	
42°0′N 86°33′W	United States	Michigan - passing through Tecumseh
42°0′N 83°11′W	Lake Erie	
42°0′N 82°58′W	Canada	Ontario - passing through Point Pelee National Park
42°0′N 82°29′W	Lake Erie	
42°0′N 80°26′W	United States	Pennsylvania (Erie County); New York / Pennsylvania border New York; Connecticut - running just south of the border with Massachusetts; Rhode Island - running just south of the border with Massachusetts; Massachusetts
42°0′N 70°42′W	Cape Cod Bay	
42°0′N 70°5′W	United States	Massachusetts (Truro, Cape Cod)
42°0′N 70°2′W	Atlantic Ocean	
42°0′N 8°53′W	Spain	Oia (province of Pontevedra, Galicia)
42°0′N 8°39′W	Portugal	Valença (Viana do Castelo District)
42°0′N 8°7′W	Spain	Entrimo (province of Ourense, Galicia)
42°0′N 26°11′E	Greece	Ormenio

== 43rd parallel north ==
43rd parallel north (interactive map)

The 43rd parallel north is a circle of latitude that is 43 degrees north of the Earth's equatorial plane. It crosses Europe, the Mediterranean Sea, Asia, the Pacific Ocean, North America, and the Atlantic Ocean.

The South Dakota-Nebraska border

On 21 June the sun averages, with negligible variance, its local maximum, 70.83 degrees in the sky.

At this latitude the sun is visible for 15 hours, 22 minutes during the summer solstice and 9 hours, 0 minutes during the winter solstice.

=== Around the world ===
Starting at the Prime Meridian and heading eastwards, the parallel 43° north passes through:

Coordinates	Country, territory or sea	Notes
43°0′N 0°0′E	France	Lescure, Ariège
43°0′N 3°2′E	Mediterranean Sea	Gulf of Lion
43°0′N 6°10′E	France	Îles d'Hyères
43°0′N 6°14′E	Mediterranean Sea	
43°0′N 9°20′E	France	Island of Corsica
43°0′N 9°27′E	Mediterranean Sea	Passing just south of the island of Capraia, Italy
43°0′N 10°30′E	Italy	Gallina; Grottammare
43°0′N 13°52′E	Adriatic Sea	Passing just south of the island of Vis, Croatia; Passing just north of the island of Korčula, Croatia
43°0′N 17°2′E	Croatia	
43°0′N 17°40′E	Bosnia and Herzegovina	
43°0′N 18°28′E	Montenegro	
43°0′N 20°6′E	Serbia	
43°0′N 20°34′E	Kosovo or Serbia	Kosovo is a partially recognised state. Some nations consider its territory to be part of Serbia.
43°0′N 21°14′E	Serbia	passing through Leskovac
43°0′N 22°49′E	Bulgaria	
43°0′N 27°54′E	Black Sea	
43°0′N 40°56′E	Abkhazia or Georgia	Abkhazia is a partially recognised state. Passing through Sukhum.
43°0′N 41°54′E	Georgia	
43°0′N 43°5′E	Russia	Passing through Vladikavkaz and Makhachkala
43°0′N 47°28′E	Caspian Sea	
43°0′N 51°46′E	Kazakhstan	
43°0′N 56°0′E	Uzbekistan	
43°0′N 65°46′E	Kazakhstan	passing just north of Taraz
43°0′N 73°33′E	Kyrgyzstan	passing just north of Bishkek
43°0′N 74°43′E	Kazakhstan	
43°0′N 80°23′E	China	Xinjiang
43°0′N 96°10′E	Mongolia	
43°0′N 110°40′E	China	Inner Mongolia; Liaoning; Jilin (for about 26 km); Liaoning (for about 14 km); Jilin
43°0′N 129°53′E	North Korea	For about 5 km (county of Onsong)
43°0′N 129°57′E	China	Jilin
43°0′N 131°6′E	Russia	Primorsky Krai — passing just south of Vladivostok
43°0′N 131°34′E	Sea of Japan	Amur Bay
43°0′N 131°47′E	Russia	Russky Island
43°0′N 131°56′E	Sea of Japan	Ussuri Bay
43°0′N 132°19′E	Russia	
43°0′N 134°7′E	Sea of Japan	
43°0′N 140°31′E	Japan	Island of Hokkaidō — passing just south of Sapporo
43°0′N 145°1′E	Pacific Ocean	
43°0′N 124°28′W	United States	Oregon - passing just north of Crater Lake; Idaho; Wyoming; South Dakota / Nebraska border South Dakota; Iowa; Wisconsin — passing south of Madison and through Milwaukee The parallel 43° north forms most of the boundary between the State of Nebraska and the State of South Dakota. The parallel formed the northern border of the historic and extralegal Territory of Jefferson.
43°0′N 87°53′W	Lake Michigan	
43°0′N 86°13′W	United States	Michigan - Passing through Grand Rapids and Flint
43°0′N 82°25′W	Canada	Ontario — passing through the cities of Sarnia, London, and Welland
43°0′N 79°1′W	United States	New York - Passing through the University at Buffalo and Syracuse; Vermont; New Hampshire - passing through Manchester
43°0′N 70°45′W	Atlantic Ocean	
43°0′N 9°15′W	Spain	Cee (province of A Coruña), Galiza passing through Lugo (also in Galiza); Reinosa (Cantabria) and Arija dam on the Ebro river Orduña-Urduña, Biscay; Irati Forest
43°0′N 1°4′W	France	

== 44th parallel north ==
44th parallel north (interactive map)

The 44th parallel north is a circle of latitude that is 44 degrees north of the Earth's equatorial plane. It crosses Europe, the Mediterranean Sea, Asia, the Pacific Ocean, North America, and the Atlantic Ocean.

At this latitude, astronomically, the sun is visible circa 15 hours 29 minutes before the dawn during the summer solstice and 8 hours, 53 minutes during the winter solstice.

=== Around the world ===
Starting at the Prime Meridian and heading eastwards, the parallel 44° north passes through:

Coordinates	Country, territory or sea	Notes
44°0′N 0°0′E	France	Passing through Montauban
44°0′N 7°39′E	Italy	
44°0′N 8°10′E	Mediterranean Sea	Gulf of Genoa
44°0′N 10°6′E	Italy	Passing just north of San Marino
44°0′N 12°40′E	Adriatic Sea	
44°0′N 15°2′E	Croatia	Islands of Dugi Otok, Pašman, and the mainland
44°0′N 16°32′E	Bosnia and Herzegovina	
44°0′N 19°14′E	Serbia	For about 3 km
44°0′N 19°16′E	Bosnia and Herzegovina	
44°0′N 19°34′E	Serbia	Passing through Kragujevac
44°0′N 22°25′E	Bulgaria	Passing through Vidin
44°0′N 22°55′E	Romania	Passing just north of Alexandria
44°0′N 26°13′E	Bulgaria	
44°0′N 27°41′E	Romania	For about 15 km
44°0′N 27°53′E	Bulgaria	For about 4 km
44°0′N 27°56′E	Romania	
44°0′N 28°40′E	Black Sea	
44°0′N 39°11′E	Russia	Passing just south of Pyatigorsk
44°0′N 47°23′E	Caspian Sea	Passing just north of Chechen Island, Russia
44°0′N 50°55′E	Kazakhstan	
44°0′N 56°0′E	Uzbekistan	
44°0′N 61°26′E	Kazakhstan	
44°0′N 80°27′E	China	Xinjiang — passing about 22 km north of Ürümqi
44°0′N 95°30′E	Mongolia	
44°0′N 111°50′E	China	Inner Mongolia; Jilin — passing just north of Changchun; Heilongjiang; Jilin - for about 2 km Heilongjiang - for <1 km Jilin - for about 10 km Heilongjiang; Jilin - for about 5 km Heilongjiang
44°0′N 131°15′E	Russia	
44°0′N 135°32′E	Sea of Japan	
44°0′N 141°39′E	Japan	Island of Hokkaidō: — Hokkaidō Prefecture
44°0′N 144°17′E	Sea of Okhotsk	
44°0′N 144°54′E	Japan	Island of Hokkaidō: — Hokkaidō Prefecture - Shiretoko Peninsula
44°0′N 145°10′E	Nemuro Strait	
44°0′N 145°39′E	Kuril Islands	Kunashir Island, administered by Russia but claimed by Japan
44°0′N 145°48′E	Pacific Ocean	Passing just north of the island of Shikotan, administered by Russia, claimed by Japan
44°0′N 124°8′W	United States	44th parallel in Wisconsin, United States Oregon - passing through southern Eugene and southern Bend; Idaho; Wyoming; South Dakota - passing just south of Rapid City; Minnesota - passing through Rochester; Wisconsin - passing through Oshkosh
44°0′N 87°41′W	Lake Michigan	
44°0′N 86°28′W	United States	Michigan
44°0′N 83°40′W	Lake Huron	Saginaw Bay – territorial waters of the United States
44°0′N 83°00′W	United States	Michigan – Northern Tip of The Thumb
44°0′N 82°45′W	Lake Huron	
44°0′N 81°44′W	Canada	Ontario – passing through Aurora, rural Oshawa, and Picton in Prince Edward County
44°0′N 77°0′W	Lake Ontario	
44°0′N 76°16′W	United States	New York - passing just north of Watertown; Vermont - passing through Middlebury; New Hampshire; Maine - passing just south of Auburn
44°0′N 69°8′W	Atlantic Ocean	Gulf of Maine - passing just south of Vinalhaven Island and Isle au Haut, Maine, United States
44°0′N 66°9′W	Canada	Nova Scotia
44°0′N 64°40′W	Atlantic Ocean	
44°0′N 59°46′W	Canada	Nova Scotia - Sable Island
44°0′N 59°45′W	Atlantic Ocean	
44°0′N 1°21′W	France	

== 45th parallel north ==
45th parallel north (interactive map)

The 45th parallel north is a circle of latitude that is 45 degrees north of Earth's equator. It crosses Europe, Asia, the Pacific Ocean, North America, and the Atlantic Ocean. The 45th parallel north is often called the halfway point between the equator and the North Pole, but the true halfway point is 16.0 km (9.9 mi) north of it (approximately between 45°08'36" and 45°08'37") because Earth is an oblate spheroid; that is, it bulges at the equator and is flattened at the poles.

At this latitude, the sun is visible for 15 hours 37 minutes during the summer solstice, and 8 hours 46 minutes during the winter solstice. The midday Sun stands 21.6° above the southern horizon at the December solstice, 68.4° at the June solstice, and exactly 45.0° at either equinox.

=== Around the world ===
Starting at the Prime Meridian and heading eastwards, the parallel 45° north passes through:

Coordinates	Country, territory or sea	Notes
45°0′N 0°0′E	France	Aquitaine; Midi-Pyrénées; Limousin; Auvergne; Rhône-Alpes – passing just south of Grenoble
45°0′N 6°44′E	Italy	Piedmont – passing just south of Turin; Lombardy - passing by Voghera and Mantua; Emilia-Romagna – passing just south of Piacenza; Lombardy; Veneto – passing just south of Rovigo
45°0′N 12°27′E	Adriatic Sea	Gulf of Venice
45°0′N 13°44′E	Croatia	Istrian Peninsula, islands of Cres and Krk, and the mainland again
45°0′N 15°46′E	Bosnia and Herzegovina	
45°0′N 18°44′E	Croatia	
45°0′N 19°6′E	Serbia	Passing through the centre of Ruma and through northern part of Sremska Mitrovica; Passing through the northern edge of Stara Pazova, 30 kilometres NW of Belgrade
45°0′N 21°24′E	Romania	Passing just north of Ploiești and just south of Târgu Jiu and Râmnicu Vâlcea
45°0′N 29°39′E	Black Sea	
45°0′N 33°36′E	Crimea	Controlled by Russia, claimed by Ukraine – passing just north of Simferopol, and just south of Feodosiya
45°0′N 35°24′E	Black Sea	
45°0′N 37°13′E	Russia	Passing just south of Krasnodar, and just south of Stavropol
45°0′N 47°15′E	Caspian Sea	
45°0′N 51°4′E	Kazakhstan	Mangystau Province
45°0′N 56°0′E	Uzbekistan	Karakalpakstan (autonomous republic) – including Vozrozhdeniya Island in the Aral Sea
45°0′N 59°50′E	Kazakhstan	Kyzylorda Province; South Kazakhstan Province; Zhambyl Province; Almaty Province
45°0′N 80°2′E	China	Xinjiang – passing through a 45×90 point (halfway between the North Pole and the Equator, and halfway between the Prime Meridian and the 180th meridian)
45°0′N 93°13′E	Mongolia	Govi-Altai Province; Bayankhongor Province; Övörkhangai Province; Dundgovi Province; Dornogovi Province
45°0′N 111°46′E	China	Inner Mongolia
45°0′N 112°31′E	Mongolia	Sükhbaatar Province
45°0′N 114°7′E	China	Inner Mongolia; Jilin; Heilongjiang
45°0′N 131°30′E	Russia	Primorsky Krai - passing through Lake Khanka
45°0′N 136°37′E	Sea of Japan	Passing just south of Rishiri Island, Japan
45°0′N 141°41′E	Japan	Hokkaidō - Horonobe, Hokkaido, Japan
45°0′N 142°32′E	Sea of Okhotsk	
45°0′N 147°31′E	Kuril Islands	Island of Iturup, administered by Russia, claimed by Japan
45°0′N 147°59′E	Pacific Ocean	
45°0′N 124°1′W	United States	Oregon – passing north of Lincoln City and Salem, and south of North Powder; Idaho – passing north of New Meadows, through Brundage Mountain ski area, and south of Salmon; Montana – passing through Clark Canyon Dam (south of Dillon); Montana / Wyoming border South Dakota – passing through Eagle Butte and Watertown; Minnesota – passing through northern Minneapolis and northern suburbs of St Paul; Wisconsin – passing north of Chippewa Falls and near Wausau (at a 45×90 point, halfway between the North Pole and Equator, halfway between the Prime Meridian and 180th meridian, at Rietbrock).
45°0′N 87°37′W	Lake Michigan	Green Bay – territorial waters of the United States
45°0′N 87°21′W	United States	Wisconsin – passing across northern Door Peninsula, south of Baileys Harbor
45°0′N 87°9′W	Lake Michigan	Territorial waters of the United States
45°0′N 86°9′W	United States	Michigan – South Manitou Island
45°0′N 86°5′W	Lake Michigan	Territorial waters of the United States
45°0′N 85°46′W	United States	Michigan – Leelanau Peninsula (Leelanau County)
45°0′N 86°5′W	Lake Michigan	Grand Traverse Bay – territorial waters of the United States
45°0′N 85°47′W	United States	Michigan – passing through southern Gaylord and south of Alpena
45°0′N 83°26′W	Lake Huron	Territorial waters of the United States and Canada
45°0′N 81°27′W	Canada	Ontario – Bruce Peninsula
45°0′N 81°11′W	Lake Huron	Georgian Bay – territorial waters of Canada
45°0′N 79°59′W	Canada	Ontario – passing south of Bala, through Browning Island in Lake Muskoka, south of Bracebridge and south of Kemptville
45°0′N 74°54′W	United States	New York state – for about six miles (10 km)
45°0′N 74°46′W	Canada	Ontario – Cornwall Island; Quebec – running just north of the border with New York, United States
45°0′N 73°54′W	United States	New York – running just south of the border with Quebec, Canada; Vermont – running just south of the border with Quebec, Canada; New Hampshire – passing through Stewartstown; Maine – passing just south of Dexter
45°0′N 67°4′W	Passamaquoddy Bay	
45°0′N 67°0′W	Canada	Deer Island, New Brunswick
45°0′N 66°57′W	Bay of Fundy	Territorial waters of Canada
45°0′N 65°10′W	Canada	Nova Scotia – passing just north of Fort Edward
45°0′N 61°57′W	Atlantic Ocean	
45°0′N 1°12′W	France	Aquitaine – passing just north of Bordeaux

== See also ==
- Circles of latitude between the 35th parallel north and the 40th parallel north
- Circles of latitude between the 45th parallel north and the 50th parallel north
- The Twin Tiers region of New York and Pennsylvania
- The "Jefferson" region of Oregon and California
