= 45×90 points =

Four geographical points on Earth

The 45×90 points on a world map

The 45×90 points are the four points on Earth which are both halfway between one of the geographical poles and the equator, and halfway between the Prime Meridian and the 180th meridian. Both northern 45×90 points are located on land, while both southern 45×90 points are in remote open ocean locations.

== 45°N, 90°W ==
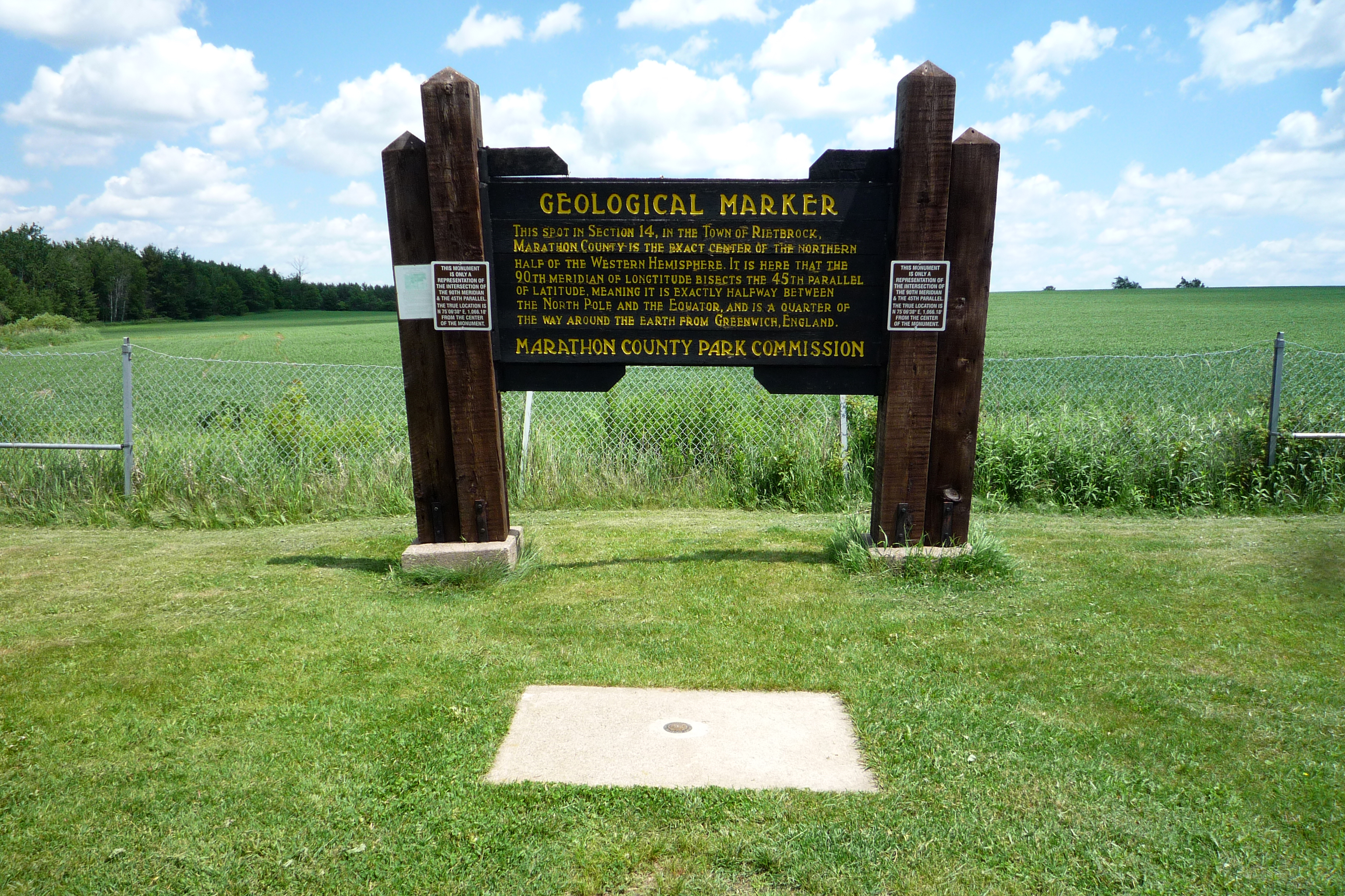
The original marker for the 45×90 point in Wisconsin; the sign was later amended to explain that a marker had been placed on the real location, approximately 324 m (1,063 ft) away.

The best-known and most frequently visited such point is 45°0′0″N 90°0′0″W, which is 410 m (1,345 ft) above sea level in the town of Rietbrock, Wisconsin near the unincorporated community of Poniatowski. A grand board and precise metal ground marker was placed by the Marathon County Park Commission, only to be relocated slightly and restored to visitor access since September 12, 2017.

The former marker has been replaced by a small parking lot with a trail that leads to a long, rectangular park. The Geographical Marker is at the southern end of the park along with informational displays.

The point has become something of a pop culture phenomenon thanks to Gesicki's Tavern in the tiny cluster of establishments in Poniatowski. They sold 45×90 T-shirts and registered visitors as members of the "45×90 Club". Since 2006, the Wausau/Central Wisconsin Convention & Visitors Bureau has been the holder of the official "45×90 Club" registration book. The book is on loan from the family. On becoming a member of the club, the Bureau gives a commemorative coin.

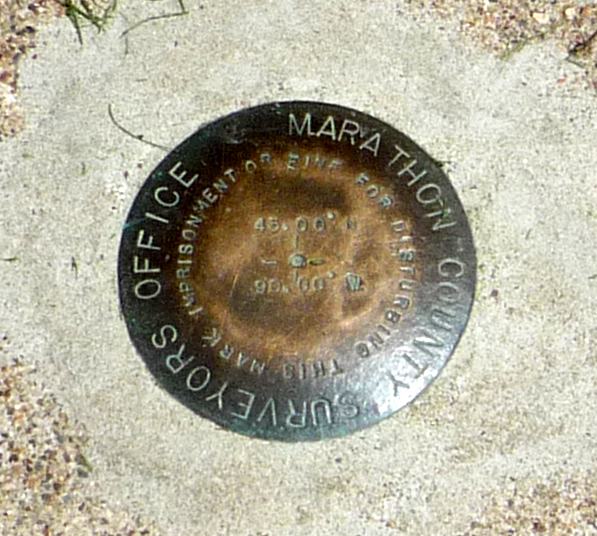
Close up of the incorrectly placed marker in Marathon County, Wisconsin, United States

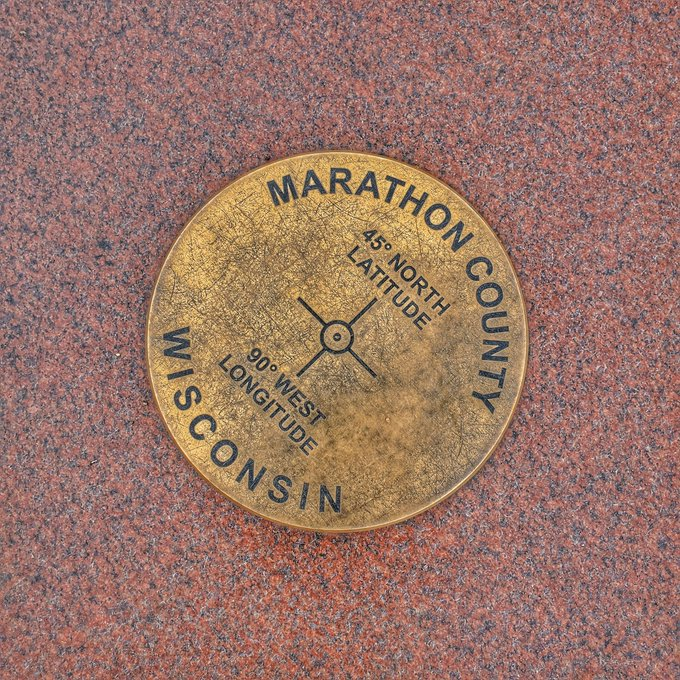
Image of the current 45°N × 90°W marker in Marathon County, Wisconsin, United States

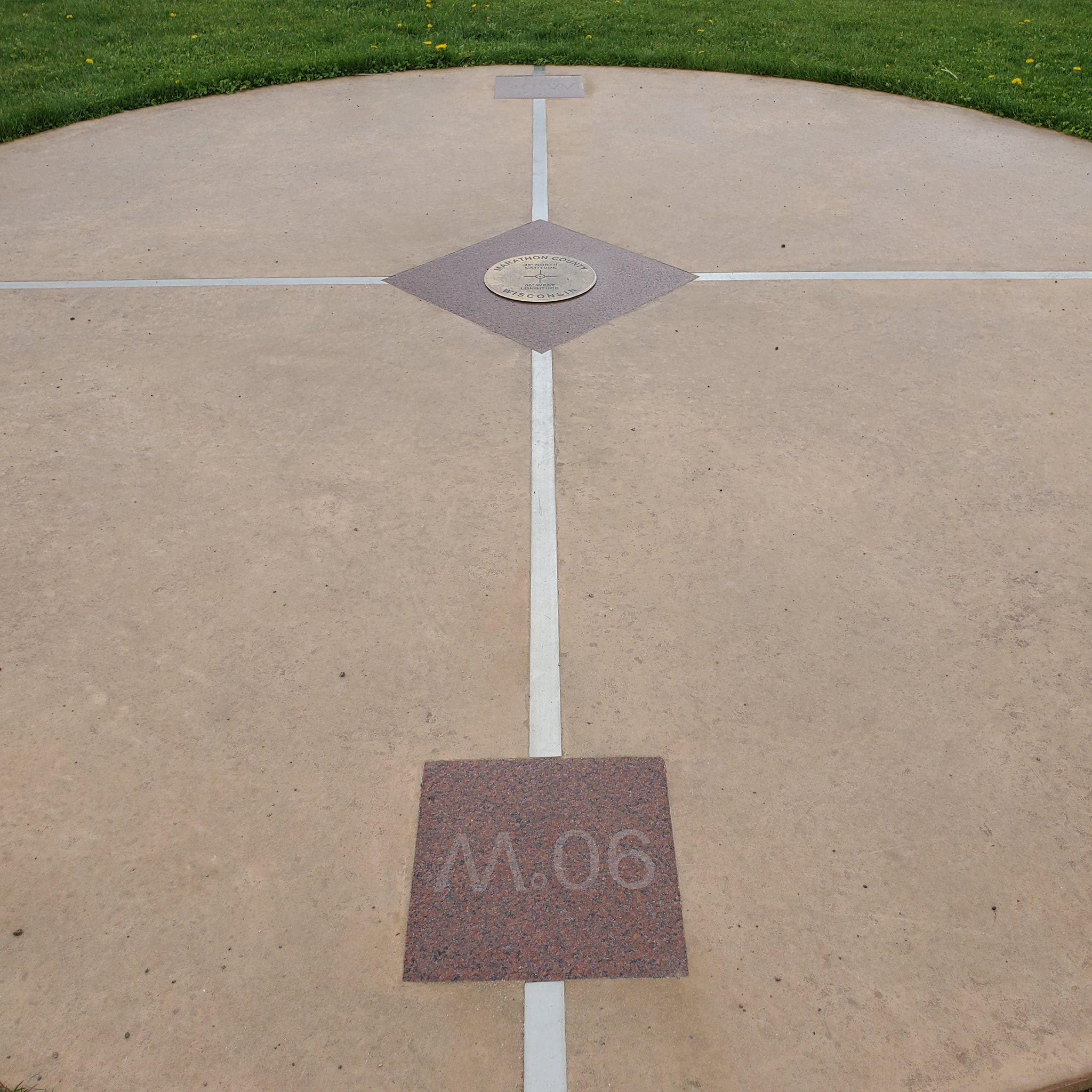
Image of the larger context for the 45°N × 90°W marker in Marathon County, Wisconsin, United States

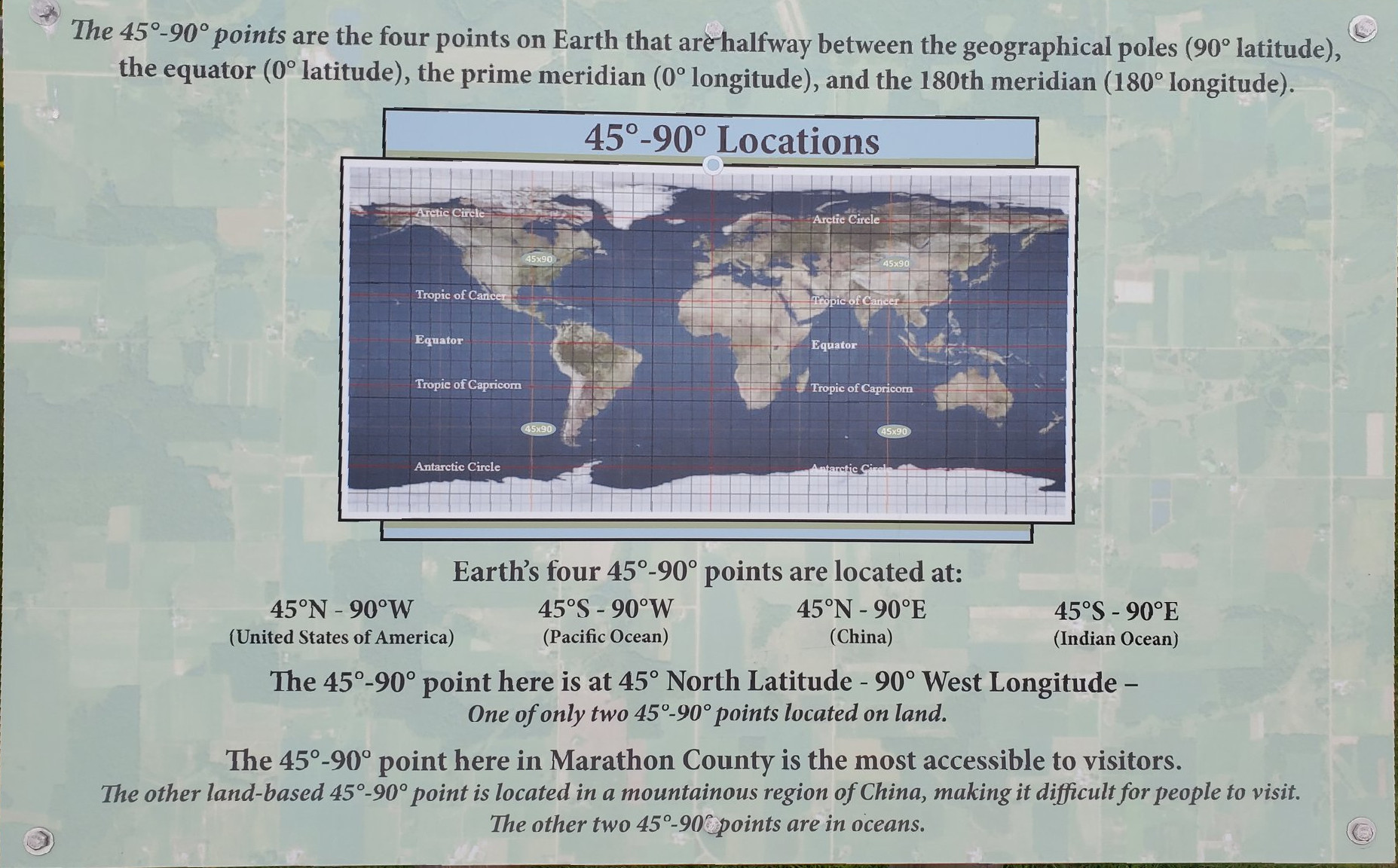
Image of 45°N × 90°W geographical marker informational display.

== 45°N, 90°E ==
The only other 45×90 point located on land is 45°0′0″N 90°0′0″E, which is at an elevation of 1,009 m (3,311 ft) above sea level. This point is located in a desolate region of the Xinjiang Uyghur Autonomous Region of China, near the Mongolian border, approximately 240 km (150 mi) northeast of Ürümqi. Administratively, it is on the border of Qitai and Qinggil counties. Greg Michaels, an American, and Ru Rong Zhao, a taxi driver from the closest town of Qitai, which is 110 km to the south-southwest, visited this point on April 13, 2004 and documented the visit on the Degree Confluence Project. Their visit found no monument or any physical recognition of the status and documented that the settlement nearest to the site documented on maps, Jiangjunmiao, had long since been abandoned.

== 45°S, 90°E ==
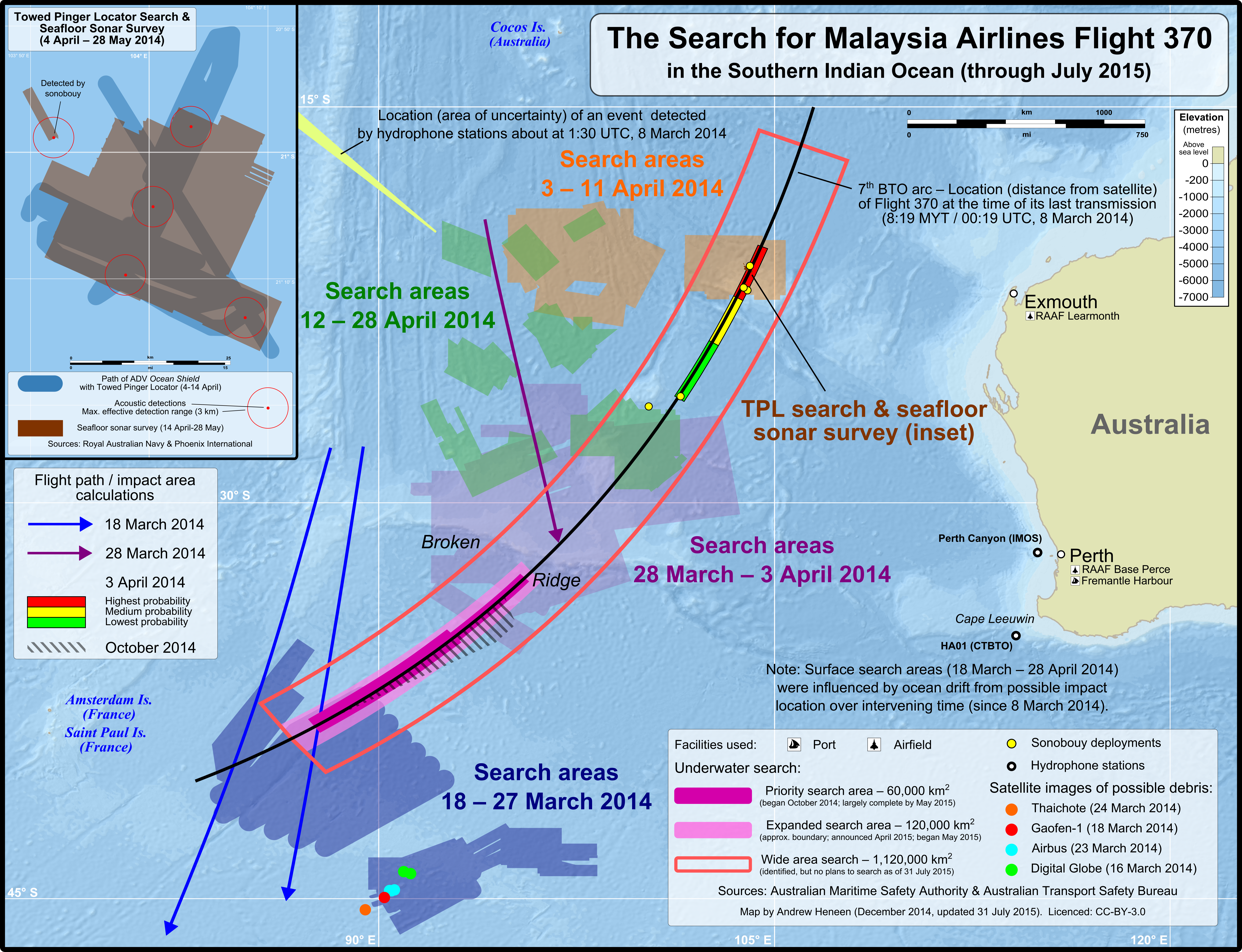
The search for Malaysia Airlines Flight 370 was near the coordinate 45°S, 90°E. The coordinate is closest to the red dot labeled as Gaofen 1 at the bottom, halfway between the center and left side of the image.

In the southern Indian Ocean, 45°0′0″S 90°0′0″E has an ocean floor depth of 3,197 m (10,489 ft) below sea level and is: 1,244 km (773 mi) southeast of the nearest (uninhabited) island of Île Saint-Paul; 1,480 km (920 mi) northeast of Elephant Spit, Heard Island; 1,569 km (975 mi) east northeast of the small village-like capital Port aux Français of the Kerguelen Islands; 2,425 km (1,507 mi) north of Antarctica; 2,448 km (1,521 mi) southwest of Augusta, Western Australia, 4,080 km (2,535 mi) southeast of Réunion Island, and 5,550 km (3,450 mi) southeast of Benguerra Island, Mozambique, and 5,800 km (3,600 mi) southeast of Mossel Bay, South Africa.

In March 2014, the point was in one of a few strips in a search for the missing Malaysia Airlines Flight 370, after potential debris was spotted by satellite about there.

== 45°S, 90°W ==
Located in the southern Pacific Ocean, 1,297 km (806 mi) west south west of Guaitecas in Chile, and 3,070 km (1,910 mi) north of Antarctica, 45°0′0″S 90°0′0″W has an ocean floor depth of 4,180 m (13,730 ft) below sea level.

== Antipodes ==
Each 45×90 point is the antipode – the point on the opposite side of Earth – of another 45×90 point.

The southern Indian Ocean location and the point in Wisconsin are antipodes of each other. The southern Pacific Ocean location and the point in China are antipodes of each other.

== See also ==
- Degree Confluence Project (DCP)
- 45th parallel north
- 45th parallel south
- 90th meridian east
- 90th meridian west
