= 90th meridian west =

Line of longitude

90th meridian west (interactive map)

The meridian 90° west of Greenwich is a line of longitudethat extends from the North Pole across the Arctic Ocean, North America, the Gulf of Mexico, Central America, the Pacific Ocean, the Southern Ocean, and Antarctica to the South Pole.

In Antarctica, the meridian defines the western limit of Chile's territorial claim. The land further west is not claimed by any nation. The meridian also defines the western limit of the Lima, Antofagasta, Santiago, Puerto Montt and Punta Arenas flight information regions.

The 90th meridian west forms a great ellipse with the 90th meridian east, located midway between the Prime meridian and the 180th meridian; thus, the center of the Western Hemisphere is on this meridian.

In the United States, the Mississippi River runs close to the 90th meridian, crossing the meridian several times. The cities of St. Louis, Memphis and New Orleans are all close to the meridian.

One of the four 45×90 points is located in Rietbrock, Wisconsin, where the 45th parallel north intersects with the 90th meridian west, marking the halfway point between the 90° Latitude North, 180th Meridian East & West, 0° latitude, and 0° longitude.

== From Pole to Pole ==
Starting at the North Pole and heading south to the South Pole, the 90th meridian west passes through:

Co-ordinates	Country, territory or sea	Notes
90°0′N 90°0′W	Arctic Ocean	
81°54′N 90°0′W	Canada	Nunavut — Ellesmere Island
81°1′N 90°0′W	Nansen Sound	
80°31′N 90°0′W	Canada	Nunavut — Axel Heiberg Island
78°17′N 90°0′W	Norwegian Bay	
77°22′N 90°0′W	Canada	Nunavut — Graham Island
77°13′N 90°0′W	Norwegian Bay	
76°50′N 90°0′W	Canada	Nunavut — North Kent Island and Devon Island
74°34′N 90°0′W	Barrow Strait	
74°4′N 90°0′W	Canada	Nunavut — Prince Leopold Island
73°59′N 90°0′W	Prince Regent Inlet	
72°4′N 90°0′W	Canada	Nunavut — Baffin Island
71°31′N 90°0′W	Gulf of Boothia	
69°7′N 90°0′W	Canada	Nunavut — several islands including Helen Island, and the mainland
63°46′N 90°0′W	Hudson Bay	
57°1′N 90°0′W	Canada	Manitoba; Ontario — from 56°13′N 90°0′W
48°3′N 90°0′W	United States	Minnesota
47°49′N 90°0′W	Lake Superior	
46°41′N 90°0′W	United States	Michigan; Wisconsin — from 46°19′N 90°0′W, passing through Reedsburg (at 43°32′N 90°0′W); crosses the 45th parallel north in Marathon County, Wisconsin, having one of the 45 x 90 points (at 45°00′N 90°00′W); Illinois — from 42°30′N 90°0′W; Missouri — from 37°58′N 90°0′W, passing a mile and a half (2 km) east of Ste. Genevieve; Arkansas — from 36°0′N 90°0′W; Tennessee — from 35°33′N 90°0′W, passing through Memphis (at 35°8′N 90°0′W); Mississippi — from 35°0′N 90°0′W, passing through Brandon (at 32°17′N 90°0′W) a suburb of Jackson; Louisiana — from 31°0′N 90°0′W, passing through New Orleans (at 30°2.5′N 90°0′W)
29°13′N 90°0′W	Gulf of Mexico	
21°10′N 90°0′W	Mexico	Yucatán; Campeche — from 20°28′N 90°0′W
17°49′N 90°0′W	Guatemala	Passing through Jalapa
13°57′N 90°0′W	El Salvador	Ahuachapán — Passing through of Western Tacuba district (at 13°54′N 90°0′W), Central San Francisco Menéndez district (at 13°50′N 90°00′W), and finishing the Barra de Santiago canton (at 13°41′N 90°0′W).
13°41′N 90°0′W	Pacific Ocean	Passing just west of Genovesa Island, Galápagos, Ecuador (at 0°19′N 89°58′W); Passing just east of Santa Fe Island, Galápagos, Ecuador (at 0°49′S 90°2′W)
60°0′S 90°0′W	Southern Ocean	
72°28′S 90°0′W	Antarctica	Border between unclaimed territory (to the west) and Antártica Chilena Province (to the east), claimed by Chile

Next westward: 91st meridian west	90th meridian west forms a great circle with 90th meridian east	Next eastward: 89th meridian west

== See also ==
- 89th meridian west
- 91st meridian west
- 90th meridian east
- 45×90 points
