= Newburg, Wisconsin =

Village in Ozaukee and Washington counties, Wisconsin

- Village
- Location of Newburg in Ozaukee/Washington County, Wisconsin.
- Coordinates: 43°25′53″N 88°2′51″W
- Country: United States
- State: Wisconsin
- Counties: Washington, Ozaukee
- Incorporated: 1973; 53 years ago

Government
  - Village President: Dave DeLuka
  - Village Administrator: Nate Wendelborn
  - Police Chief: Michael Foeger

Area
  - Total: 0.91 sq mi (2.36 km^{2})
  - Land: 0.91 sq mi (2.36 km^{2})
  - Water: 0 sq mi (0.00 km^{2})
- Elevation: 846 ft (258 m)

Population (2020)
  - Total: 1,142
  - Density: 1,250/sq mi (484/km^{2})
- Time zone: UTC-6 (Central (CST))
  - Summer (DST): UTC-5 (CDT)
- Area code: 262
- FIPS code: 55-56450
- GNIS feature ID: 1570249
- Website: newburgwi.gov

Newburg is a village in Ozaukee and Washington counties in the U.S. state of Wisconsin. The population was 1,142 at the 2020 census. Of this, 1,049 were in Washington County, and only 93 were in Ozaukee County.

== Geography ==
Newburg is located at 43°25′53″N 88°02′51″W (43.431440, -88.047631) on the Milwaukee River. According to the United States Census Bureau, the village has a total area of 0.91 square miles (2.36 km^{2}), all land.

== History ==
Like many of the cities and villages on the Milwaukee River, Newburg formed around a hydropowered mill. In 1848, village founder Barton Salisbury built a dam on the river to power his feed and saw mills. While Salisbury died in a construction accident in 1849, one mill operated until 1903; the other closed in 1939. The dam was replaced and repaired several times, before finally being demolished in 2011–12.

The village incorporated in 1973 from land in the towns of Saukville and Trenton. At the time of incorporation, the population was 634.

== Demographics ==
Historical population
Census	Pop.	Note	%±
1980	783		—
1990	875		11.7%
2000	1,119		27.9%
2010	1,254		12.1%
2020	1,142		−8.9%
U.S. Decennial Census

=== 2010 census ===
As of the census of 2010, there were 1,254 people, 480 households, and 327 families living in the village. The population density was 1,409.0 inhabitants per square mile (544.0/km^{2}). There were 506 housing units at an average density of 568.5 per square mile (219.5/km^{2}). The racial makeup of the village was 98.0% White, 0.2% African American, 0.3% Native American, 0.4% Asian, 0.3% from other races, and 0.8% from two or more races. Hispanic or Latino of any race were 1.1% of the population.

There were 480 households, of which 35.8% had children under the age of 18 living with them, 56.0% were married couples living together, 7.1% had a female householder with no husband present, 5.0% had a male householder with no wife present, and 31.9% were non-families. 24.6% of all households were made up of individuals, and 8.3% had someone living alone who was 65 years of age or older. The average household size was 2.60 and the average family size was 3.15.

The median age in the village was 37.6 years. 27.5% of residents were under the age of 18; 6.3% were between the ages of 18 and 24; 26.2% were from 25 to 44; 29.3% were from 45 to 64; and 10.9% were 65 years of age or older. The gender makeup of the village was 50.8% male and 49.2% female.

=== 2000 census ===
At the 2000 census, there were 1,119 people, 398 households and 296 families living in the village. The population density was 1,292.0 per square mile (496.6/km^{2}). There were 408 housing units at an average density of 471.1 per square mile (181.1/km^{2}). The racial makeup of the village was 97.32% White, 0.36% Native American, 0.27% Asian, 0.09% from other races, and 1.97% from two or more races. Hispanic or Latino of any race were 1.79% of the population.

There were 398 households, of which 41.0% had children under the age of 18 living with them, 61.8% were married couples living together, 8.3% had a female householder with no husband present, and 25.4% were non-families. 18.6% of all households were made up of individuals, and 6.5% had someone living alone who was 65 years of age or older. The average household size was 2.80 and the average family size was 3.22.

30.3% of the population were under the age of 18, 6.7% from 18 to 24, 37.8% from 25 to 44, 17.1% from 45 to 64, and 8.1% who were 65 years of age or older. The median age was 33 years. For every 100 females, there were 103.1 males. For every 100 females age 18 and over, there were 100.5 males.

The median household income was $56,726 and the median family income was $63,000. Males had a median income of $39,250 versus $27,222 for females. The per capita income for the village was $21,886. About 1.3% of families and 2.8% of the population were below the poverty line, including 3.9% of those under age 18 and 3.8% of those age 65 or over.

== Education ==
It is in the West Bend School District.

== Notable people ==
- Joseph Chesak, Wisconsin businessman and legislator; worked in Newburg.
- Gilbert Vandercook, Wisconsin newspaper editor, lawyer, and legislator; was born in Newburg.
