= Degree Confluence Project =

Online volunteer photography project

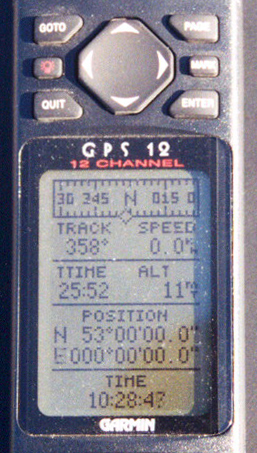
A GPS unit at confluence 53N 0, in Lincolnshire, England

The Degree Confluence Project is a World Wide Web-based all-volunteer project that aims to have people visit each of the integer degree intersections of latitude and longitude on Earth, posting photographs and a narrative of each visit online. The project describes itself as "an organized sampling of the world".

== Requirements ==
The precise location of each degree confluence uses the WGS 84 horizontal datum, and visitors to degree confluences almost always make use of GNSS receivers. For a successful visit, the visitor must get within 100 metres of the confluence point, and post a narrative and several photographs to the project website. A visit, or attempted visit, which does not conform to these rules may still be recorded on the website as an incomplete visit. The project encourages visits to degree confluences which have been visited previously, and many confluence points — especially in non-remote regions of developed nations – have been visited several times.

The total number of degree confluences is 64,442, of which 21,543 are on land, 38,409 on water, and 4,490 on the Antarctic and Arctic ice caps. The project categorizes degree confluences as either primary or secondary. A confluence is primary only if it is on land or within sight of land. In addition, at latitudes greater than 48°, only some points are designated primary because confluences crowd together near the poles. Both primary and secondary confluences may be visited and recorded.

In addition, visits to certain special geographical locations can also be reported (special visits). For example:

- Middle of the World monument (0°, 78°27'08"W)
- Centers of continents
- Royal Greenwich Observatory

== History ==
The project was started by Alex Jarrett in February 1996 because he "liked the idea of visiting a location represented by a round number such as 43°00'00"N 72°00'00"W. What would be there? Would other people have recognized this as a unique spot?"

As of October 2024, 6,668 (40.7%) of 16,349 primary confluences have been visited, covering 195 countries and territories.

== Milestones ==
- First degree confluence visit posted to the website: 43°N 72°W in New Hampshire, USA by Alex Jarrett (project founder) and Peter Cline on February 20, 1996. (Note that some degree confluence visits that pre-date this visit have since been posted on the project's website.)
- Highest confluence: 33°N 80°E in Kuba, Tibet, China at 19,143 feet (5,835 m), first visited by Greg Michaels and Robert Whitfield on May 29, 2005.
- Lowest confluence: 30°N 27°E in Matrūh, Egypt at −255 feet (−78 m), first visited by Dave Morrison, Steve Price and Tony Carlisle on December 4, 2004.

== See also ==
- Geocaching – Outdoor recreational activity
- Geograph Britain and Ireland – Archive of geographically located images in the United Kingdom and Ireland
- Geohashing – Outdoor recreational activity
- Geo-wiki – Collaborative land cover mapping wiki project
