= Poniatowski, Wisconsin =

Poniatowski
- Unincorporated community
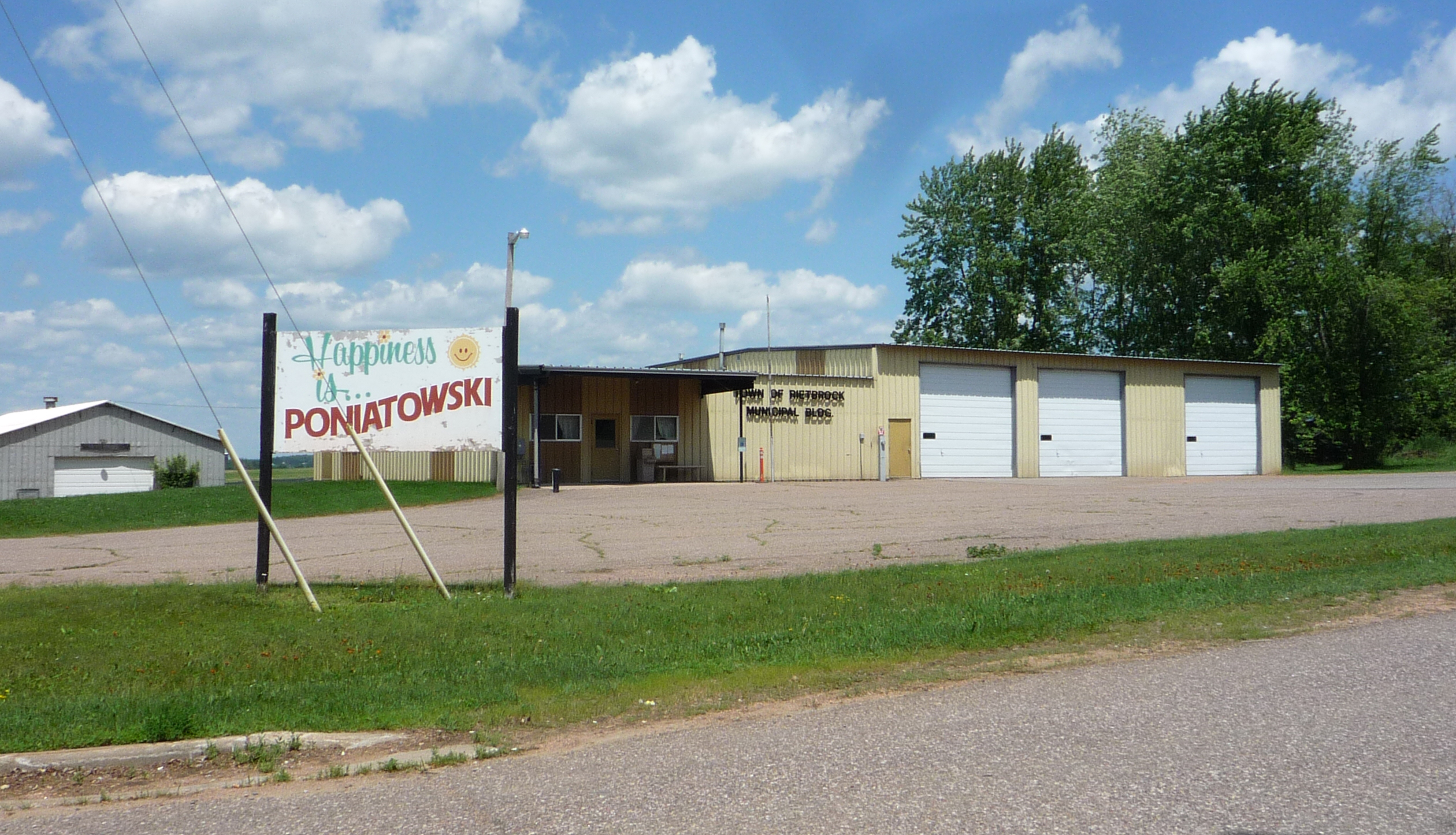
- Sign

- Location within the state of Wisconsin
- Coordinates: 44°59′41″N 89°59′39″W
- Country: United States
- State: Wisconsin
- County: Marathon
- Time zone: UTC-6 (Central (CST))
  - Summer (DST): UTC-5 (CDT)
- Area codes: 715 & 534

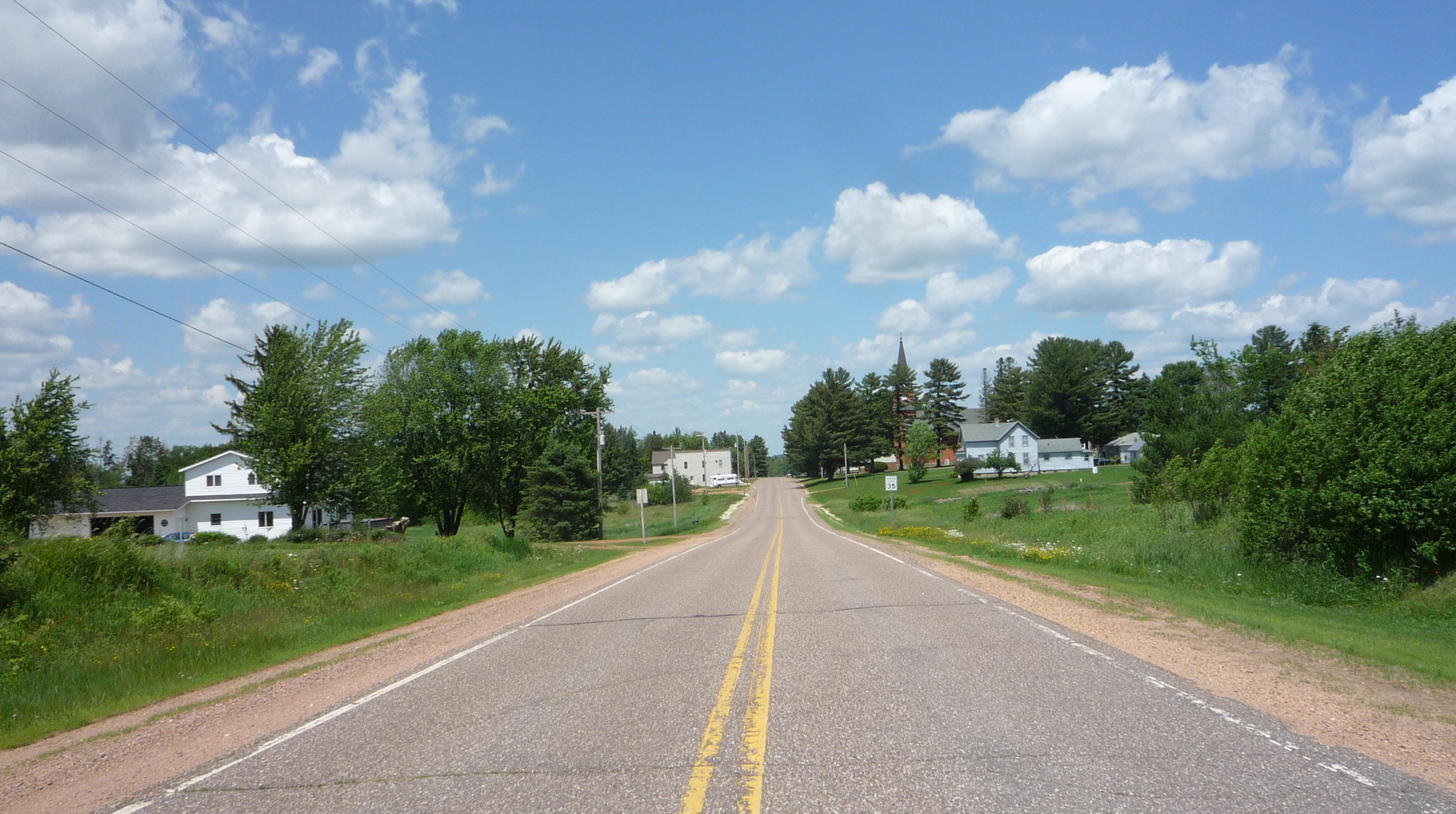
Poniatowski

Poniatowski is an unincorporated community, in the town of Rietbrock, Marathon County, Wisconsin, United States. The area is geographically notable for being less than one mile away from the 45°N, 90°W point. It is most likely named after a Polish royal family of the same name.

== Polish connection ==
Poniatowski is also being considered one of few undiscovered Polish communities due to the group of Polish settlers established their village after Rietbrock in 1879, naming after Polish leader and general Józef Poniatowski.

== Notable people ==
- Joseph Chesak, Wisconsin state legislator and businessman, owned a store in Poniatowski.
