= 91st meridian west =

Line of longitude

91st meridian west

The meridian 91° west of Greenwich is a line of longitude that extends from the North Pole across the Arctic Ocean, North America, the Gulf of Mexico, Central America, the Pacific Ocean, the Southern Ocean, and Antarctica to the South Pole.

The 91st meridian west forms a great ellipse with the 89th meridian east.

== From Pole to Pole ==
Starting at the North Pole and heading south to the South Pole, the 91st meridian west passes through:

| Co-ordinates | Country, territory or sea | Notes |
|---|---|---|
| 90°0′N 91°0′W | Arctic Ocean | |
| 81°49′N 91°0′W | Canada | Nunavut — Ellesmere Island |
| 81°32′N 91°0′W | Nansen Sound | |
| 80°43′N 91°0′W | Canada | Nunavut — Axel Heiberg Island |
| 78°8′N 91°0′W | Norwegian Bay | |
| 77°38′N 91°0′W | Canada | Nunavut — Graham Island and Buckingham Island |
| 77°8′N 91°0′W | Norwegian Bay | |
| 76°39′N 91°0′W | Canada | Nunavut — Devon Island |
| 74°42′N 91°0′W | Parry Channel | Barrow Strait |
| 74°0′N 91°0′W | Canada | Nunavut — Somerset Island |
| 73°27′N 91°0′W | Prince Regent Inlet | |
| 71°30′N 91°0′W | Gulf of Boothia | |
| 69°37′N 91°0′W | Canada | Nunavut — mainland |
| 62°56′N 91°0′W | Hudson Bay | |
| 62°40′N 91°0′W | Canada | Nunavut — Marble Island |
| 62°39′N 91°0′W | Hudson Bay | |
| 57°16′N 91°0′W | Canada | Manitoba; Ontario — from 55°35′N 91°0′W |
| 48°12′N 91°0′W | United States | Minnesota |
| 47°28′N 91°0′W | Lake Superior | |
| 46°55′N 91°0′W | United States | Wisconsin; Iowa — from 42°43′N 91°0′W; Illinois — from 41°26′N 91°0′W; Iowa — from 41°9′N 91°0′W; Illinois — from 40°53′N 91°0′W; Missouri — from 39°25′N 91°0′W; Arkansas — from 36°30′N 91°0′W; Mississippi — from 33°58′N 91°0′W; Arkansas — for about 2 km from 33°47′N 91°0′W on Beulah Island Number 74; Mississippi — from 33°46′N 91°0′W; Louisiana — from 32°26′N 91°0′W; Mississippi — for about 4 km from 32°23′N 91°0′W; Louisiana — from 32°21′N 91°0′W; Mississippi — from 32°11′N 91°0′W; Louisiana — from 31°0′N 91°0′W |
| 29°10′N 91°0′W | Gulf of Mexico | |
| 19°7′N 91°0′W | Mexico | Campeche; Tabasco — from 17°57′N 91°0′W, mostly running roughly parallel to the border with Guatemala, which is about 2 km further east |
| 17°15′N 91°0′W | Guatemala | |
| 16°53′N 91°0′W | Mexico | Chiapas |
| 16°4′N 91°0′W | Guatemala | |
| 13°55′N 91°0′W | Pacific Ocean | Passing just west of Pinta Island, Galápagos, Ecuador (at 0°36′N 90°47′W); Passing just west of Santiago Island, Galápagos, Ecuador (at 0°15′S 90°52′W) |
| 0°23′S 91°0′W | Ecuador | Isabela Island, Galápagos |
| 0°58′S 91°0′W | Pacific Ocean | |
| 60°0′S 91°0′W | Southern Ocean | Passing just west of Peter I Island, claimed by Norway (at 68°47′S 90°43′W) |
| 72°32′S 91°0′W | Antarctica | Unclaimed territory |

== See also ==
- 90th meridian west
- 92nd meridian west
