= 89th meridian east =

Line of longitude

89th meridian east

The meridian 89° east of Greenwich is a line of longitude that extends from the North Pole across the Arctic Ocean, Asia, the Indian Ocean, the Southern Ocean, and Antarctica to the South Pole.

The 89th meridian east forms a great ellipse with the 91st meridian west.

== From Pole to Pole ==
Starting at the North Pole and heading south to the South Pole, the 89th meridian east passes through:

Co-ordinates	Country, territory or sea	Notes
90°0′N 89°0′E	Arctic Ocean	
81°9′N 89°0′E	Kara Sea	
77°8′N 89°0′E	Russia	Krasnoyarsk Krai — Kirov Islands
76°58′N 89°0′E	Kara Sea	
75°26′N 89°0′E	Russia	Krasnoyarsk Krai; Tomsk Oblast — from 57°58′N 89°0′E; Krasnoyarsk Krai — from 57°30′N 89°0′E; Kemerovo Oblast — from 56°18′N 89°0′E; Krasnoyarsk Krai — from 55°41′N 89°0′E; Republic of Khakassia — from 55°19′N 89°0′E; Kemerovo Oblast — from 54°18′N 89°0′E; Republic of Khakassia — from 53°41′N 89°0′E; Kemerovo Oblast — from 53°17′N 89°0′E; Republic of Khakassia — from 53°4′N 89°0′E; Kemerovo Oblast — from 52°58′N 89°0′E; Republic of Khakassia — from 52°32′N 89°0′E; Tuva Republic — from 51°34′N 89°0′E; Altai Republic — from 51°11′N 89°0′E
49°29′N 89°0′E	Mongolia	
48°4′N 89°0′E	People's Republic of China	Xinjiang; Tibet — from 36°19′N 89°0′E
27°30′N 89°0′E	Bhutan	
26°56′N 89°0′E	India	West Bengal
26°25′N 89°0′E	Bangladesh	For about 13 km
26°18′N 89°0′E	India	West Bengal - for about 7 km
26°14′N 89°0′E	Bangladesh	
25°19′N 89°0′E	India	West Bengal - for about 4 km
25°16′N 89°0′E	Bangladesh	
22°28′N 89°0′E	India	West Bengal - for about 6 km
22°25′N 89°0′E	Bangladesh	For about 11 km
22°19′N 89°0′E	India	West Bengal
21°37′N 89°0′E	Indian Ocean	
60°0′S 89°0′E	Southern Ocean	
66°20′S 89°0′E	Antarctica	Australian Antarctic Territory, claimed by Australia

Next westward: 88th meridian east	89th meridian east forms a great circle with 91st meridian west	Next eastward: 90th meridian east
