= East Junggar coalfield =

- Location: Xinjiang, China
- Products: Coal

The East Junggar is a large coal field located in the north of China in Xinjiang. East Junggar represents one of the largest coal reserve in China having estimated reserves of 390 billion tonnes of coal.
