= 45th parallel north =

Circle of latitude

45th parallel north (interactive map)

The 45th parallel north is a circle of latitude that is 45 degrees north of Earth's equator. It crosses Europe, Asia, the Pacific Ocean, North America, and the Atlantic Ocean. The 45th parallel north is often called the halfway point between the equator and the North Pole, but the true halfway point is 16.0 km (9.9 mi) north of it (approximately between 45°08'39" and 45°08'40") because Earth is an oblate geoid; that is, it bulges at the equator and is flattened at the poles.

At this latitude, the sun is visible for 15 hours 37 minutes during the summer solstice, and 8 hours 46 minutes during the winter solstice. The midday Sun stands 21.6° above the southern horizon at the December solstice, 68.4° at the June solstice, and exactly 45.0° at either equinox.

== Around the world ==
Starting at the Prime Meridian and heading eastwards, the parallel 45° north passes through:

Coordinates	Country, territory or sea	Notes
45°0′N 0°0′E	France	Aquitaine; Midi-Pyrénées; Limousin; Auvergne; Rhône-Alpes – passing just south of Grenoble
45°0′N 6°44′E	Italy	Piedmont – passing just south of Turin; Lombardy - passing by Voghera and Mantua; Emilia-Romagna – passing just south of Piacenza; Lombardy; Veneto – passing just south of Rovigo
45°0′N 12°27′E	Adriatic Sea	Gulf of Venice
45°0′N 13°44′E	Croatia	Istrian Peninsula, islands of Cres and Krk, and the mainland again
45°0′N 15°46′E	Bosnia and Herzegovina	
45°0′N 18°44′E	Croatia	
45°0′N 19°6′E	Serbia	Passing through the centre of Ruma and through northern part of Sremska Mitrovica; Passing through the northern edge of Stara Pazova, 30 kilometres NW of Belgrade
45°0′N 21°24′E	Romania	Passing just north of Ploiești and just south of Târgu Jiu and Râmnicu Vâlcea
45°0′N 29°39′E	Black Sea	
45°0′N 33°36′E	Crimea	Controlled by Russia, claimed by Ukraine – passing just north of Simferopol, and just south of Feodosiya
45°0′N 35°24′E	Black Sea	
45°0′N 37°13′E	Russia	Passing just south of Krasnodar, and just south of Stavropol
45°0′N 47°15′E	Caspian Sea	
45°0′N 51°4′E	Kazakhstan	Mangystau Province
45°0′N 56°0′E	Uzbekistan	Karakalpakstan (autonomous republic) – including Vozrozhdeniya Island in the Aral Sea
45°0′N 59°50′E	Kazakhstan	Kyzylorda Province; South Kazakhstan Province; Zhambyl Province; Almaty Province
45°0′N 80°2′E	China	Xinjiang – passing through a 45×90 point (halfway between the North Pole and the Equator, and halfway between the Prime Meridian and the 180th meridian)
45°0′N 93°13′E	Mongolia	Govi-Altai Province; Bayankhongor Province; Övörkhangai Province; Dundgovi Province; Dornogovi Province
45°0′N 111°46′E	China	Inner Mongolia
45°0′N 112°31′E	Mongolia	Sükhbaatar Province
45°0′N 114°7′E	China	Inner Mongolia; Jilin; Heilongjiang
45°0′N 131°30′E	Russia	Primorsky Krai - passing through Lake Khanka
45°0′N 136°37′E	Sea of Japan	Passing just south of Rishiri Island, Japan
45°0′N 141°41′E	Japan	Hokkaidō - Horonobe, Hokkaido, Japan
45°0′N 142°32′E	Sea of Okhotsk	
45°0′N 147°31′E	Kuril Islands	Island of Iturup, administered by Russia, claimed by Japan
45°0′N 147°59′E	Pacific Ocean	
45°0′N 124°1′W	United States	Oregon – passing north of Lincoln City and Salem, and south of North Powder; Idaho – passing north of New Meadows, through Brundage Mountain ski area, and south of Salmon; Montana – passing through Clark Canyon Dam (south of Dillon); Montana / Wyoming border South Dakota – passing through Eagle Butte and Watertown; Minnesota – passing through northern Minneapolis and northern suburbs of St Paul; Wisconsin – passing north of Chippewa Falls and near Wausau (at a 45×90 point, halfway between the North Pole and Equator, halfway between the Prime Meridian and 180th meridian, at Rietbrock).
45°0′N 87°37′W	Lake Michigan	Green Bay – territorial waters of the United States
45°0′N 87°21′W	United States	Wisconsin – passing across northern Door Peninsula, south of Baileys Harbor
45°0′N 87°9′W	Lake Michigan	Territorial waters of the United States
45°0′N 86°9′W	United States	Michigan – South Manitou Island
45°0′N 86°5′W	Lake Michigan	Territorial waters of the United States
45°0′N 85°46′W	United States	Michigan – Leelanau Peninsula (Leelanau County)
45°0′N 86°5′W	Lake Michigan	Grand Traverse Bay – territorial waters of the United States
45°0′N 85°47′W	United States	Michigan – passing through southern Gaylord and south of Alpena
45°0′N 83°26′W	Lake Huron	Territorial waters of the United States and Canada
45°0′N 81°27′W	Canada	Ontario – Bruce Peninsula
45°0′N 81°11′W	Lake Huron	Georgian Bay – territorial waters of Canada
45°0′N 79°59′W	Canada	Ontario – passing south of Bala, through Browning Island in Lake Muskoka, south of Bracebridge and south of Kemptville
45°0′N 74°54′W	United States	New York state – for about six miles (10 km)
45°0′N 74°46′W	Canada	Ontario – Cornwall Island; Quebec – running just north of the border with New York, United States
45°0′N 73°54′W	United States	New York – running just south of the border with Quebec, Canada; Vermont – running just south of the border with Quebec, Canada; New Hampshire – passing through Stewartstown; Maine – passing just south of Dexter
45°0′N 67°4′W	Passamaquoddy Bay	
45°0′N 67°0′W	Canada	Deer Island, New Brunswick
45°0′N 66°57′W	Bay of Fundy	Territorial waters of Canada
45°0′N 65°10′W	Canada	Nova Scotia – passing just north of Fort Edward
45°0′N 61°57′W	Atlantic Ocean	
45°0′N 1°12′W	France	Aquitaine – passing just north of Bordeaux

== Europe ==
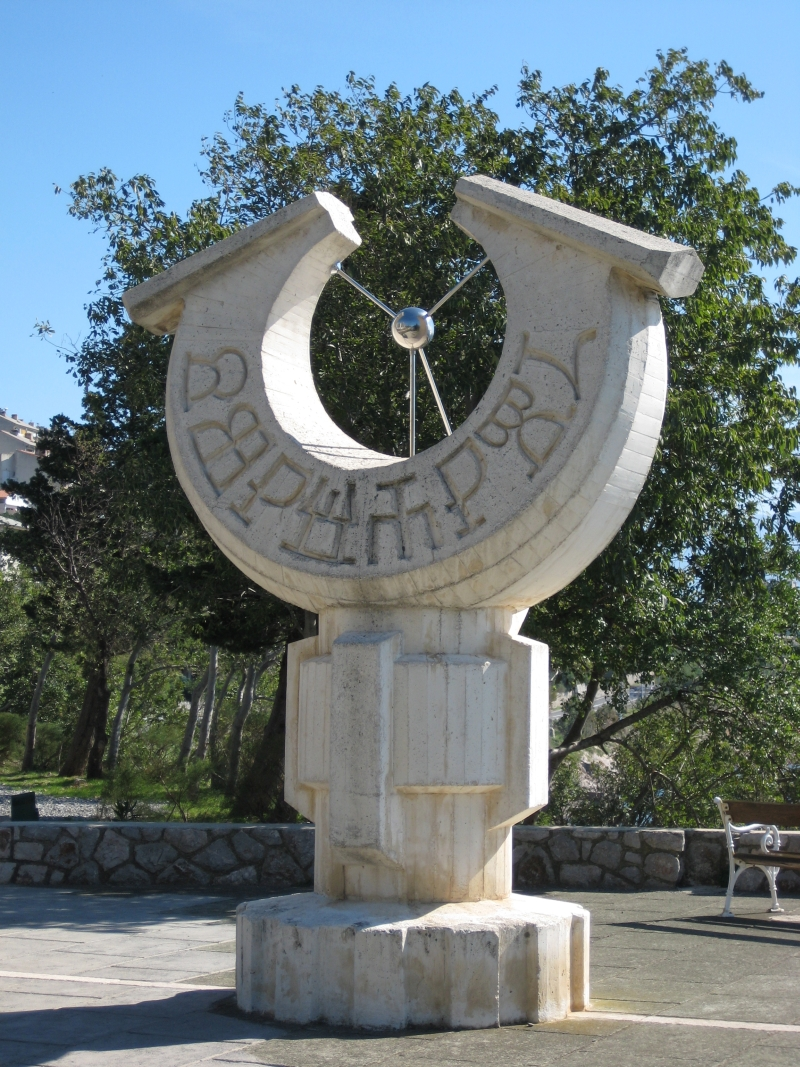
Sundial at the 45th parallel in Senj, Croatia.

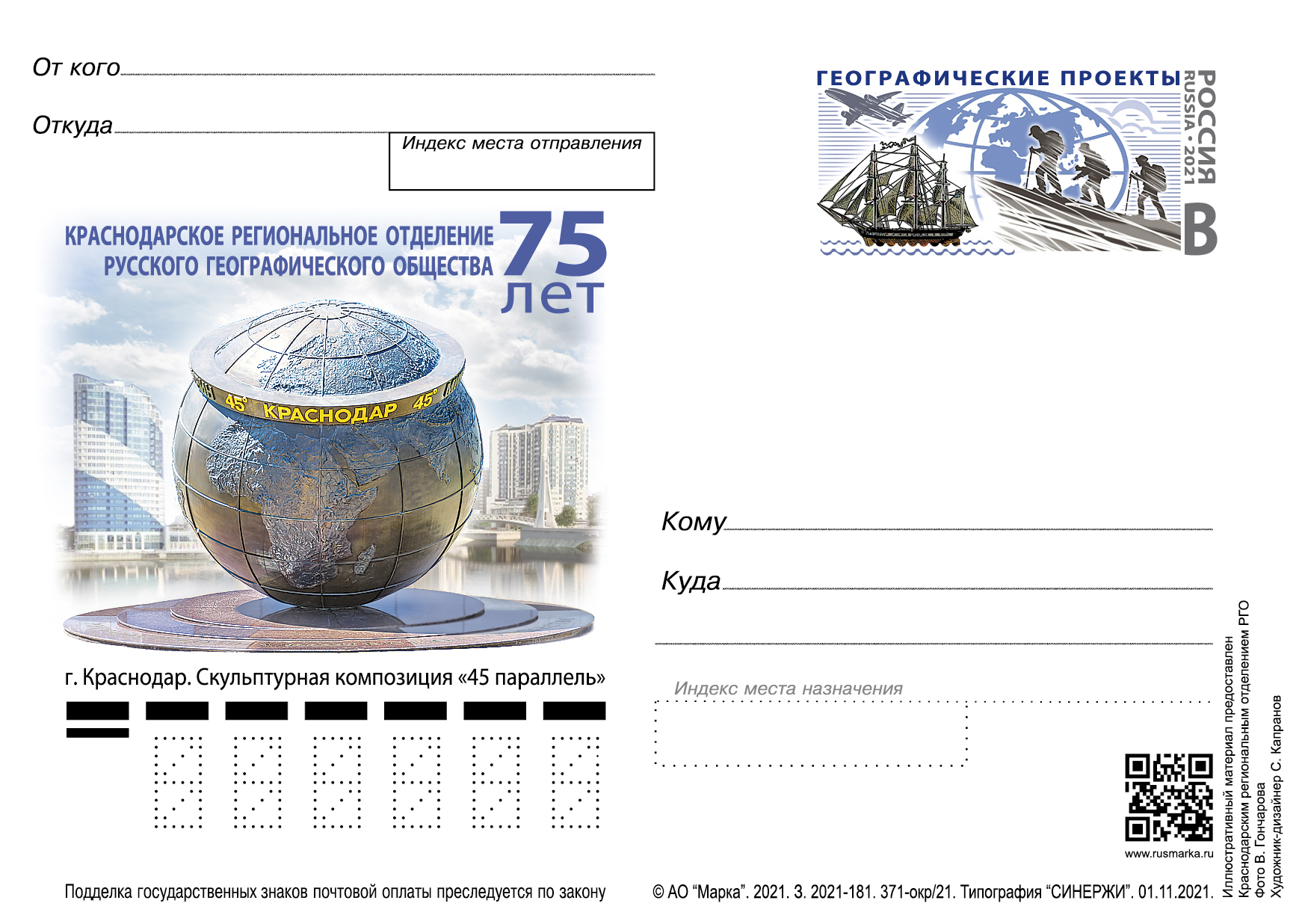
The mark at the 45th parallel in Krasnodar, Russia on postal card.

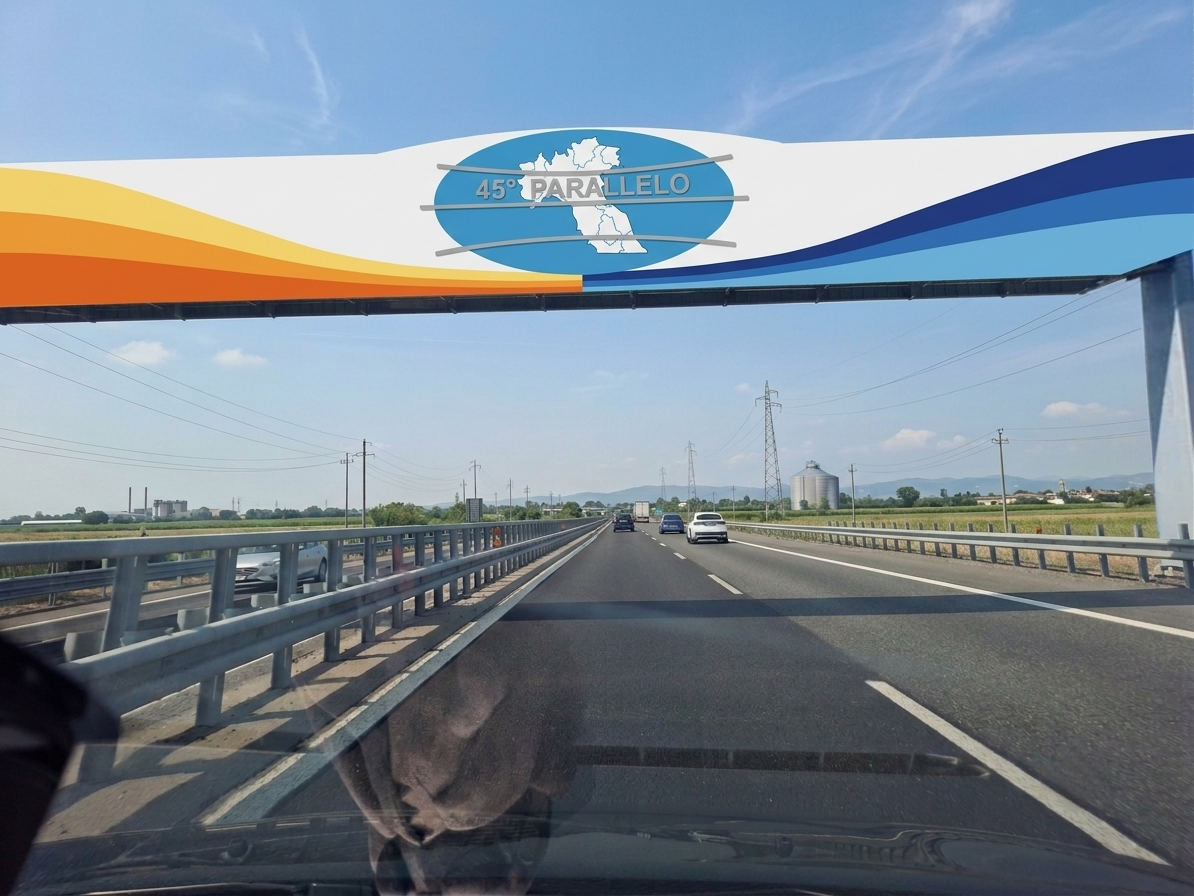
The 45th parallel in Italy: the A21 motorway near Voghera, in the Province of Pavia, Lombardy.

In Europe the 45th parallel hits the Bay of Biscay coast of France in the west. The city of Bordeaux is just south of the parallel. East of Bordeaux, in the municipality of Saint Seurin sur l'Isle, it intersects the Prime Meridian in the corner of an unremarkable field by the side of the A89 highway. There is a small sign indicating this particular point on the parallel. Further east, the parallel then continues across the Massif Central and crosses the river Rhône at Pont-de-l'Isère, just north of Valence, Drôme and through Grenoble in the Auvergne-Rhône-Alpes region.

In northern Italy it parallels the river Po, near Rovigo, passing by the southern province of Mantova, Piacenza in Emilia-Romagna, Voghera, then just south of Turin, precisely in Chieri, before passing into France in the Cottian Alps.

Further east it passes through the Balkans: Romania (just north of Ploiești, and through Târgu Jiu), the Serbian autonomous province of Vojvodina, the eastern tip of Croatia, the northern edge of Bosnia and Herzegovina, and a section of Adriatic Croatia. The capital city of Serbia – Belgrade is just south of the parallel.

In Russia it runs from the west coast of the Caspian Sea to the east coast of the Black Sea, through the Republic of Kalmykia, Stavropol Krai and its capital Stavropol, and Krasnodar Krai and its capital Krasnodar. In Ukraine it crosses the Crimea and its capital Simferopol.

== Asia ==
After leaving Russia the parallel passes through southern Kazakhstan, skirting the northern edge of the Ustyurt Plateau. It intersects the city of Burylbaytal at the southern tip of Lake Balkhash and the city of Qyzylorda further west. At the border with Uzbekistan it bisects the Aral Sea and its toxic Vozrozhdeniya Island peninsula, site of an abandoned Soviet bioweapons laboratory.

In northwest China it passes through the Ili Kazakh Autonomous Prefecture in Xinjiang and the oil city of Karamay. Transecting southern Mongolia it passes through the provinces of Sükhbaatar, Dornogovi (and its capital Sainshand), Dundgovi, Övörkhangai, Bayankhongor, Govi-Altai, and Khovd. At Khanka Lake it enters northeast China, cutting across Heilongjiang and continuing through part of Jilin and eastern Inner Mongolia.

It leaves the Asian mainland on the coast of Primorsky Krai in Russia, north of Vladivostok and continues through the northern part of the Sea of Japan. It passes through Rishiri-Rebun-Sarobetsu National Park and the adjacent town of Horonobe on the northern tip of Hokkaidō, the northernmost of Japan's main islands, before heading east across the North Pacific Ocean.

== North America ==
The part of the 45th parallel called the Collins–Valentine line defines part of the international border between Quebec, Canada, and New York and Vermont, United States.

The 45th parallel defines most of the border between Montana and Wyoming in the United States.

Throughout the United States the parallel is marked in many places on highways by a sign proclaiming that the location is halfway between the North Pole and the equator. (Note: Due to the fact that the Earth's equatorial radius is not exactly the same as its polar radius, the 45th parallel line is not exactly half way between the equator and the north pole when traversing the surface of the Earth. The 45th parallel line represents a perfect angle bisector between the equator and the north pole when seen from the Earth's center. See this image of a sign on the 45th parallel south for exact distance values.)

The 45th parallel forms some boundaries of or passes through many U.S. states: Oregon, Idaho, Montana, Wyoming, South Dakota, Minnesota, Wisconsin, Michigan, New York, Vermont, New Hampshire and Maine, as well as going through the Canadian provinces of Ontario, Quebec, New Brunswick and Nova Scotia. The parallel once formed the northern boundary of the original Colony of Virginia, as outlined in the London Company charter.

Going from west to east, the line makes landfall at the Pacific coast in Oregon. After crossing Idaho and the Rocky Mountains, it makes up most of the boundary between Montana and Wyoming. It then passes through the Great Plains and continues further East directly through Minneapolis, MN.

In Michigan, the Old Mission Peninsula in Grand Traverse Bay ends just shy of the 45th parallel. Many guidebooks and signs at the Mission Point Lighthouse describe it as being halfway between the equator and north pole. When the Grand Traverse Bay recedes below normal level, it is possible to walk out to the exact line.

Further east, the 45th parallel roughly marks the Canada–United States border between the St. Lawrence and Connecticut rivers, between the Canadian province of Quebec and the states of New York and Vermont. The parallel is sometimes called the "Canada line" or the Collins–Valentine line. After the Seven Years' War, the 45th parallel was declared the boundary between New York and Quebec. Under the Webster–Ashburton Treaty of 1842, original measurement errors stand so that the boundary is not exactly at 45 degrees north but is where the survey monuments were erected in 1772. The actual boundary of Vermont lies approximately 1 kilometre (3,300 ft) north of the parallel due to an error in the 1772 survey.

All of mainland New Brunswick lies north of the 45th parallel. Approximately two-thirds of Deer Island, plus all of Campobello and Grand Manan islands, are south of the 45th parallel.

The parallel roughly bisects mainland Nova Scotia. Halifax is approximately 40 km (25 mi) south of the parallel.

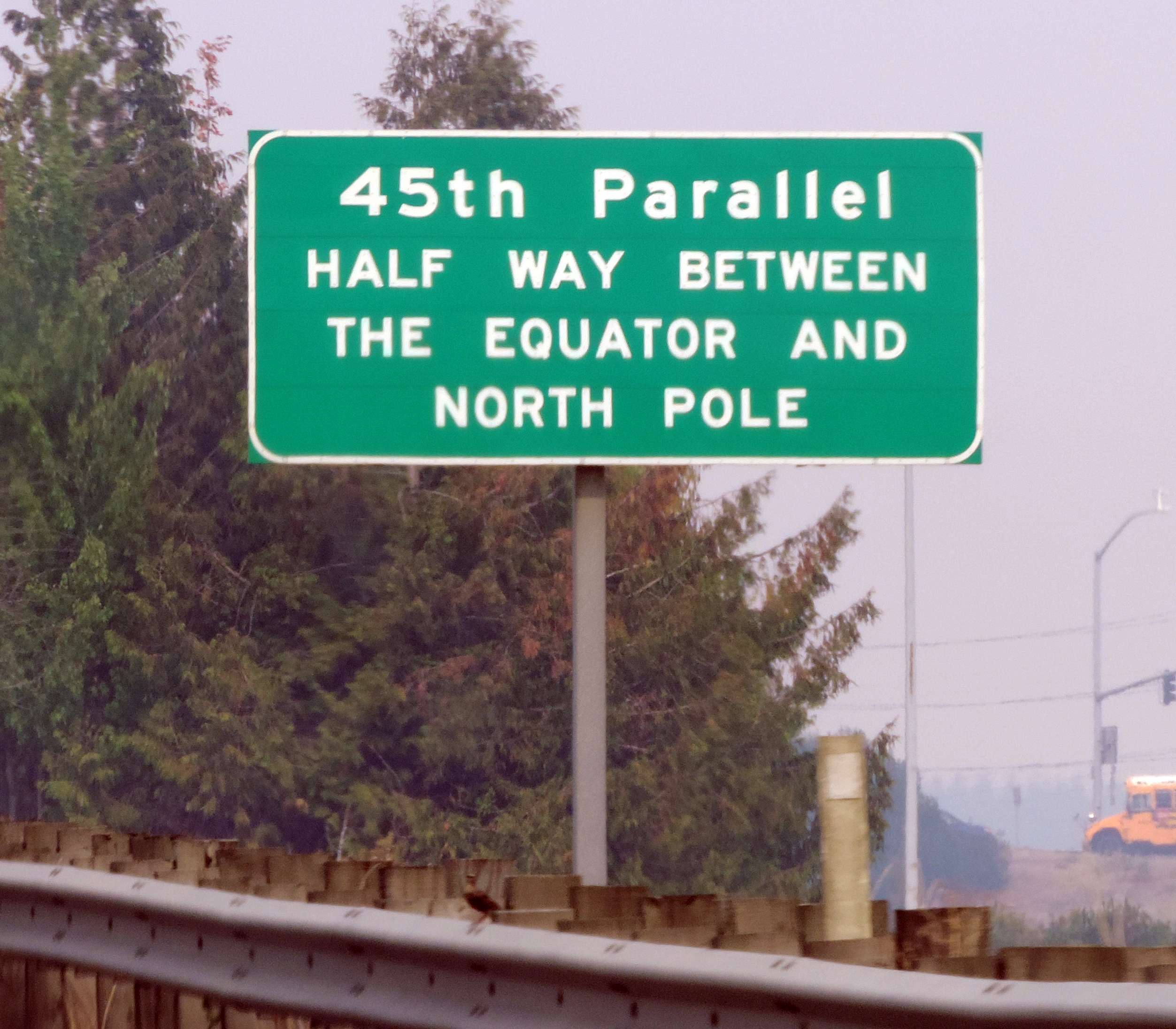
Marker on Interstate 5 near Keizer, Oregon

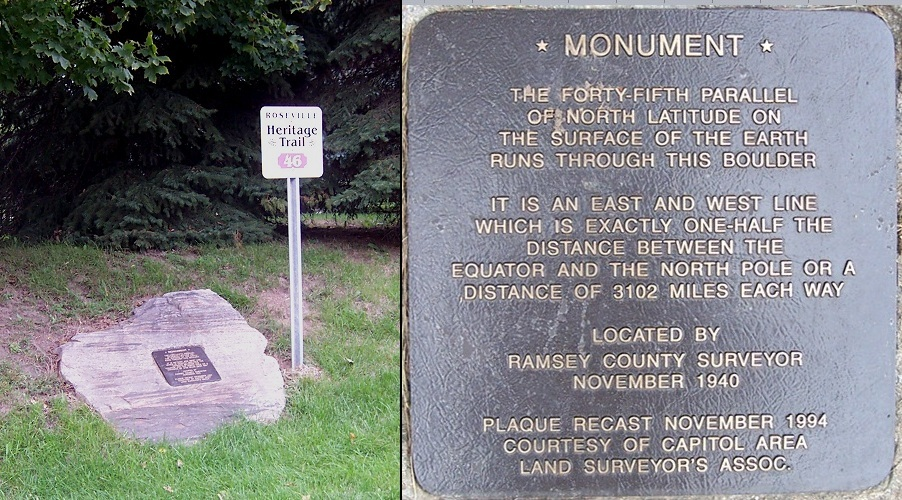
45th parallel marker in Roseville, Minnesota, a suburb of St Paul

== See also ==
- 45th parallel south
- 44th parallel north
- 46th parallel north
- 45×90 points
