= Rietbrock, Wisconsin =

Town of Rietbrock
- Town
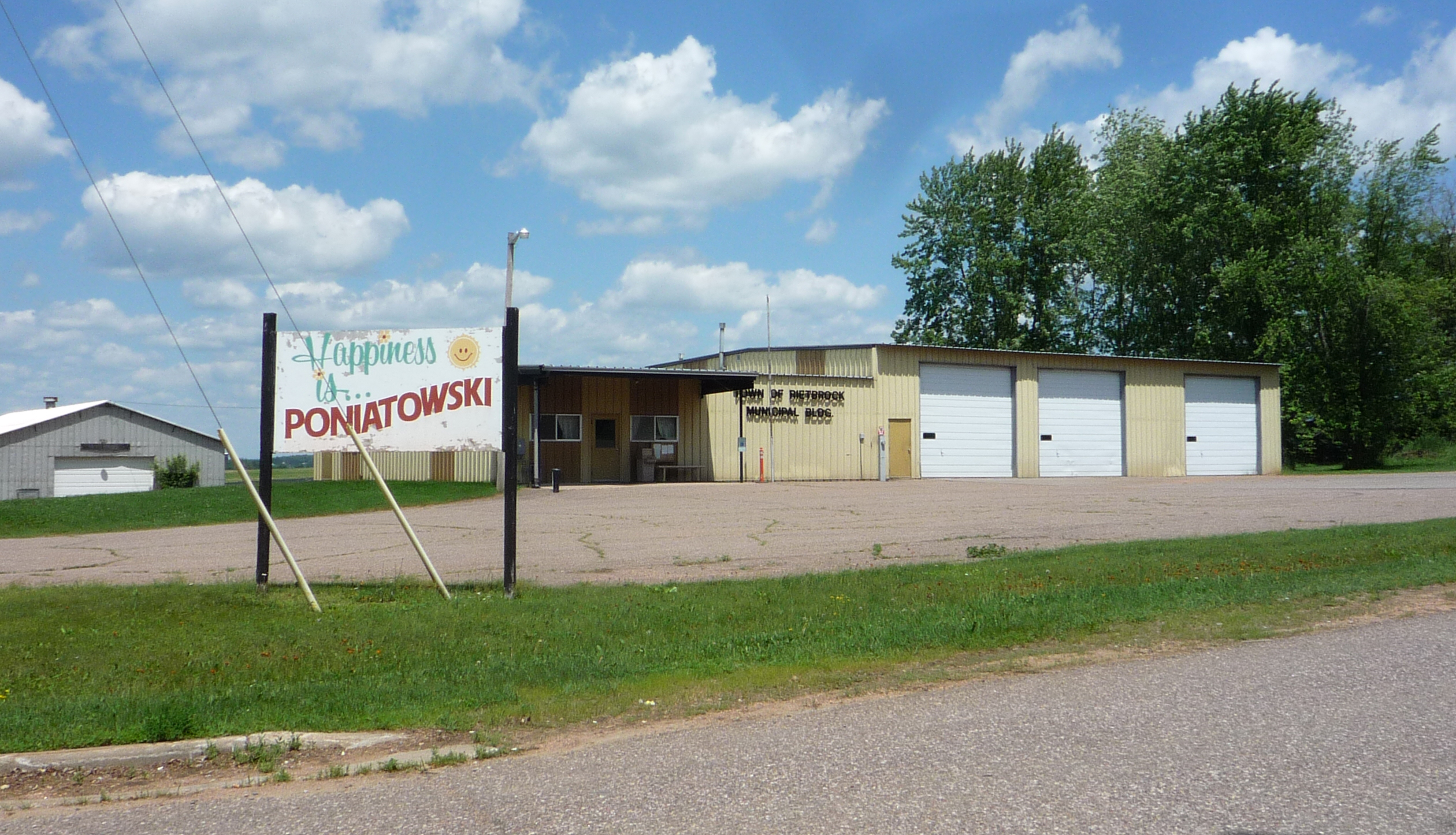
- Rietbrock Municipal Building, Poniatowski

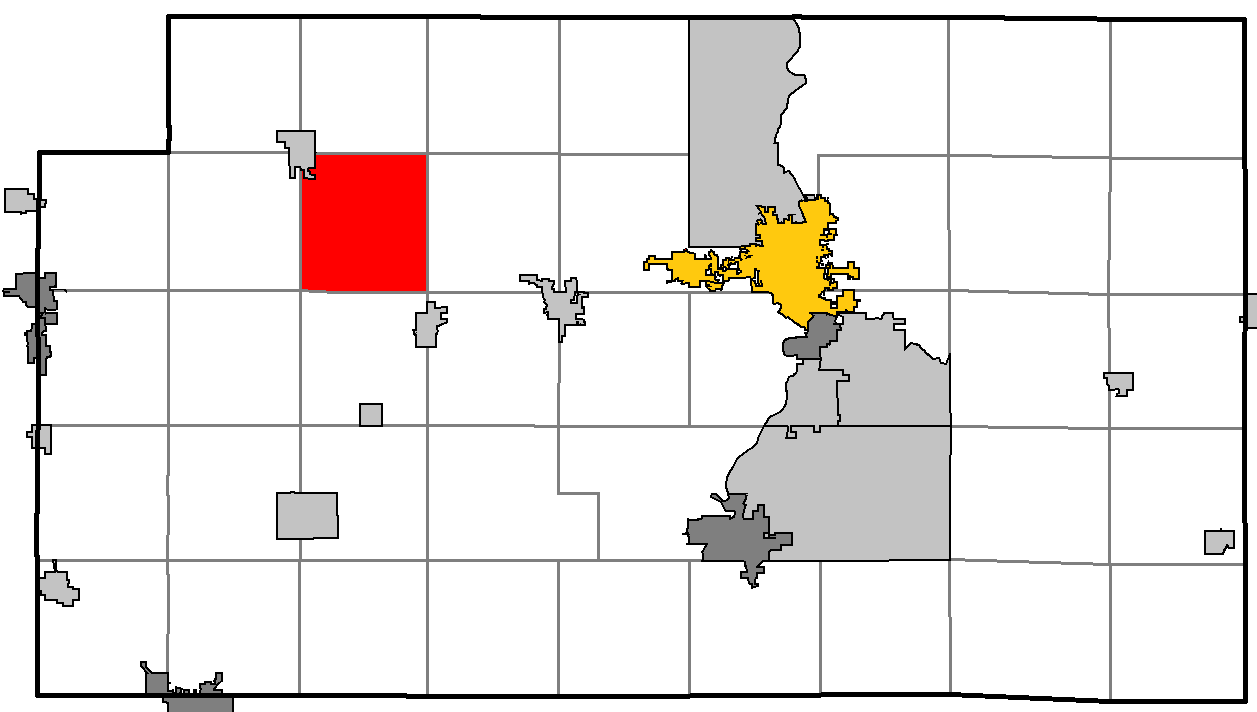
- Location of the Town of Rietbrock, Marathon County

- Location of Marathon County, Wisconsin
- Coordinates: 44°58′58″N 90°0′43″W
- Country: United States
- State: Wisconsin
- County: Marathon

Area
  - Total: 33.8 sq mi (87.6 km^{2})
  - Land: 33.8 sq mi (87.6 km^{2})
  - Water: 0 sq mi (0.0 km^{2})
- Elevation: 1,404 ft (428 m)

Population (2020)
  - Total: 874
  - Density: 25.8/sq mi (9.98/km^{2})
- Time zone: UTC-6 (Central (CST))
  - Summer (DST): UTC-5 (CDT)
- Area codes: 715 & 534
- FIPS code: 55-67950
- GNIS feature ID: 1584036
- Website: https://www.townofrietbrock.com/

The Town of Rietbrock is located in Marathon County, Wisconsin, United States. It is part of the Wausau, WI Metropolitan Statistical Area. The town contains one of the four 45×90 points of the world, where the 45th parallel north and 90th meridian west intersect. The population was 874 at the 2020 census. The unincorporated communities of Poniatowski and Schnappsville are located within the town.

== Geography ==
According to the United States Census Bureau, the town has a total area of 33.8 square miles (87.5 km^{2}), all land.

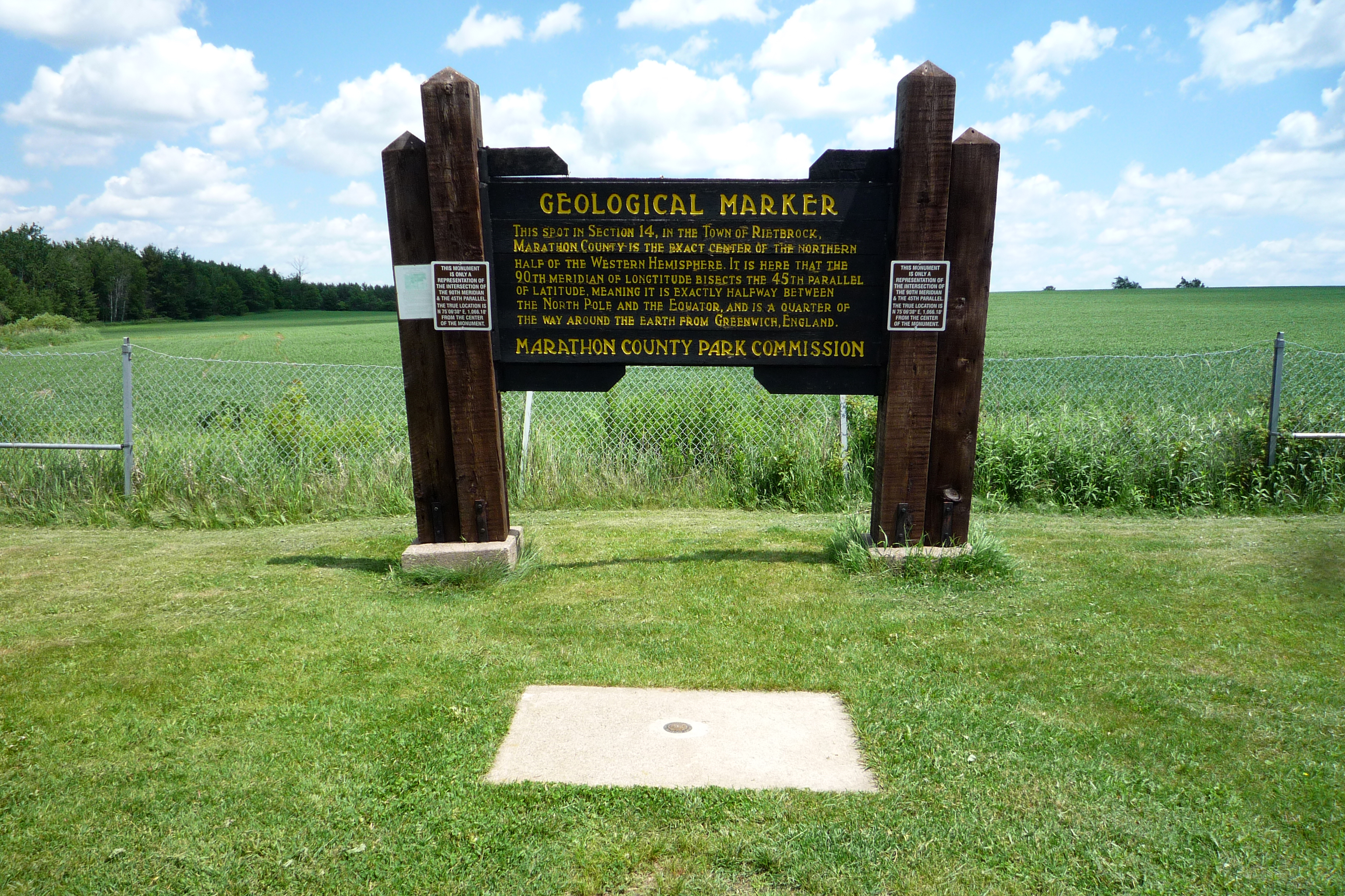
Marker located at the 45x90 point

The Marathon County Park Commission has posted a geographical marker that identifies the spot (45°N, 90°W) of the exact center of the northern half of the Western Hemisphere, meaning that it is a quarter of the way around the world from the Prime Meridian and halfway from the equator to the North Pole.

== Demographics ==
At the 2000 census there were 927 people, 289 households, and 243 families living in the town. The population density was 27.4 people per square mile (10.6/km^{2}). There were 300 housing units at an average density of 8.9 per square mile (3.4/km^{2}). The racial makeup of the town was 99.24% White, 0.11% African American, 0.32% Asian, and 0.32% from two or more races. Hispanic or Latino of any race were 0.43%.

Of the 289 households 43.9% had children under the age of 18 living with them, 75.1% were married couples living together, 2.4% had a female householder with no husband present, and 15.6% were non-families. 12.8% of households were one person and 5.2% were one person aged 65 or older. The average household size was 3.21 and the average family size was 3.50.

The age distribution was 32.0% under the age of 18, 7.8% from 18 to 24, 29.6% from 25 to 44, 20.4% from 45 to 64, and 10.2% 65 or older. The median age was 33 years. For every 100 females, there were 110.7 males. For every 100 females age 18 and over, there were 115.8 males.

The median household income was $46,389 and the median family income was $48,393. Males had a median income of $31,250 versus $21,196 for females. The per capita income for the town was $16,181. About 5.2% of families and 6.6% of the population were below the poverty line, including 6.4% of those under age 18 and 5.2% of those age 65 or over.
