= 90th meridian east =

Line of longitude

90th meridian east (interactive map)

The meridian 90° east of Greenwich is a line of longitude that extends from the North Pole across the Arctic Ocean, Asia, the Indian Ocean, the Southern Ocean, and Antarctica to the South Pole.

It is the border between two tropical cyclone basins: the Australian region and the Southwest Indian Ocean basin.

The Ninety East Ridge and Lake 90 Degrees East named after the meridian.

The 90th meridian east forms a great circle with the 90th meridian west.

This meridian is halfway between the Prime meridian and the 180th meridian and the center of the Eastern Hemisphere is this meridian's intersection with the Equator.

== From Pole to Pole ==
Starting at the North Pole and heading south to the South Pole, the 90th meridian east passes through:

Co-ordinates	Country, territory or sea	Notes
90°0′N 90°0′E	Arctic Ocean	Geographic North Pole
81°9′N 90°0′E	Kara Sea	Passing just west of Schmidt Island, Krasnoyarsk Krai, Russia
77°7′N 90°0′E	Russia	Krasnoyarsk Krai — Kirov Islands
77°6′N 90°0′E	Kara Sea	
75°33′N 90°0′E	Russia	Krasnoyarsk Krai; Republic of Khakassia — from 55°8′N 90°0′E; Tuva Republic — from 51°40′N 90°0′E
50°1′N 90°0′E	Mongolia	Bayan-Ölgii Province
47°53′N 90°0′E	China	Xinjiang; Qinghai — from 36°10′N 90°0′E; Tibet — from 33°42′N 90°0′E
28°19′N 90°0′E	Bhutan	
26°44′N 90°0′E	India	Assam - passing just east of Dhubri; Meghalaya — from 25°50′N 90°0′E
25°16′N 90°0′E	Bangladesh	
21°59′N 90°0′E	Indian Ocean	
60°0′S 90°0′E	Southern Ocean	
66°46′S 90°0′E	Antarctica	Kaiser Wilhelm II Land, Australian Antarctic Territory, claimed by Australia
90°0′S 90°0′E	Antarctica	Geographic South Pole

== See also ==
- 90th meridian west
- 45×90 points

Next westward: 89th meridian east	90th meridian east forms a great circle with 90th meridian west	Next eastward: 91st meridian east
