= Gallery of city flags in North America =

This page lists the city flags in North America. It is a part of the Lists of city flags, which is split into continents due to its size.

== The Bahamas ==
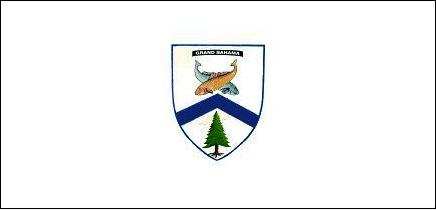
Freeport

== Belize ==
Belize City

Belmopan

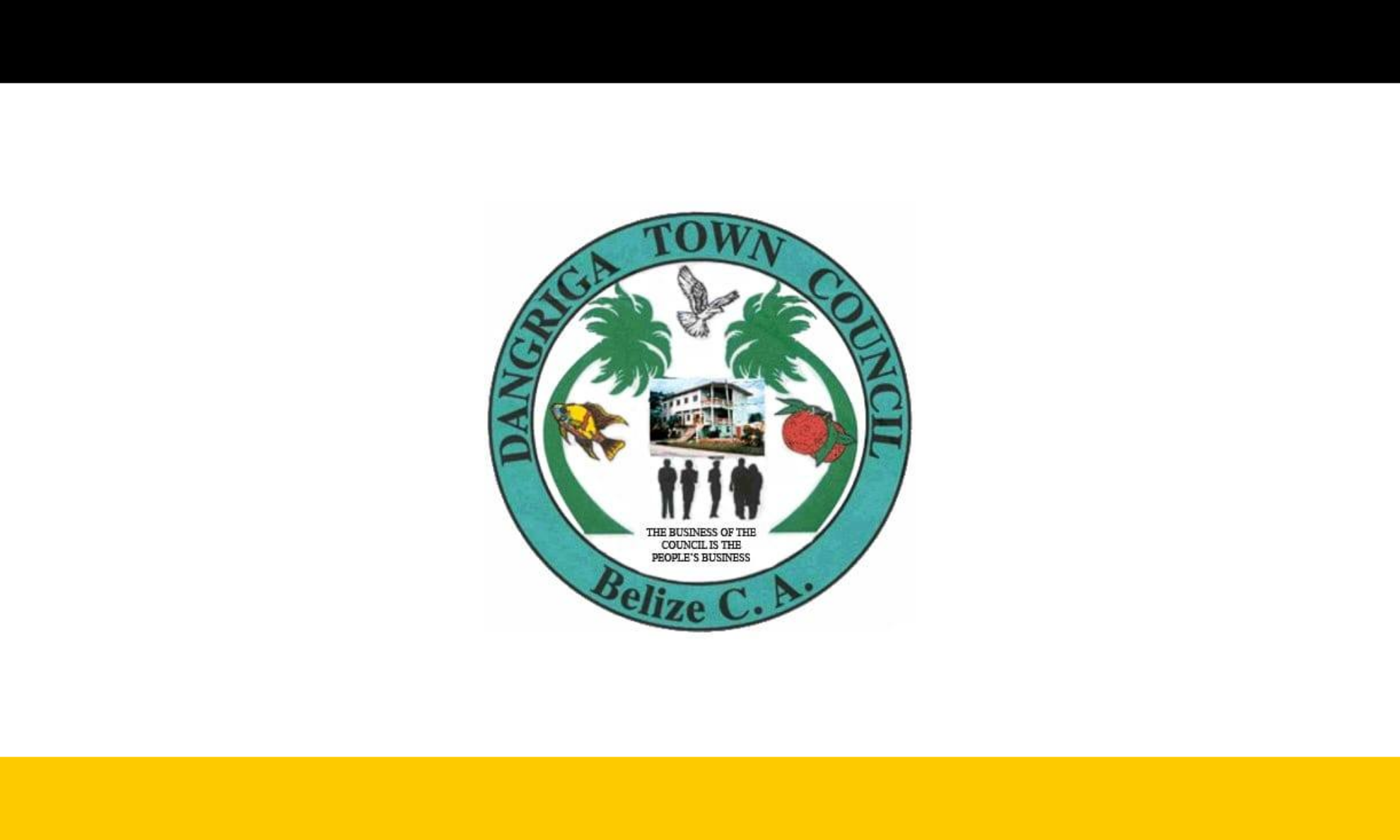
Dangriga

San Ignacio

Sarteneja

== Bermuda ==
Hamilton

St. George's

== Bonaire ==
Rincon

== Canada ==
Abbotsford

Airdrie

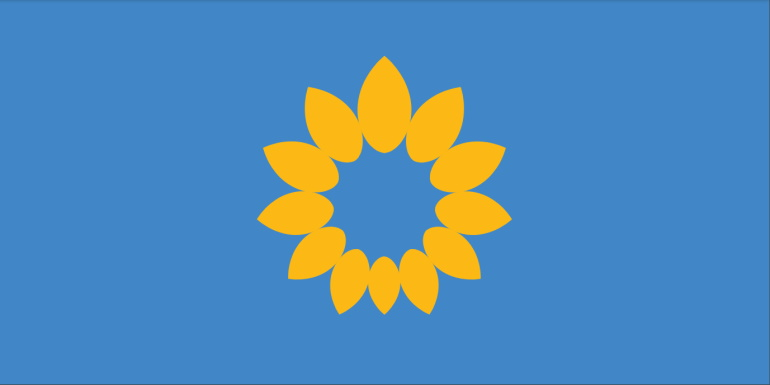
Altona

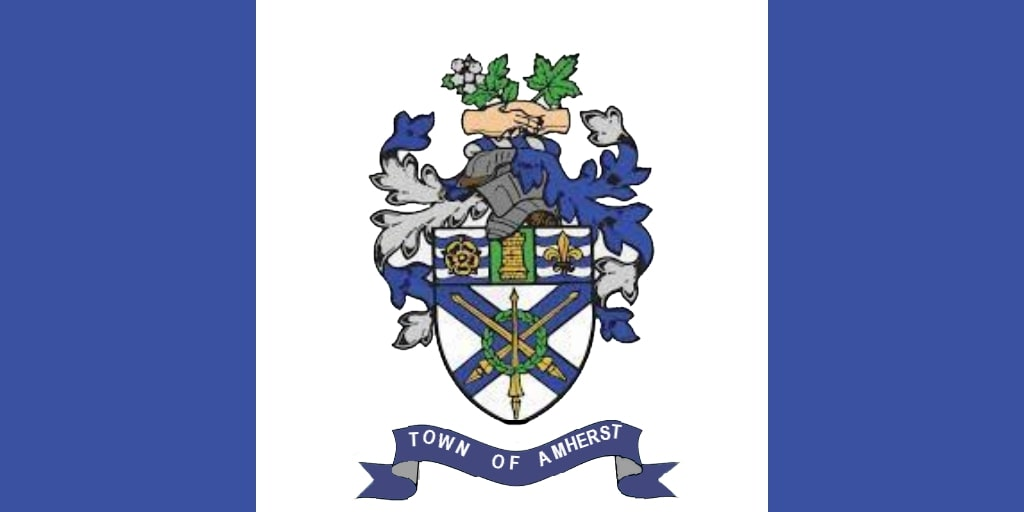
Amherst

Annapolis Royal

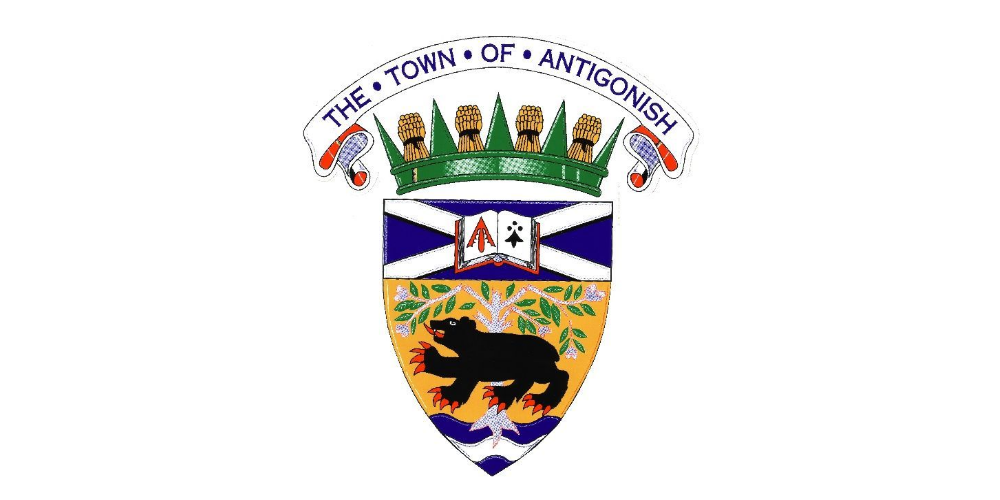
Antigonish

Arviat

Barrie

Beaumont

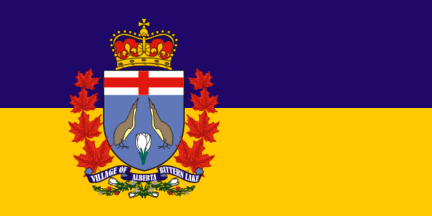
Bittern Lake

Bonnyville

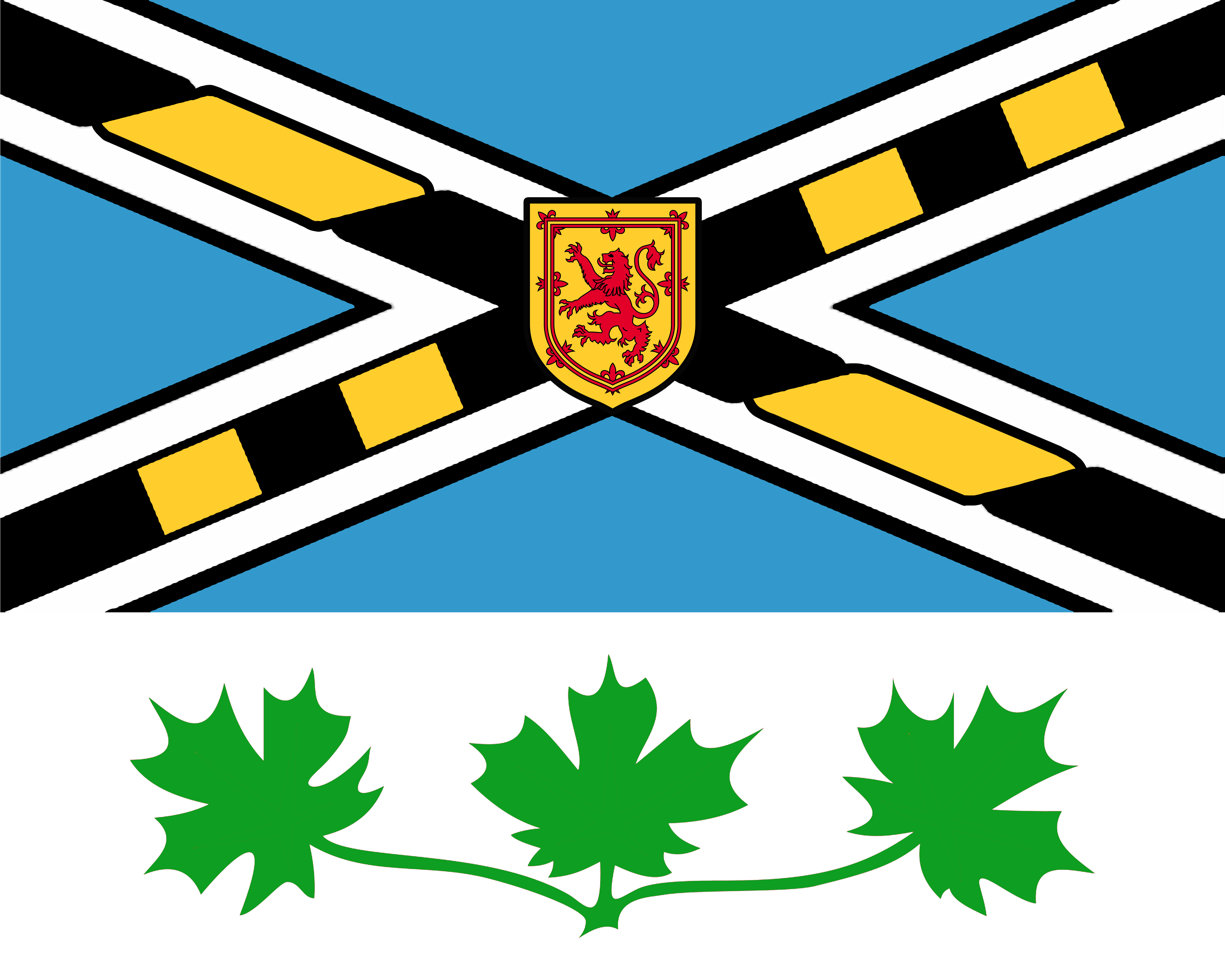
Borden-Carleton

Brampton

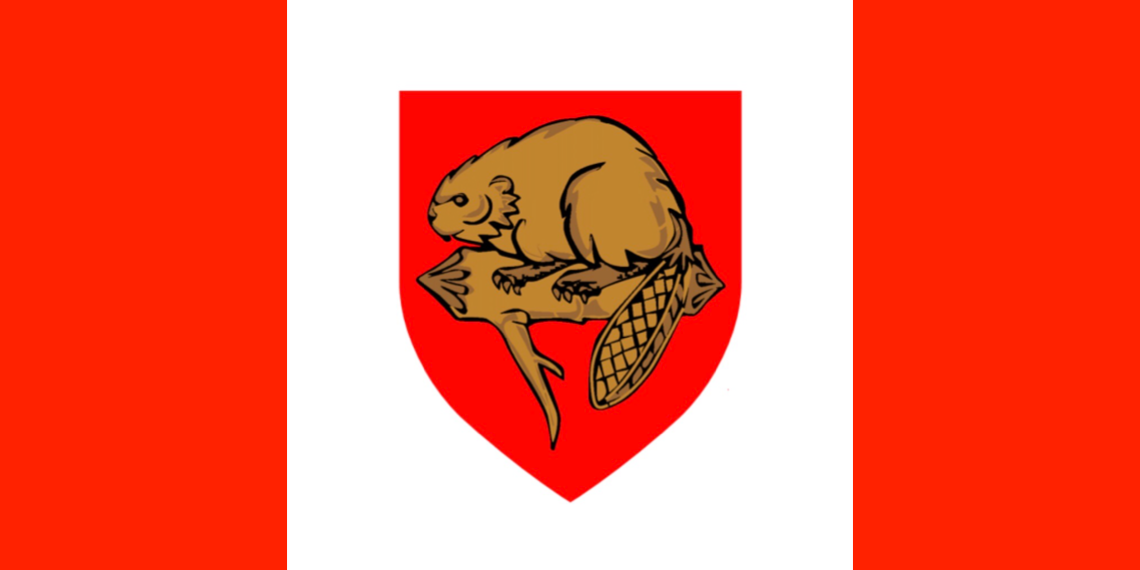
Brantford

Brossard

Burgeo

Burnaby

Caledon

Calgary

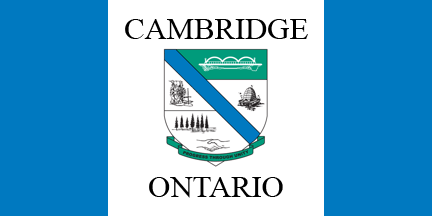
Cambridge

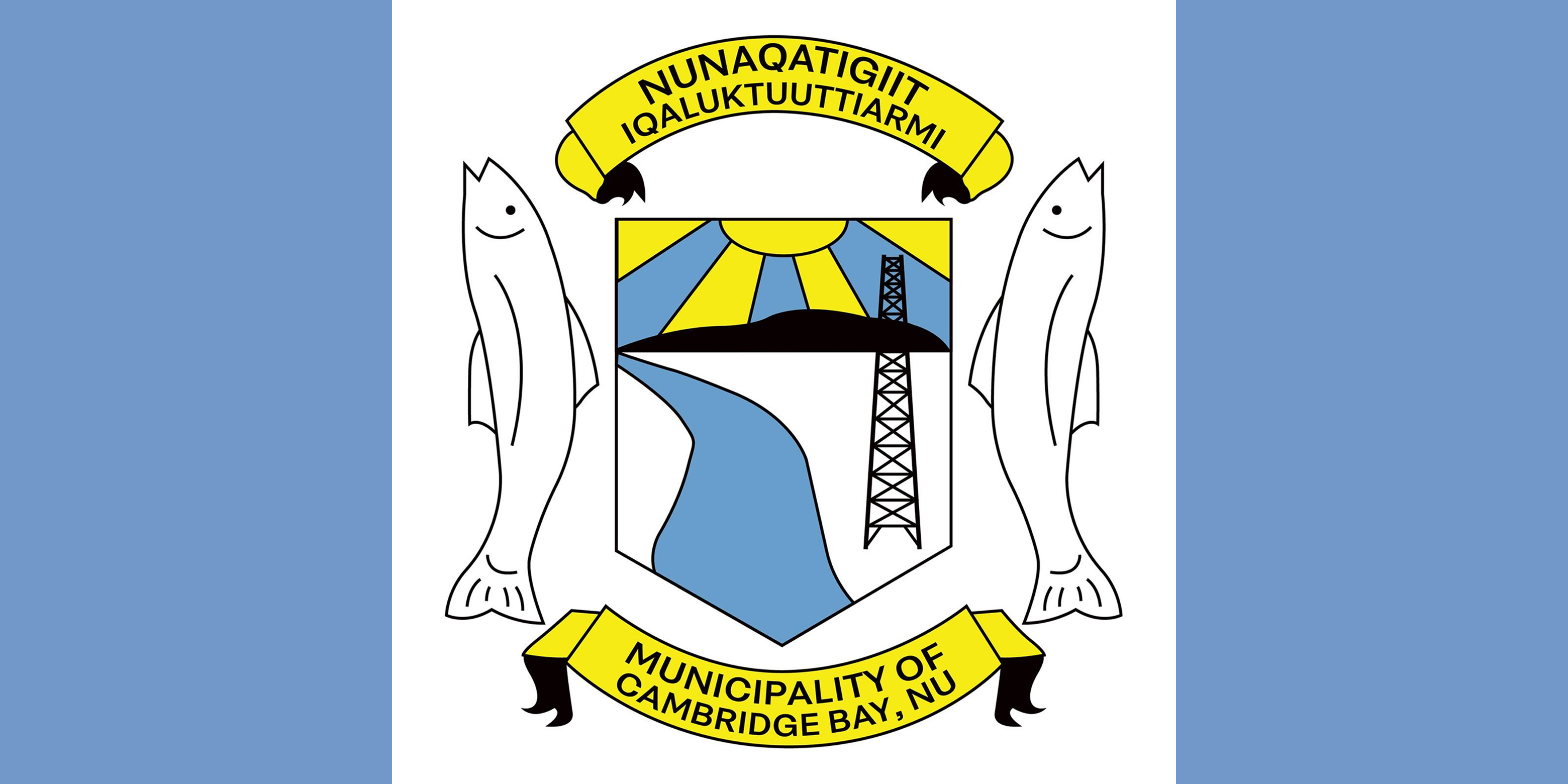
Cambridge Bay

Camrose

Canmore

Cape Breton

Charlottetown (details)

Chibougamau

Chilliwack

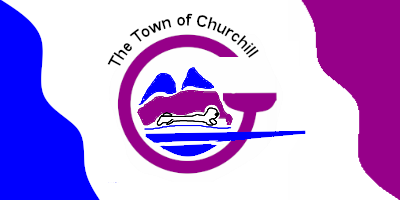
Churchill

Coquitlam

Cornwall

Cupids

Dawson Creek

Delta

Edmonton (details)

Edmundston

Essex

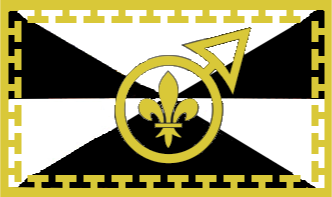
Fermont

Fernie

Fort Saskatchewan

Fortune

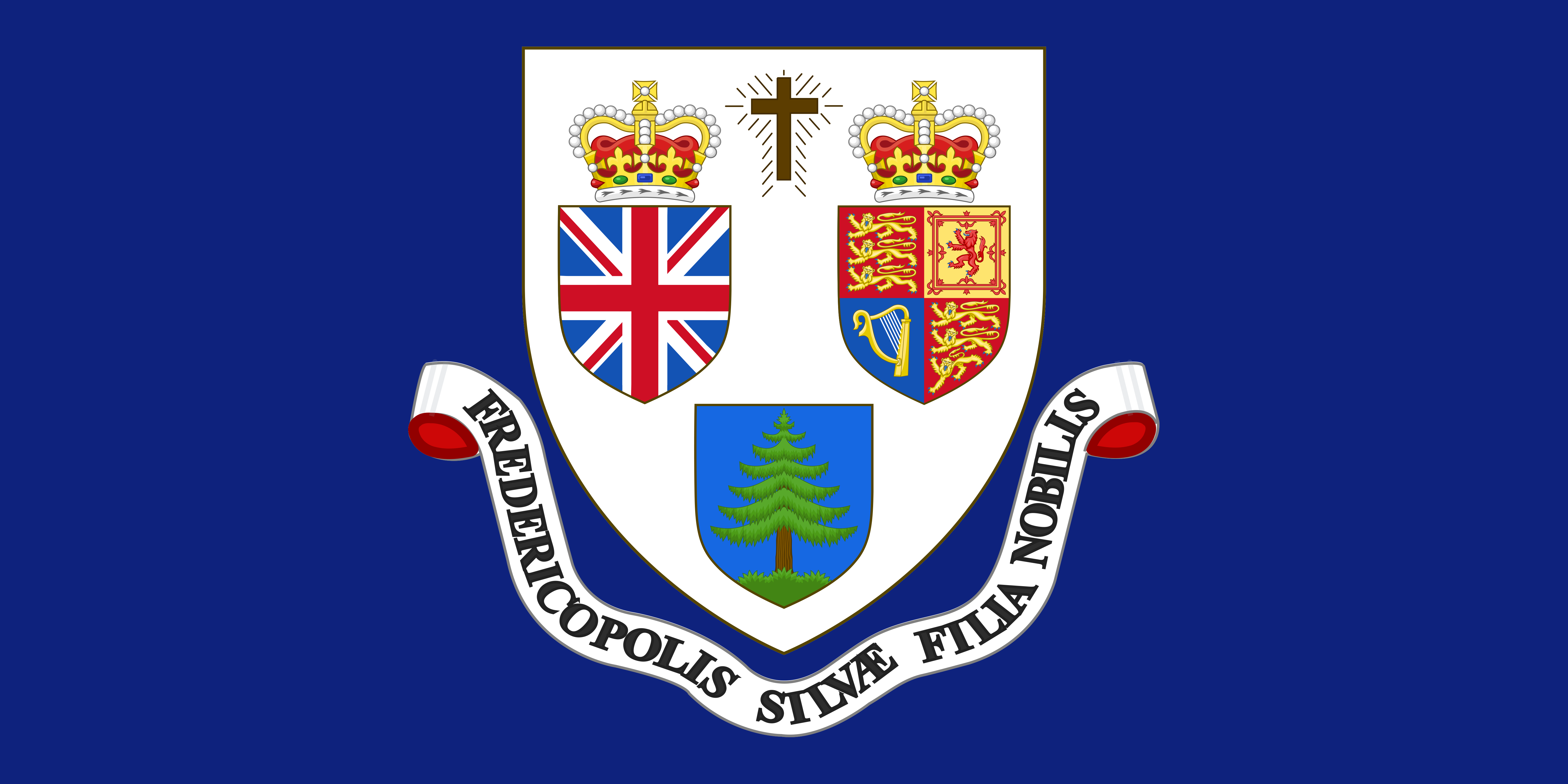
Fredericton

Gananoque

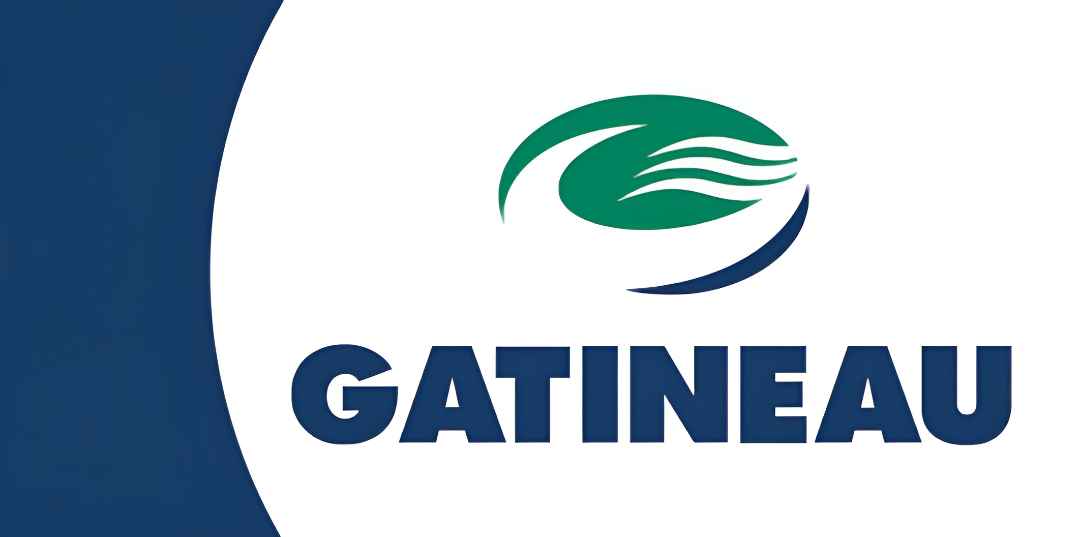
Gatineau

Gibsons

Greater Sudbury (details)

Guelph

Halifax

Hamilton (details)

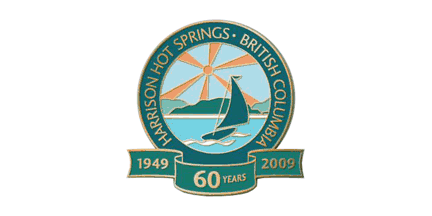
Harrison Hot Springs

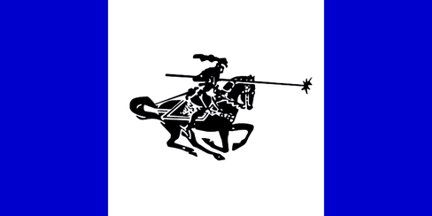
Hussar

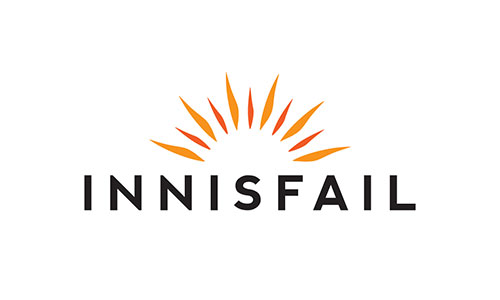
Innisfail

Iqaluit

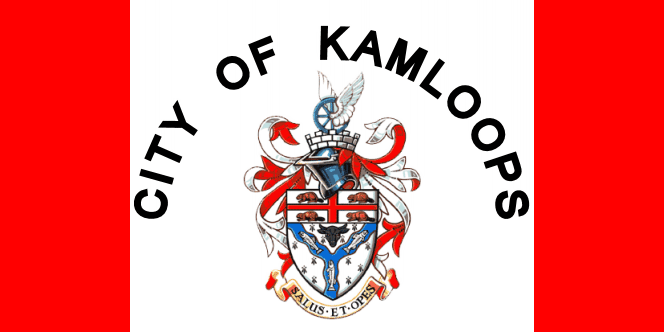
Kamloops

Kelowna

Kimberley

Kindersley

Kingston

Kingsville

Kitchener

Lacombe

Lakeshore

Langley

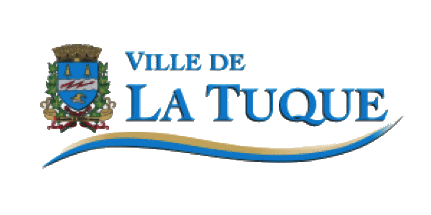
La Tuque

Laval

Leduc

Lethbridge (details)

Lévis

Lions Bay

Lloydminster

London

Longueuil

Maple Ridge

Markham

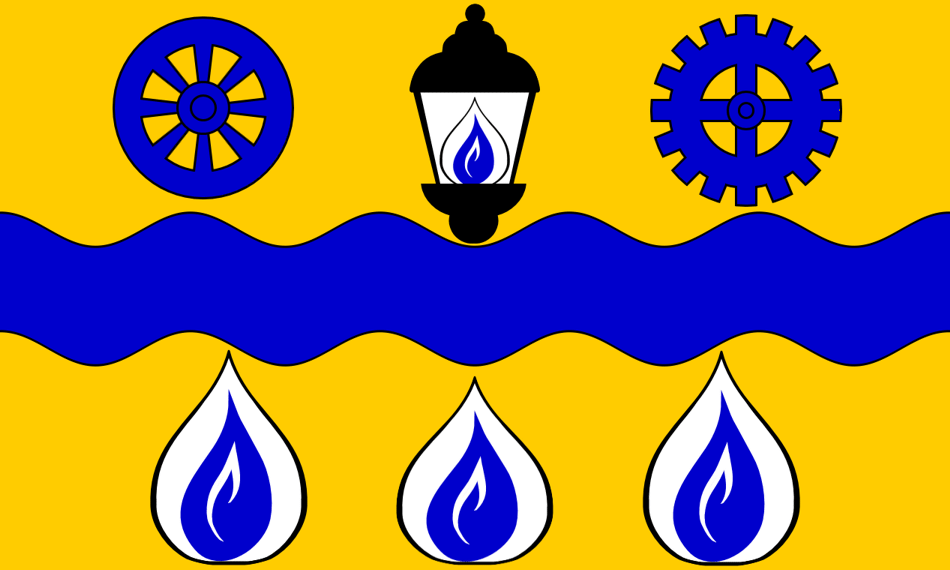
Medicine Hat (details)

Midway

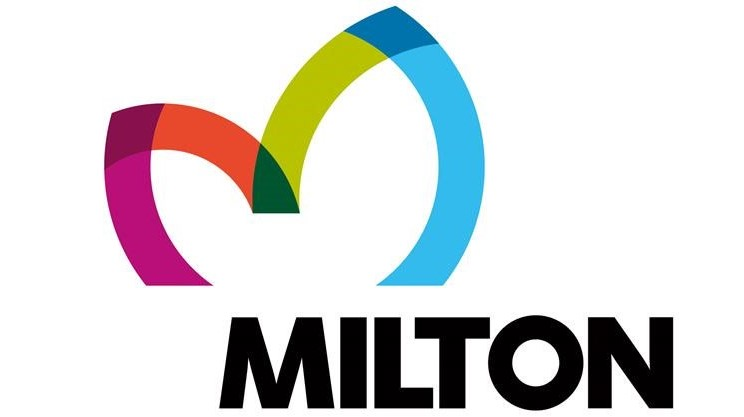
Milton

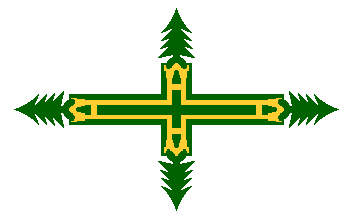
Mission

Mississauga

Moncton

Montreal (details)

Morris

Nanaimo

New Minas

New Westminster

Norfolk County

North Bay

North Vancouver

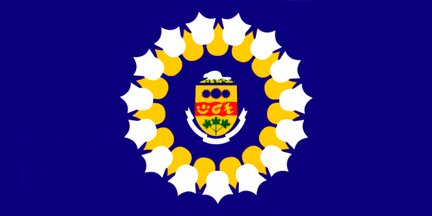
Oshawa

Ottawa (details)

Paradise

Parksville

Peterborough

Pickering

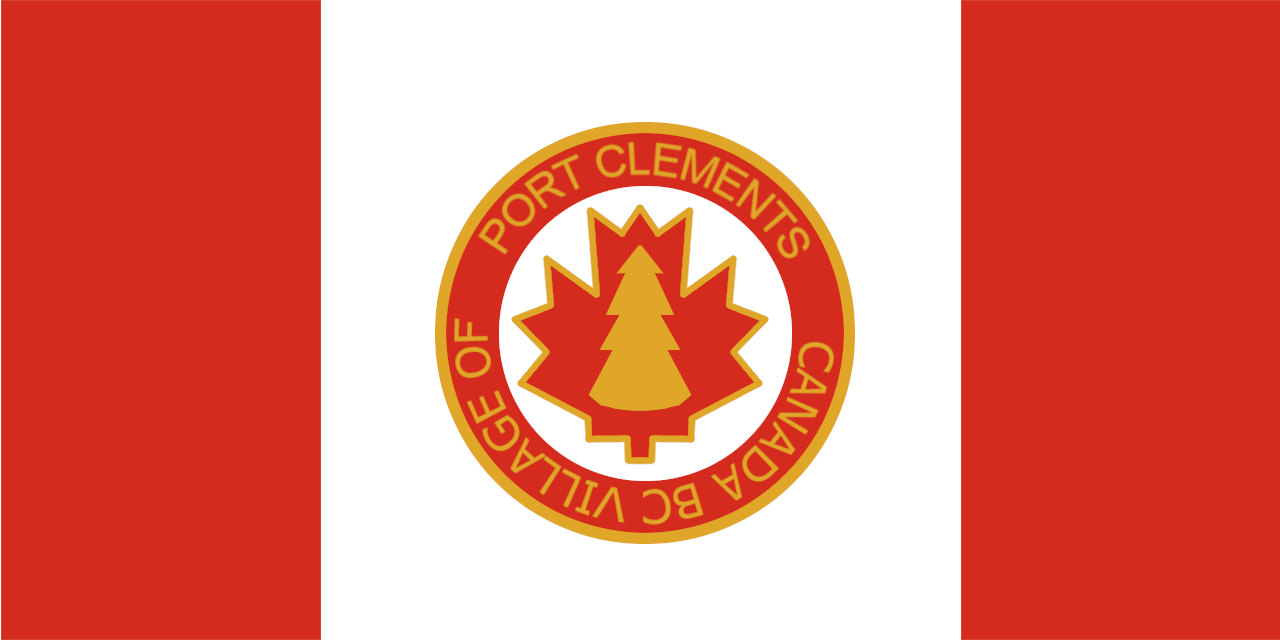
Port Clements

Port Coquitlam

Prince Albert

Prince George

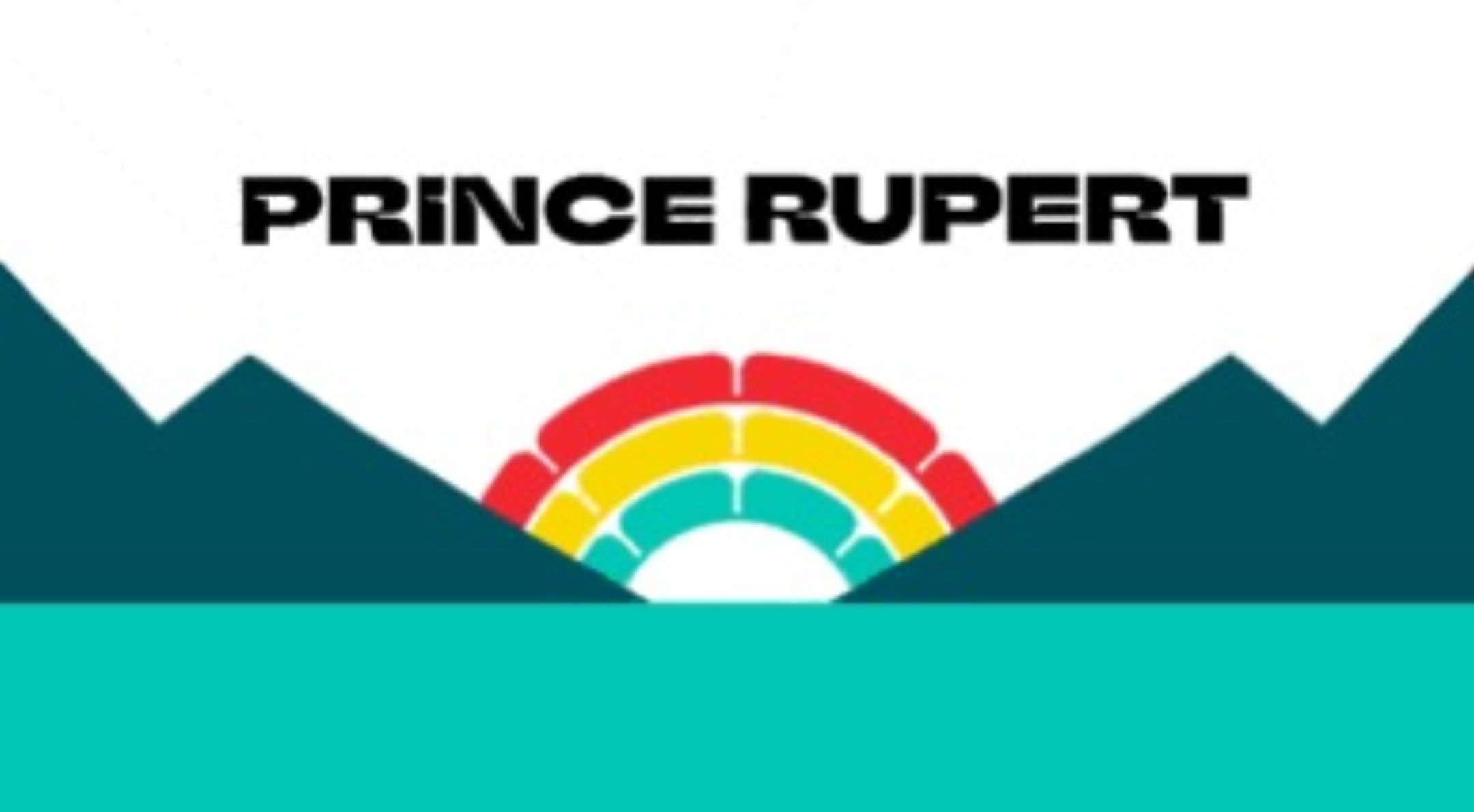
Prince Rupert

Quebec City (details)

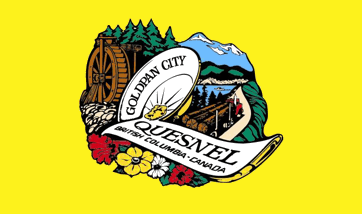
Quesnel

Red Deer

Regina

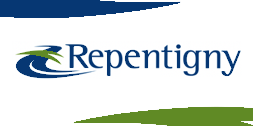
Repentigny

Richmond

Richmond Hill

Rimouski

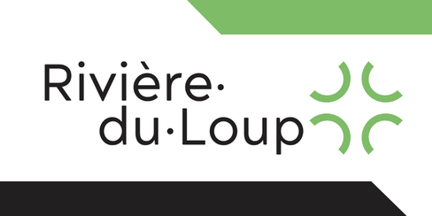
Rivière-du-Loup

Saguenay

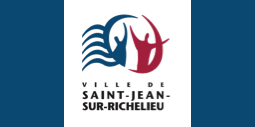
Saint-Jean-sur-Richelieu

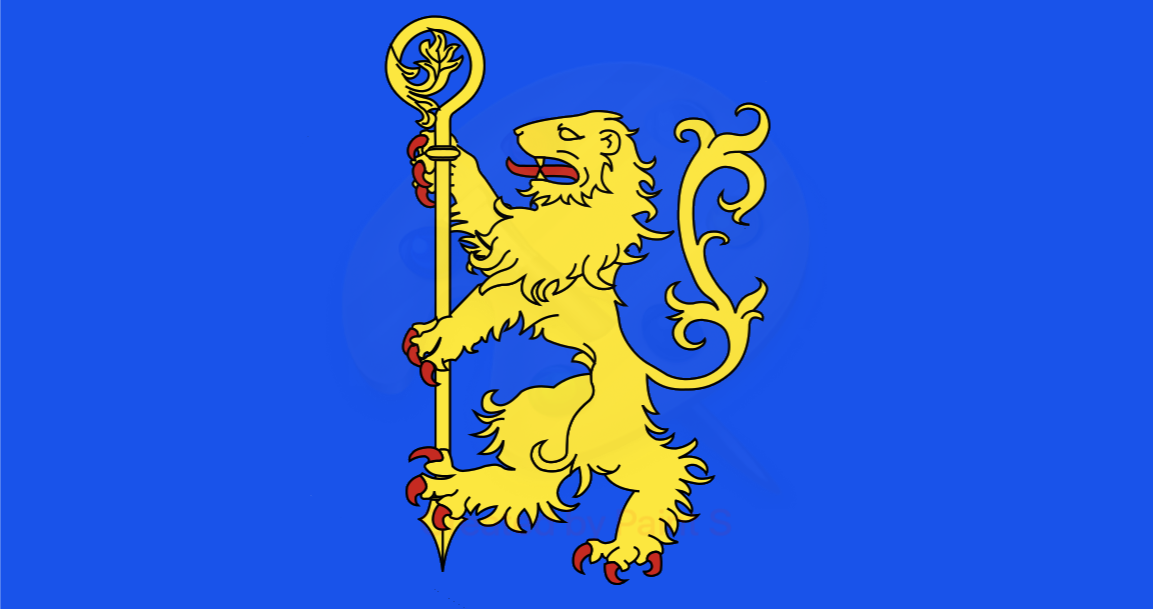
Saint-Jérôme

Saint John

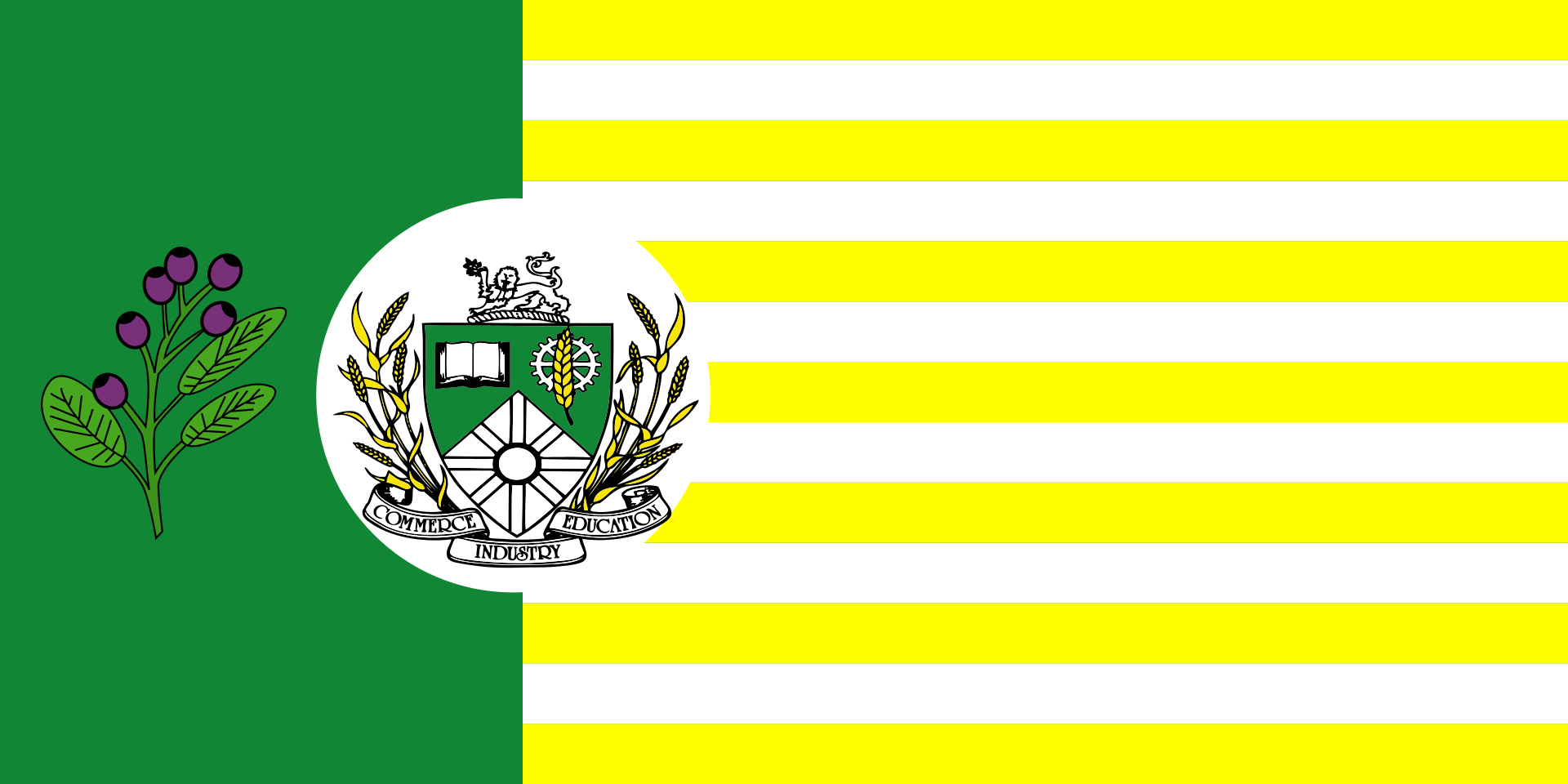
Saskatoon (details)

Sherbrooke

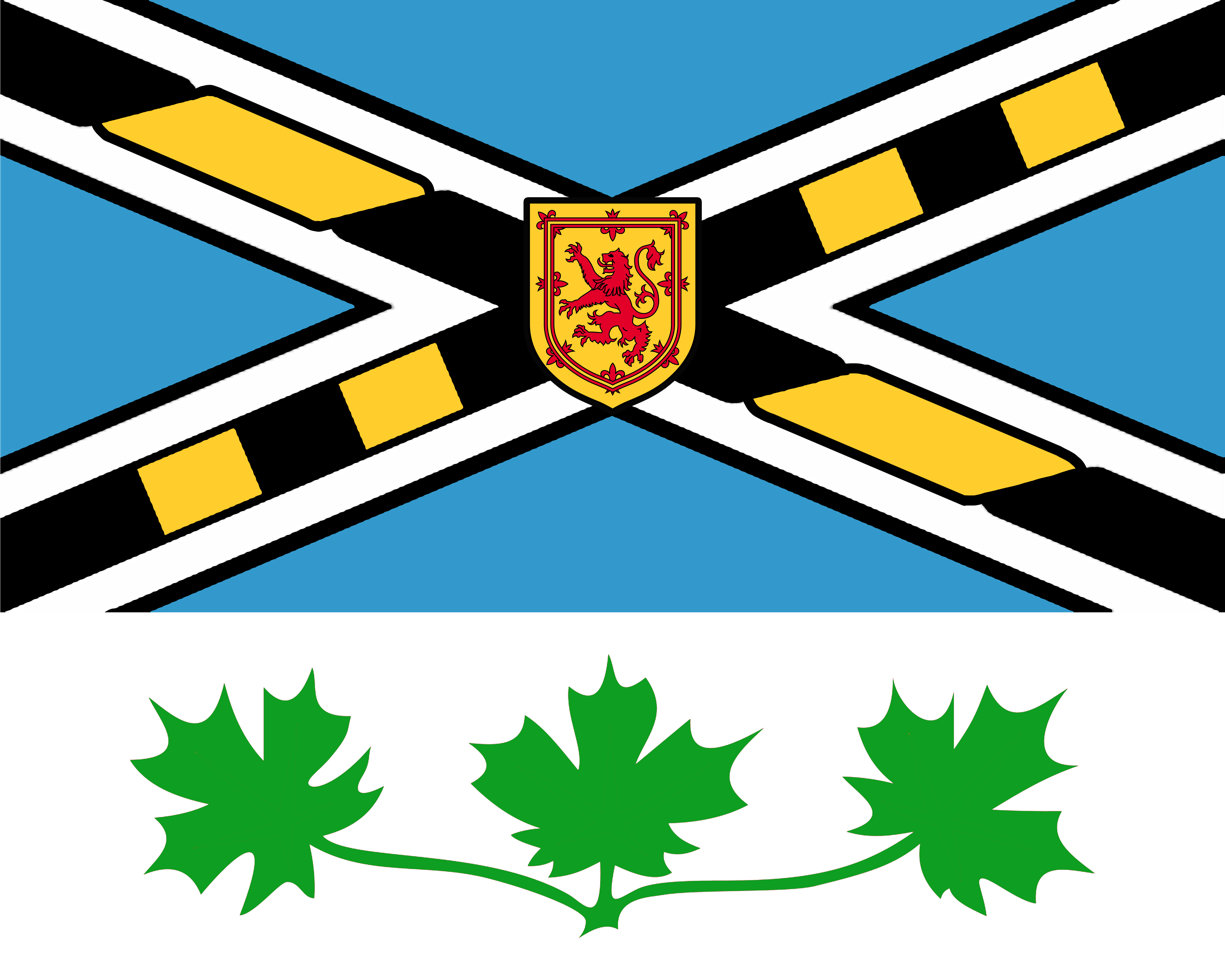
Souris

Spruce Grove

St. Albert

St. Catharines (details)

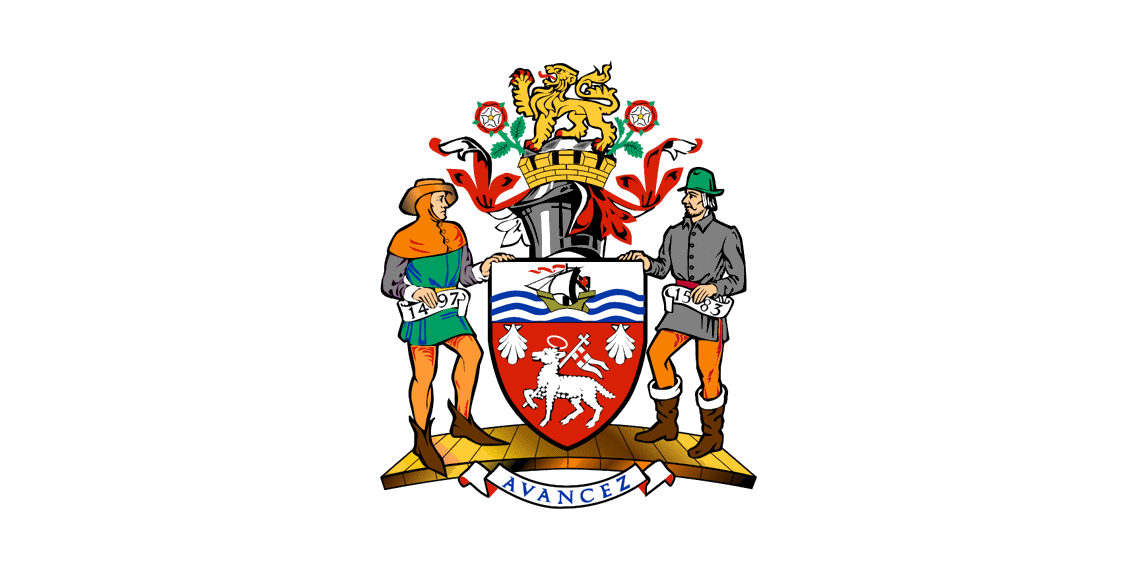
St. John's

Strathmore

St. Thomas

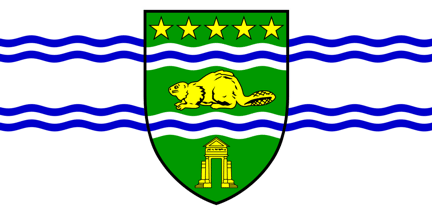
Surrey

Swan Hills

Thunder Bay (details)

Toronto (details)

Trois-Rivières

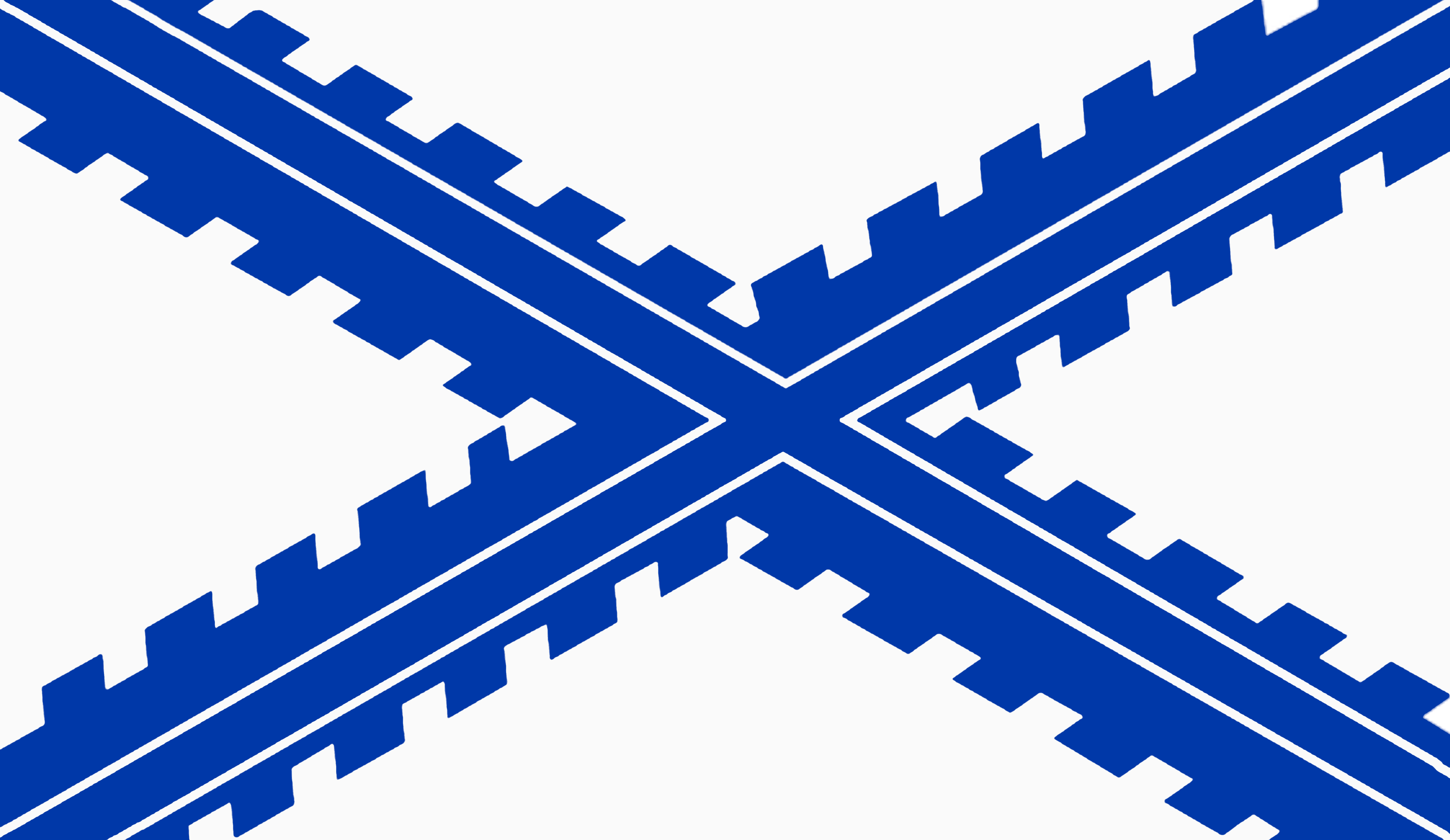
Truro

Vancouver (details)

Vaughan

Vernon (details)

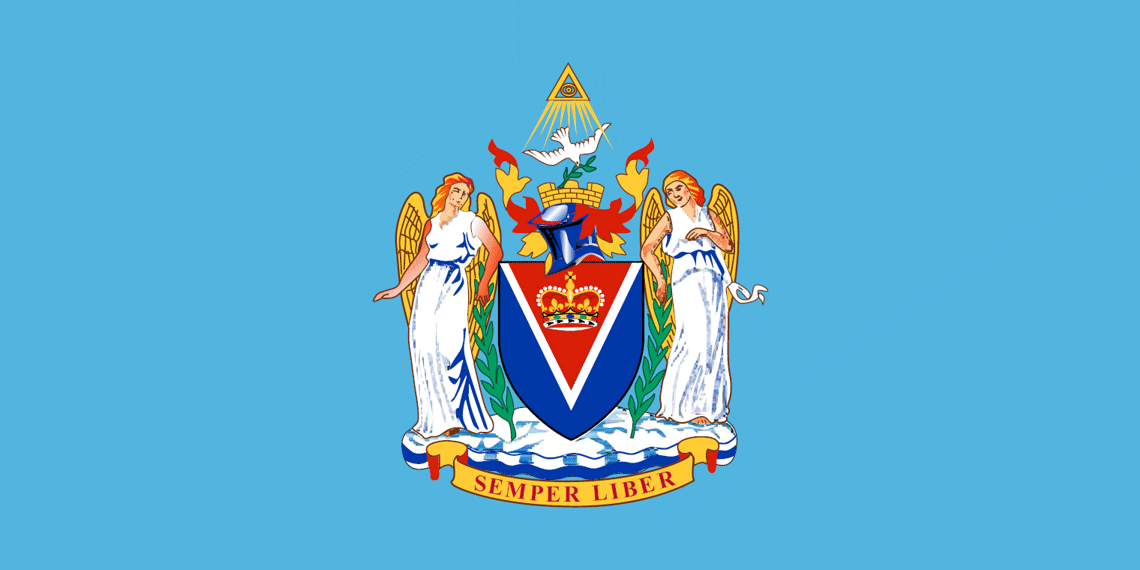
Victoria (details)

Wabush

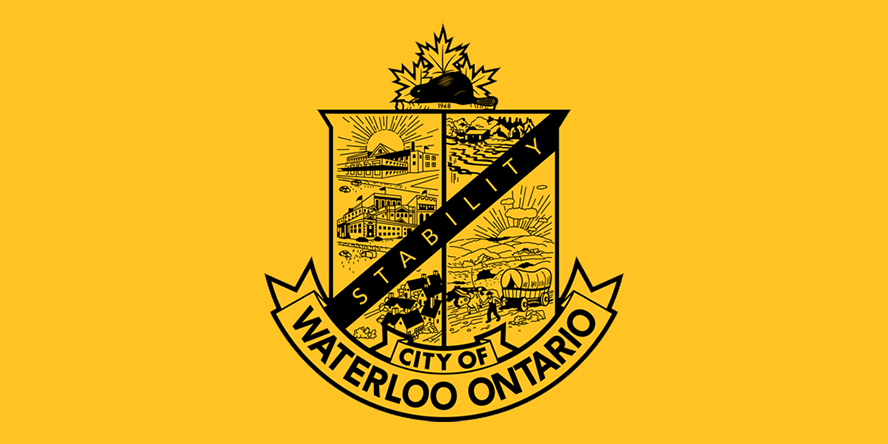
Waterloo

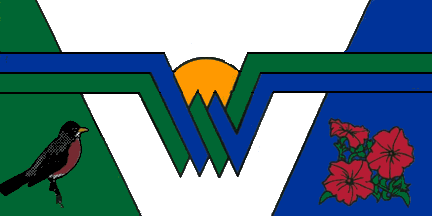
Westlock

Wetaskiwin

Whistler

Whitehorse

Windsor (details)

Winnipeg (details)

Yellowknife

Zorra

=== Historical ===
Edmonton (1966 - 1986)

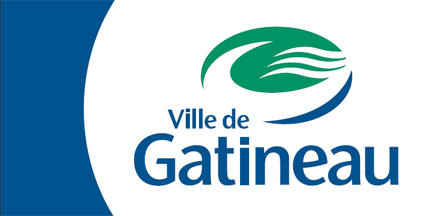
Gatineau (2002 - 2024)

Longueuil (1967 - 2004)

Montreal (1935 - 1939)

Montreal (1939 - 2017)

Ottawa (1902 - 1987)

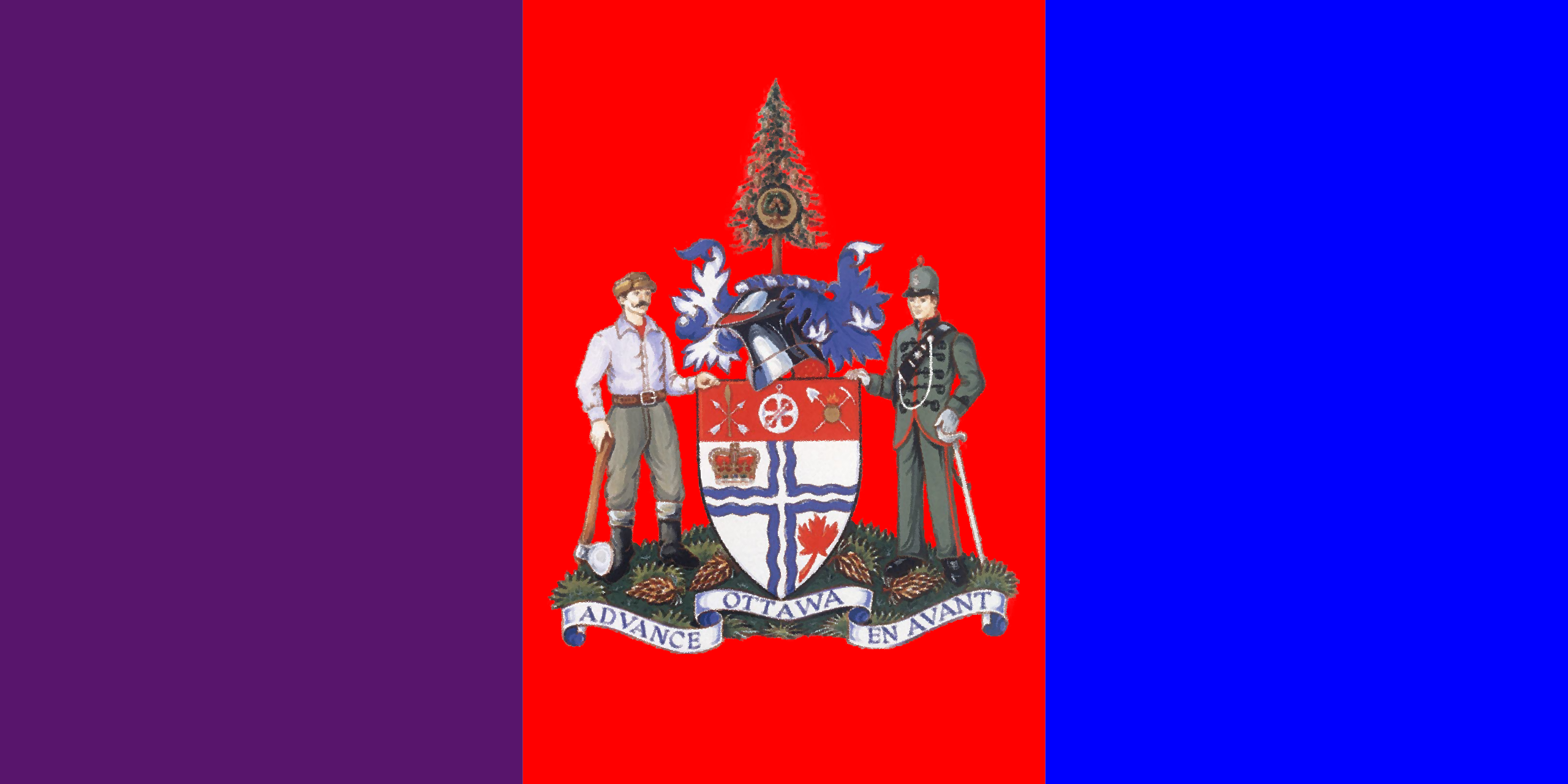
Ottawa (1987 - 2000)

Quebec City (1967 - 1987)

Shawinigan (1951 - 2009)

== Costa Rica ==
Alajuela

Aserrí

Cartago

Escazú

Esparza

Goicoechea

Guatuso

Heredia

La Unión

Liberia

Limón

Los Chiles

Pérez Zeledón

Pococí

Puntarenas

Puriscal

San Carlos

San Isidro

San José

San Pablo

Santa Bárbara

Santo Domingo

== Cuba ==
Bayamo and Yara

Caimito

Ciénaga de Zapata

Cienfuegos

Cruces

Cumanayagua

Guanabacoa

Havana

Holguín

Jagüey Grande

Quivicán

Ranchuelo

Santa Clara

Santiago de Cuba

Trinidad

=== Historical ===
Havana (until 2023)

== El Salvador ==
Aguilares

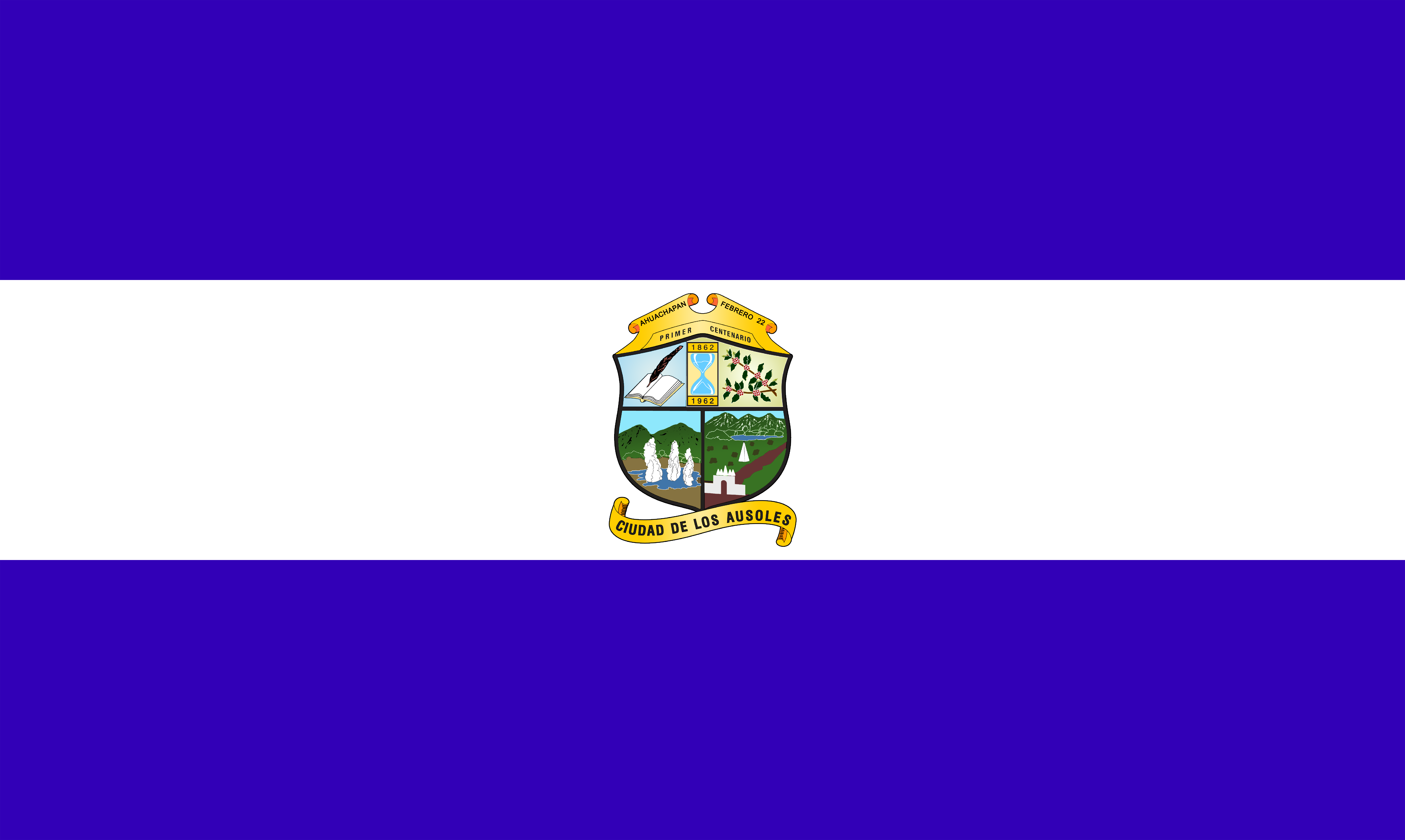
Ahuachapán

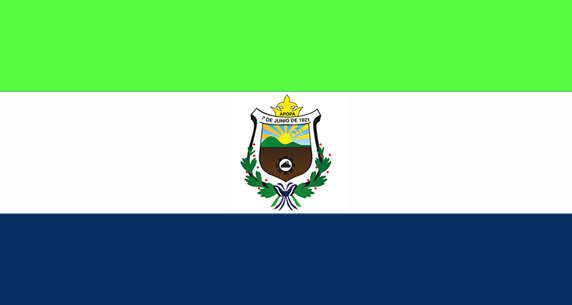
Apopa

Armenia

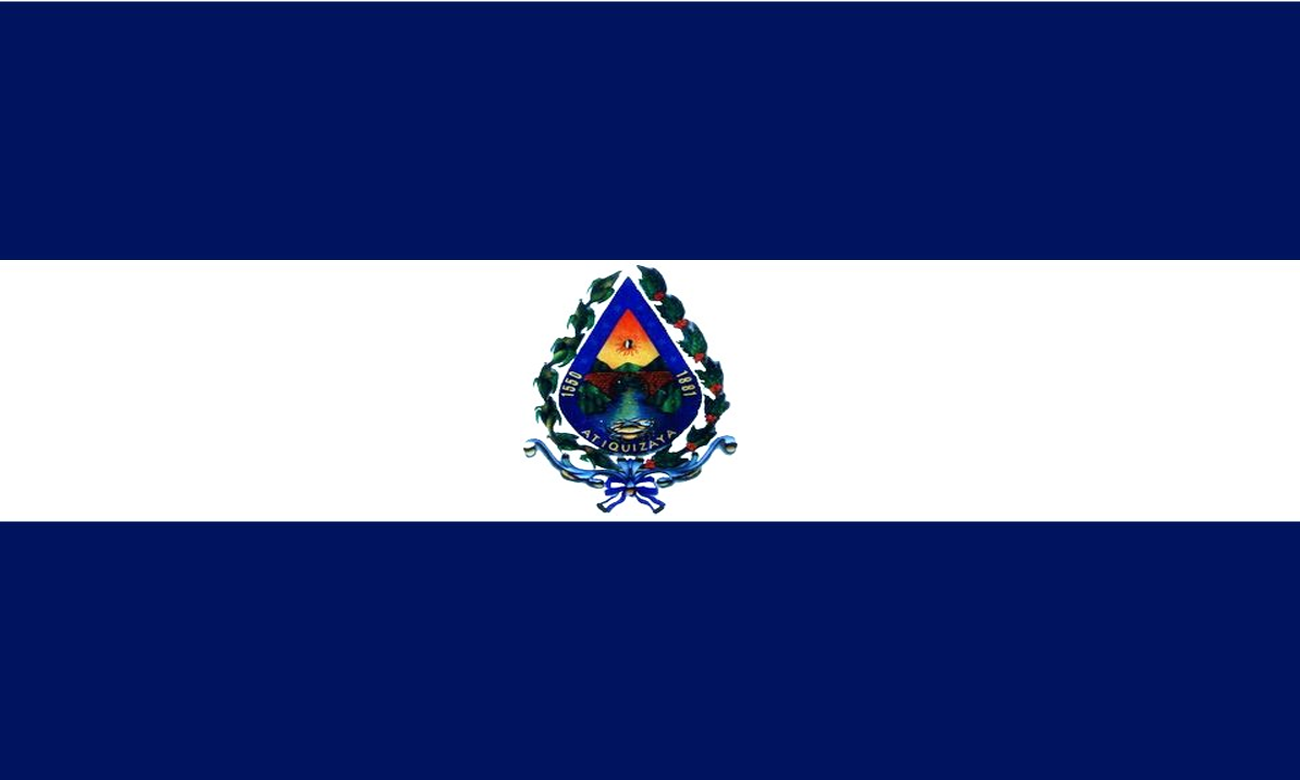
Atiquizaya

Berlín

Candelaria

Chalatenango

Chapeltique

Chilanga

Conchagua

Corinto

Dolores

El Sauce

Jiquilisco

Jocoro

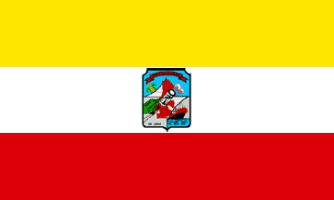
La Unión

Moncagua

Monte San Juan

Nueva Guadalupe

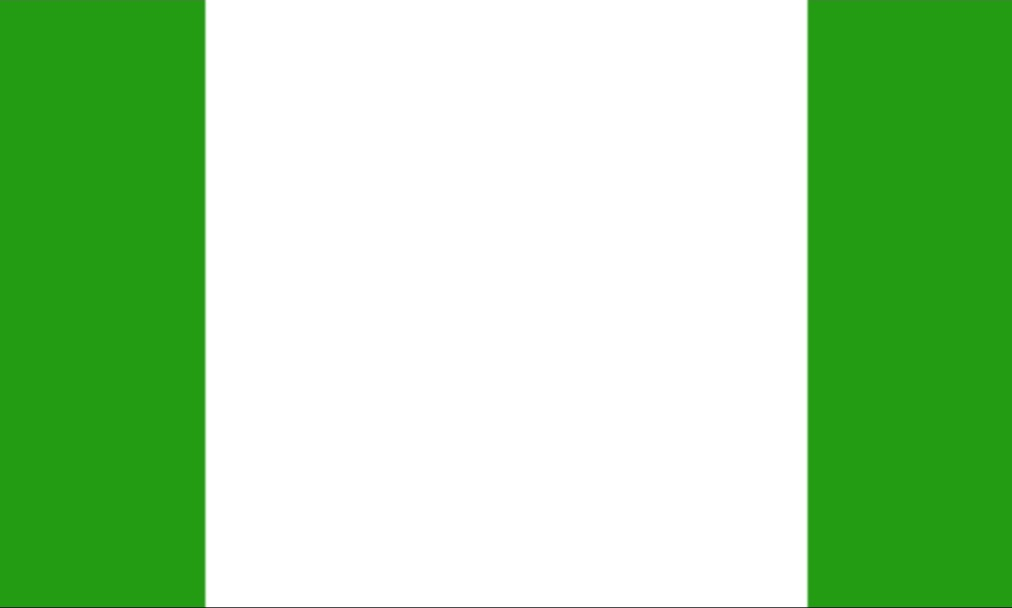
Pasaquina

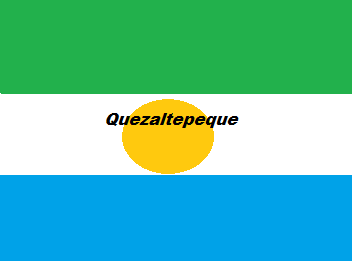
Quezaltepeque

San Alejo

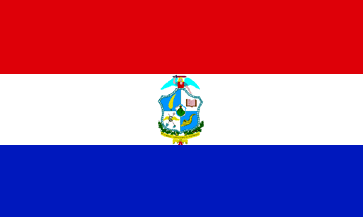
San Miguel

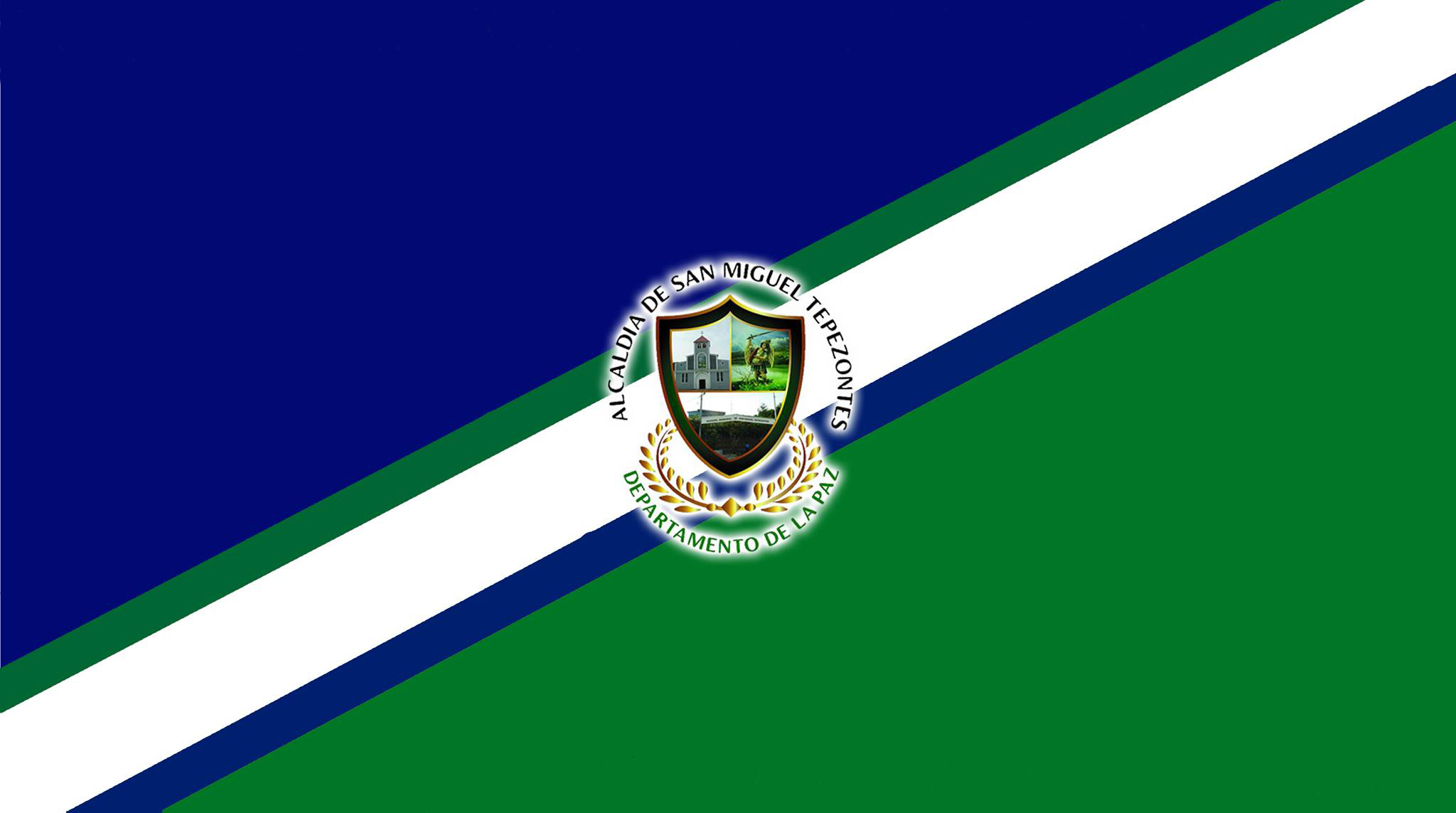
San Miguel Tepezontes

San Salvador

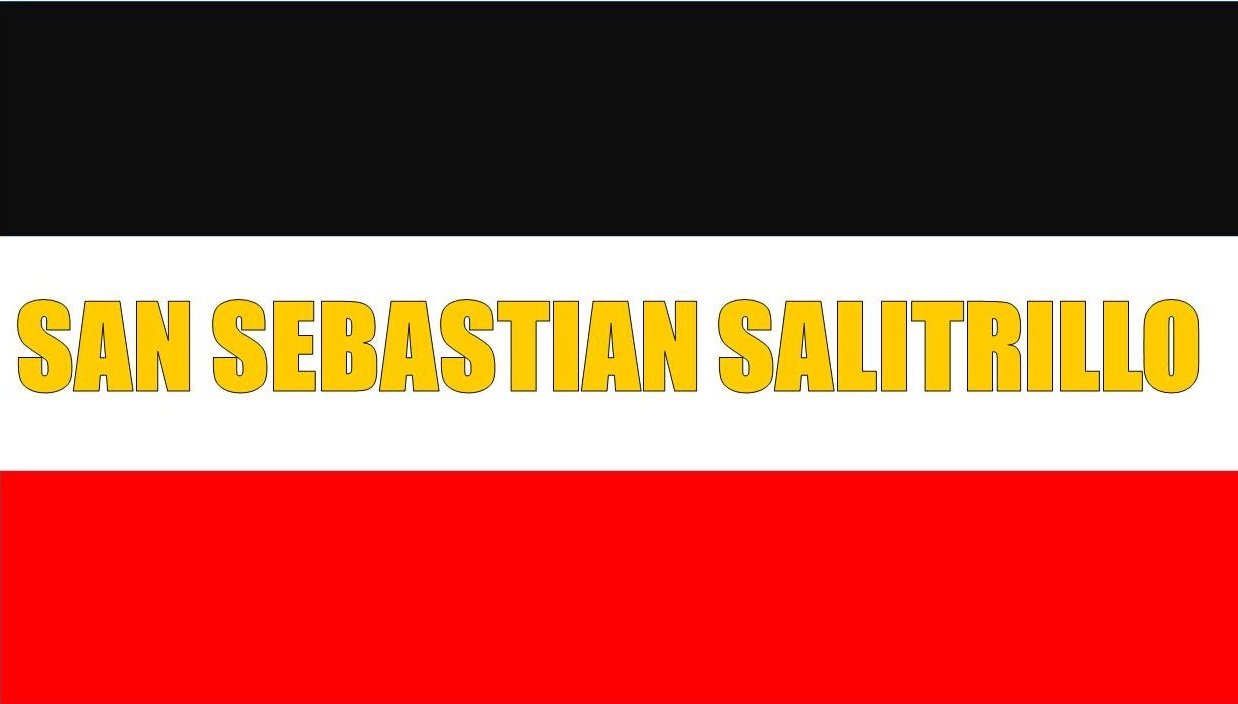
San Sebastián Salitrillo

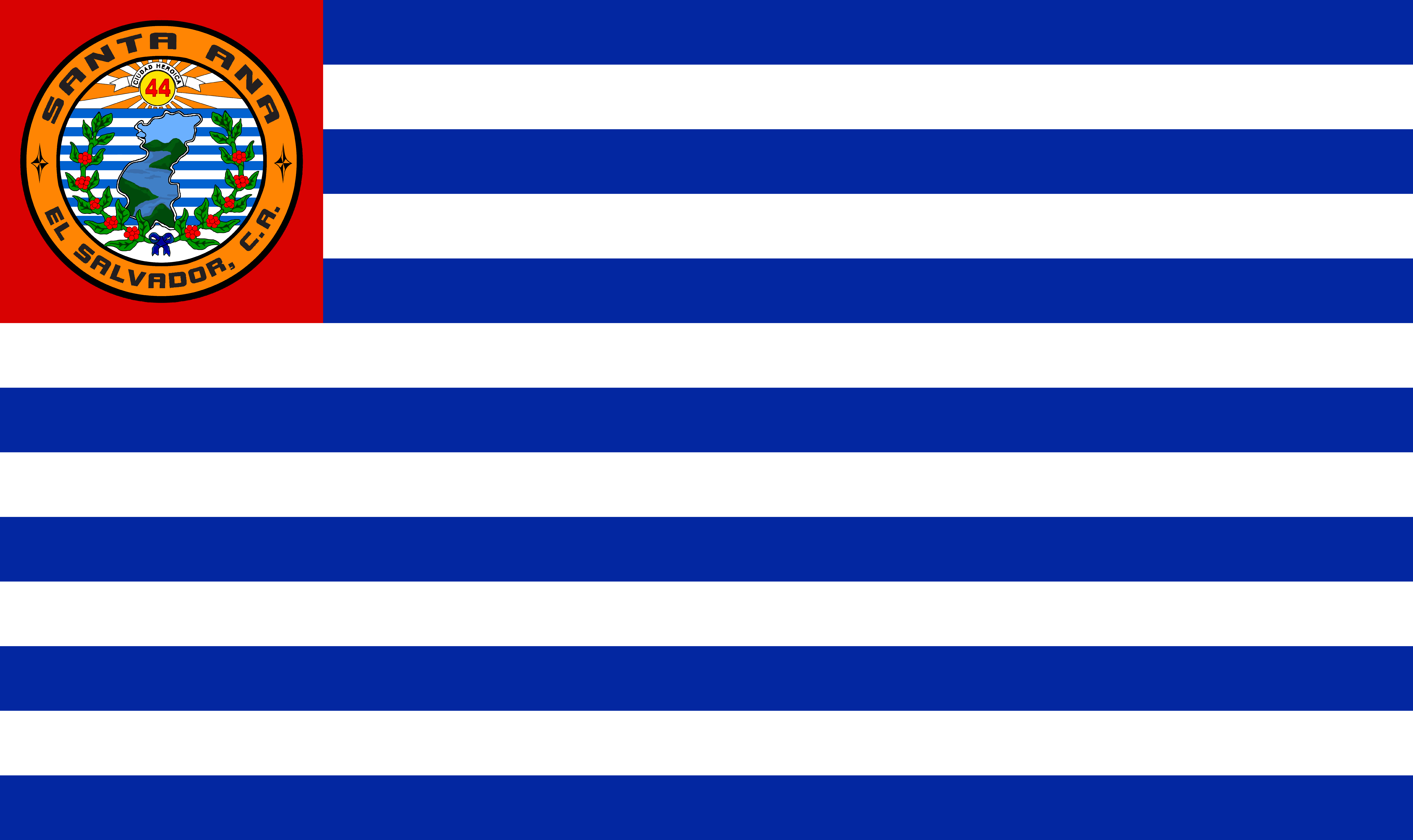
Santa Ana

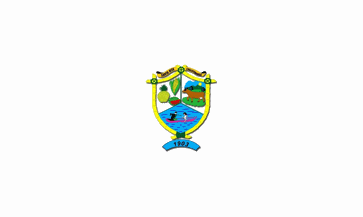
Santa Rita

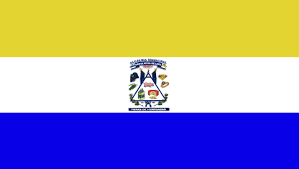
Santa Rosa de Lima

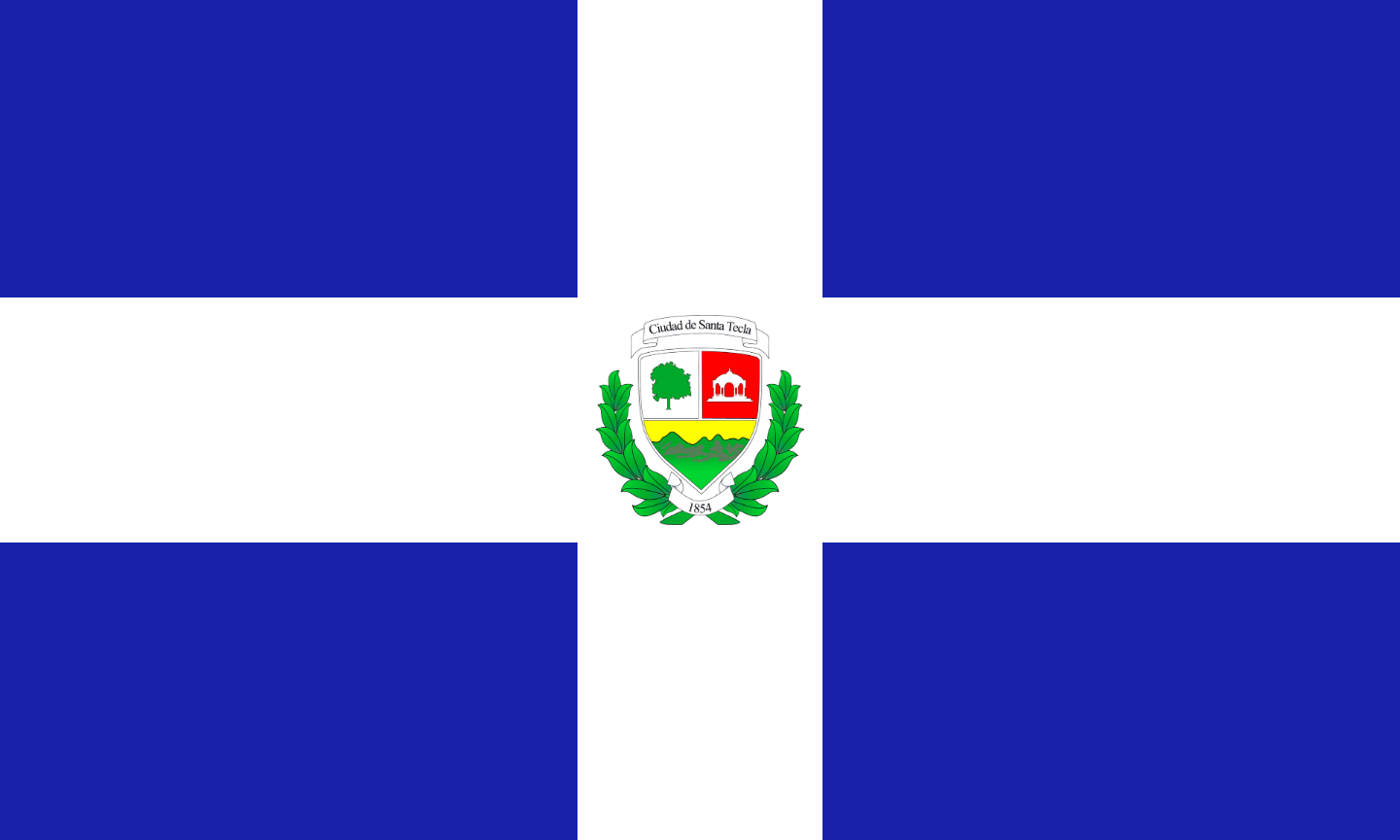
Santa Tecla

San Vicente

Sensuntepeque

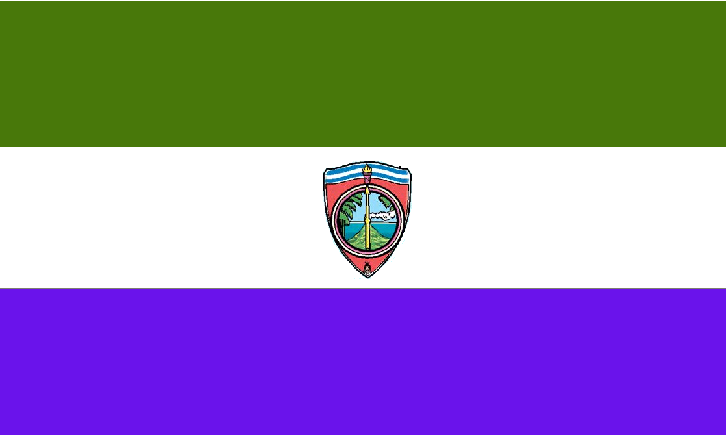
Sonsonate

Usulután

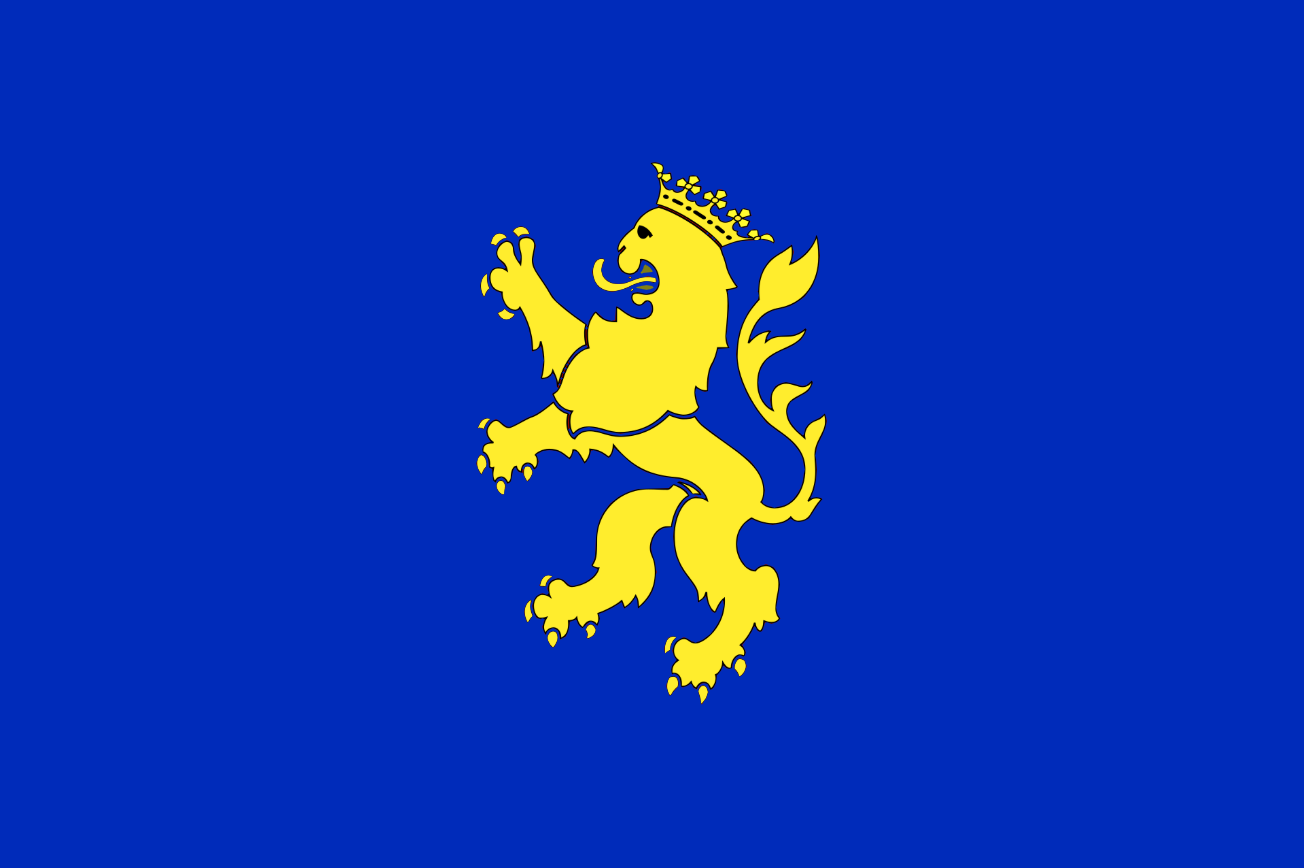
Zaragoza

=== Historical ===
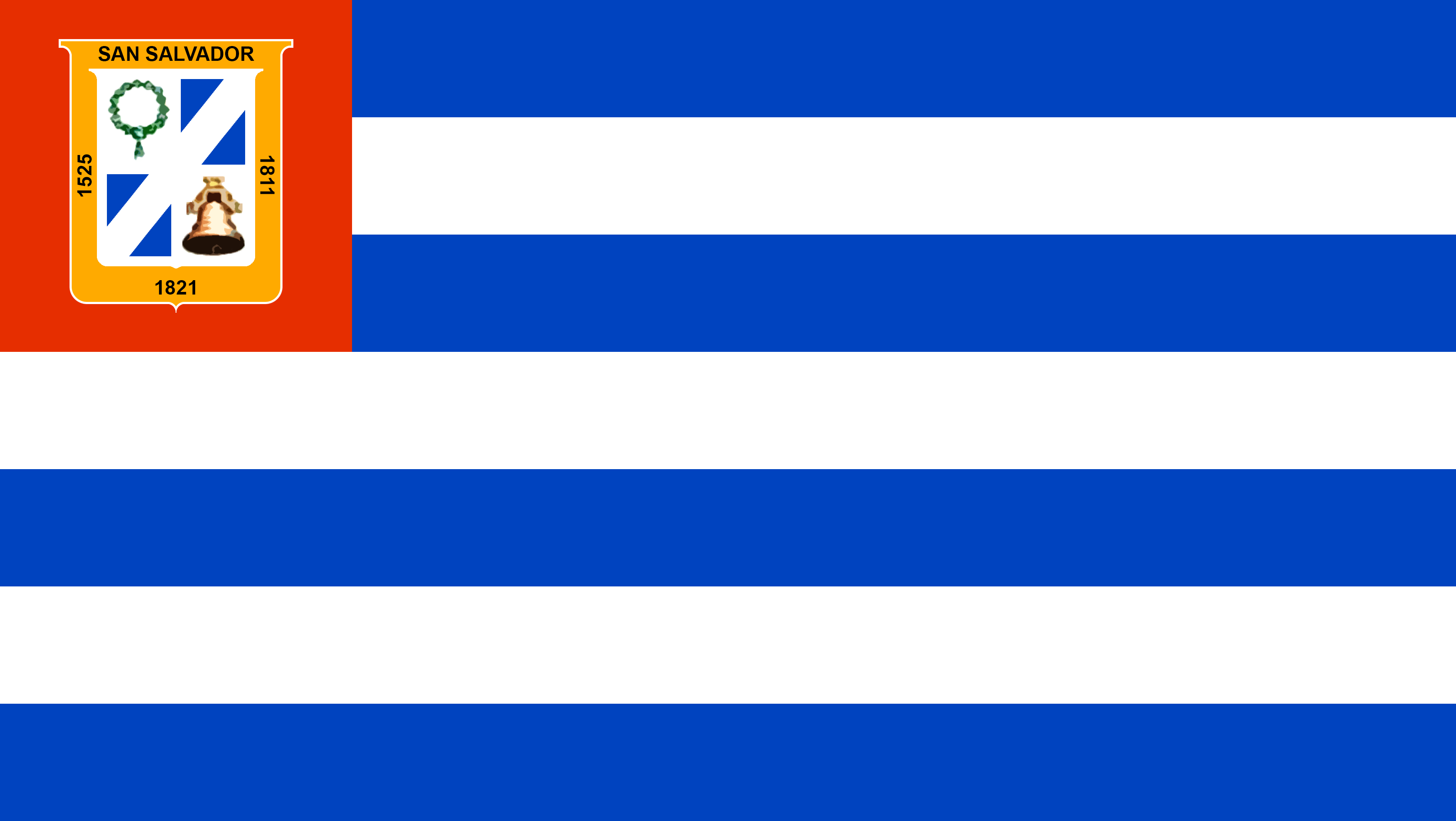
San Salvador (until 2015)

San Salvador (2015 - 2021)

== Greenland ==
Aasiaat

Ilulissat

Ittoqqortoormiit

Nuuk

Qaqortoq

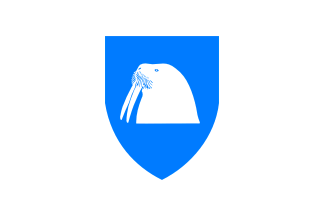
Sisimiut

== Guatemala ==
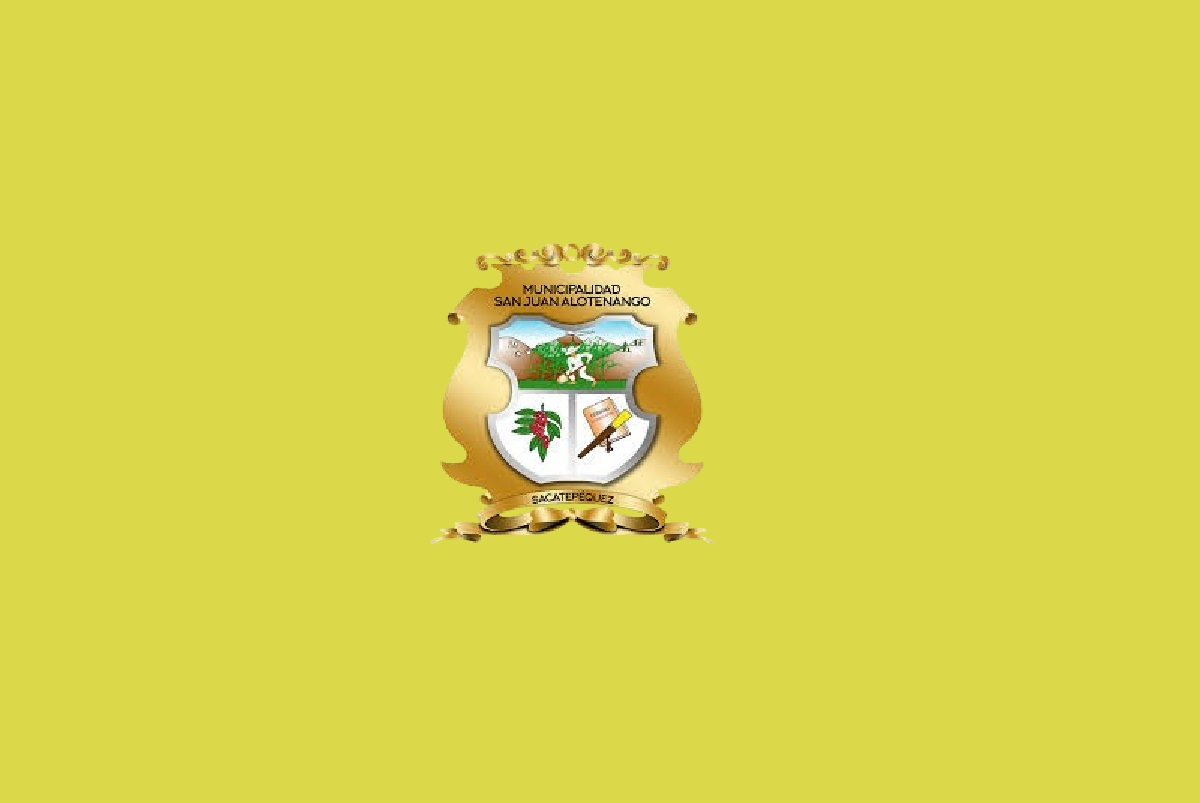
Alotenango

Amatitlán

Antigua Guatemala

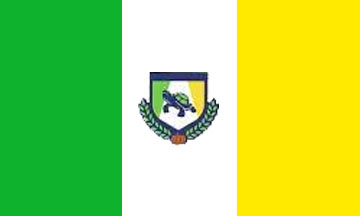
Ayutla

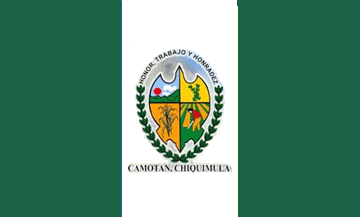
Camotán

Chinautla

Chiquimula

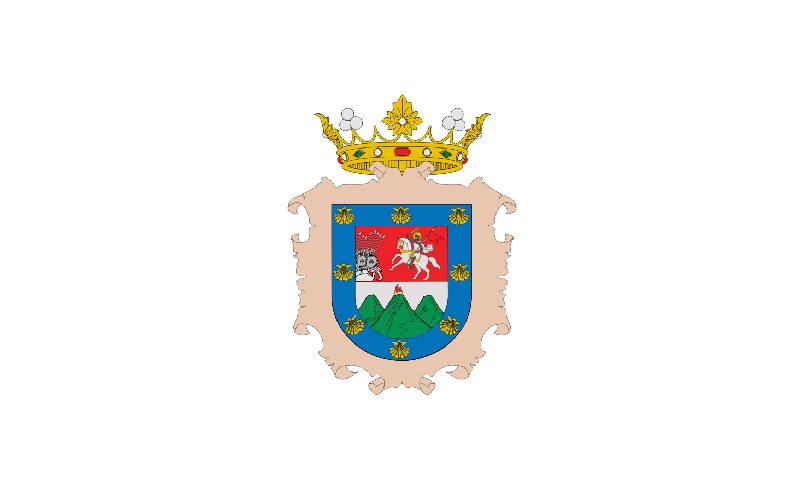
Ciudad Vieja

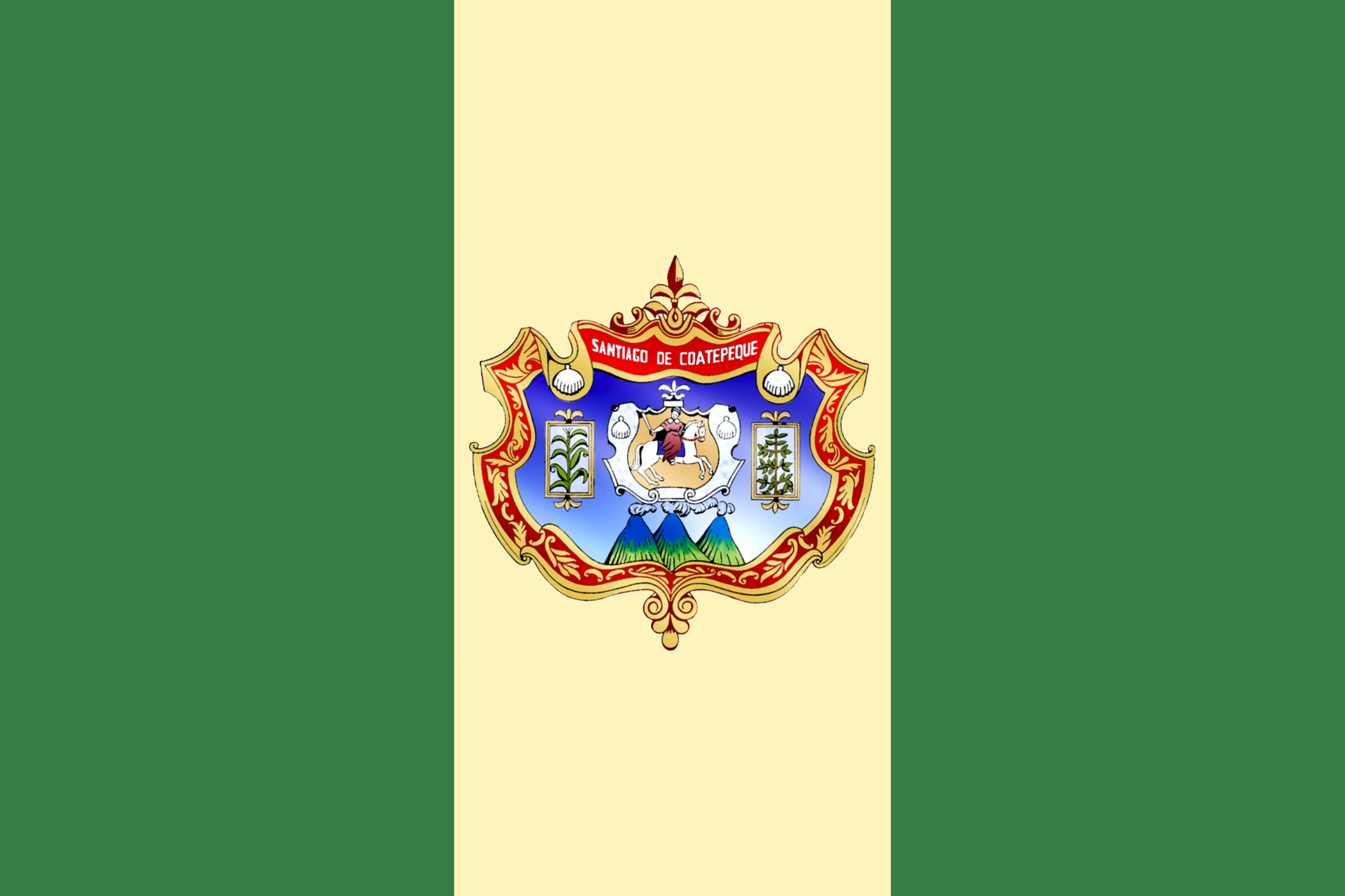
Coatepeque

Cobán

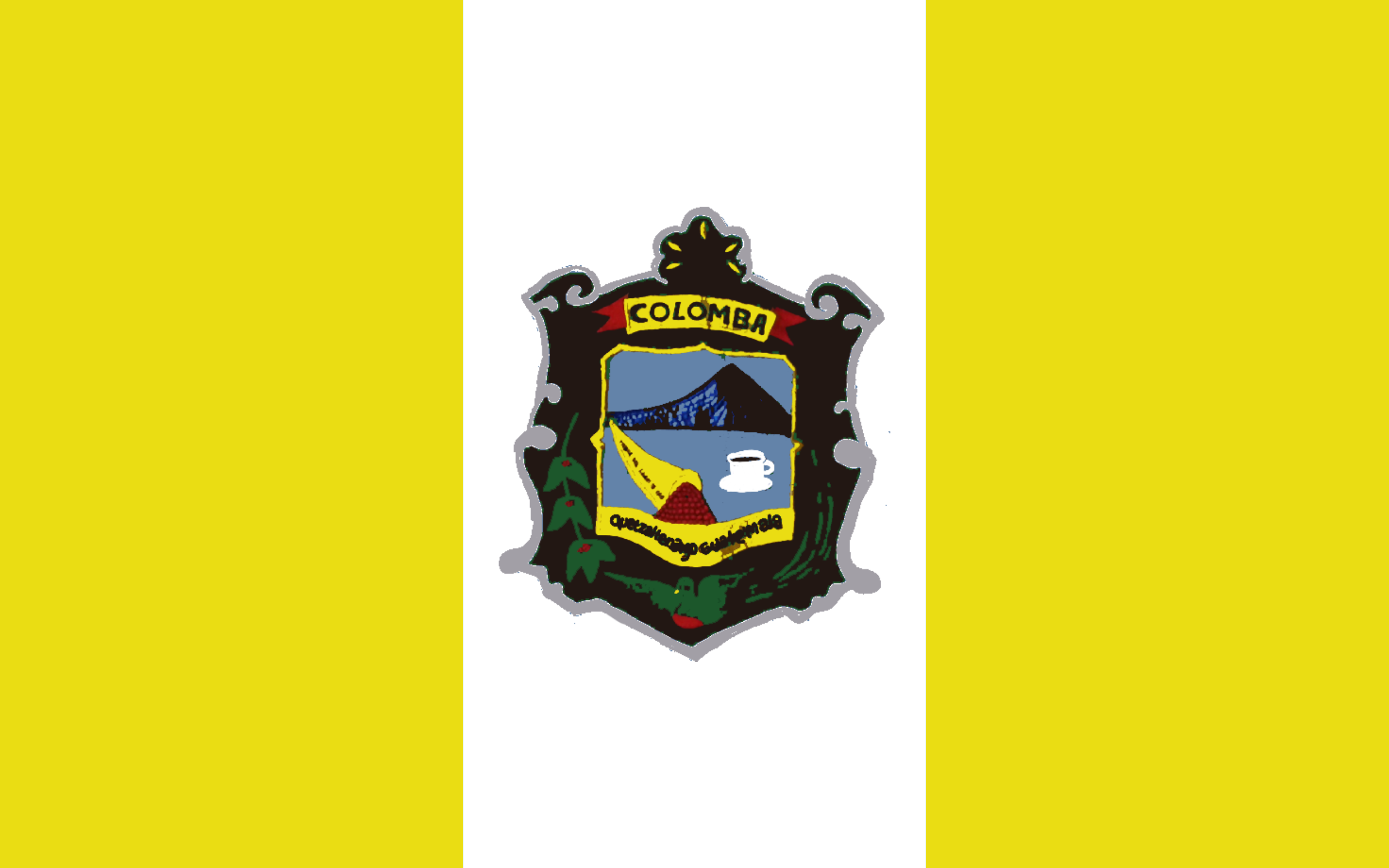
Colomba

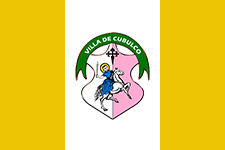
Cubulco

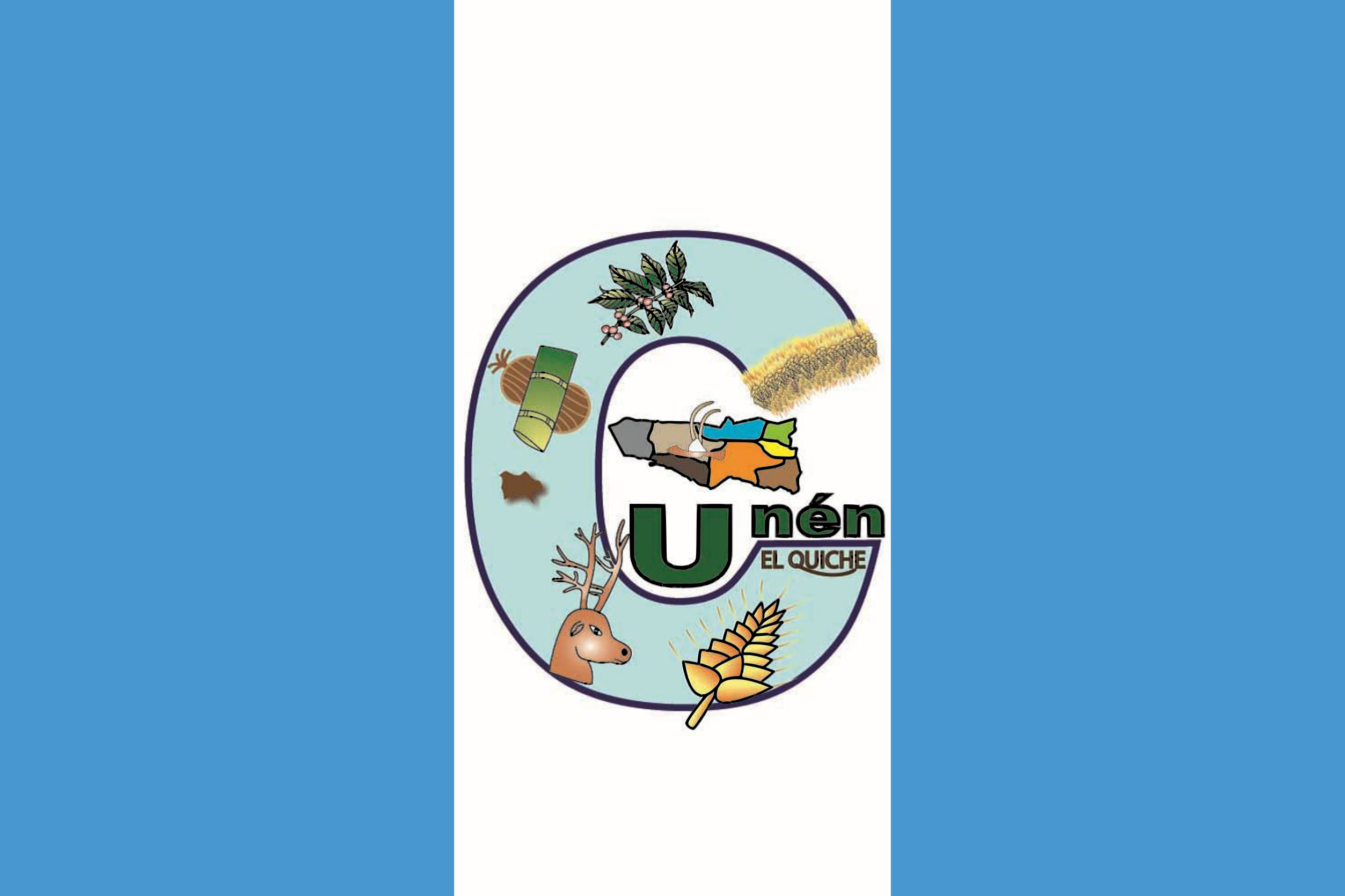
Cunén

Escuintla

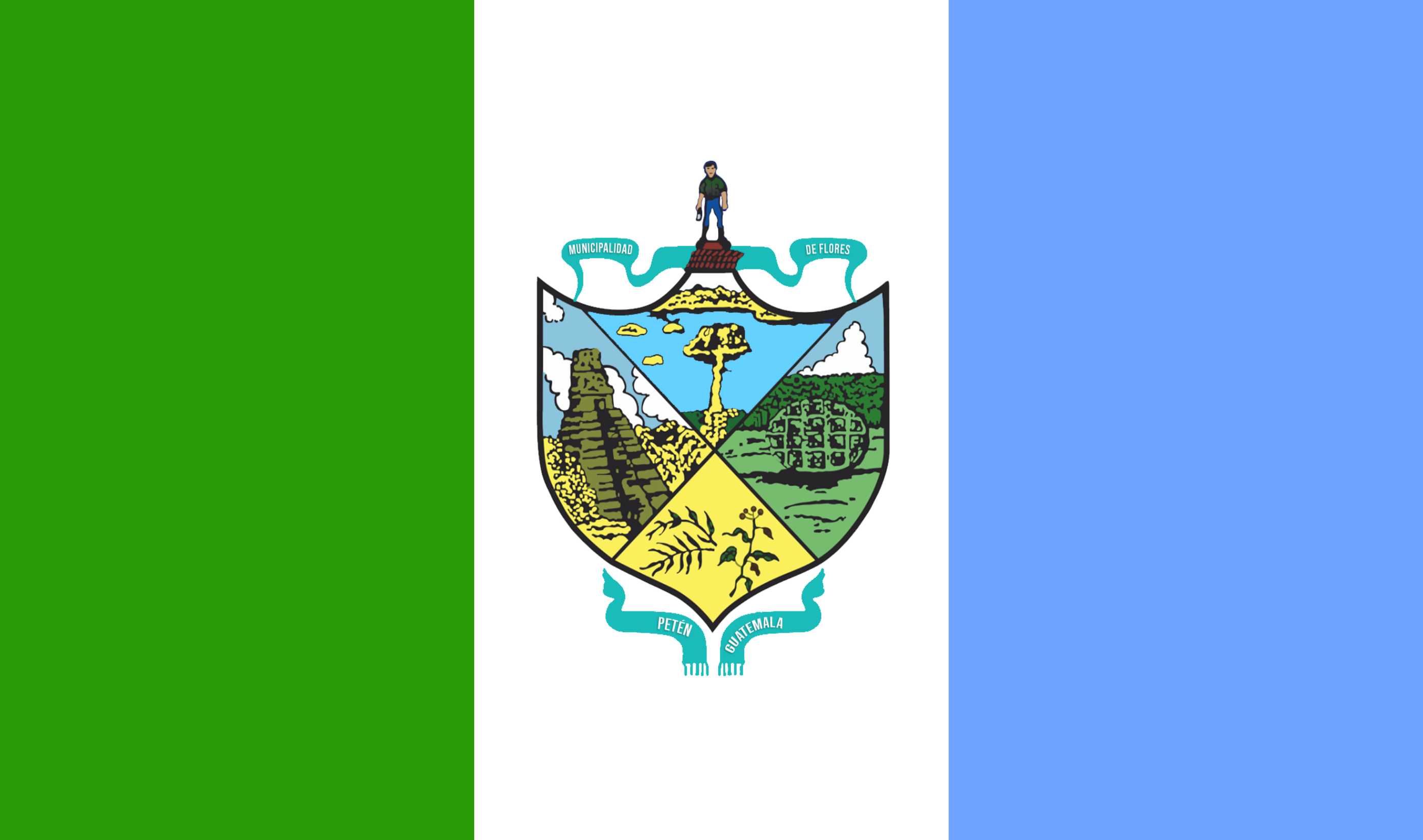
Flores

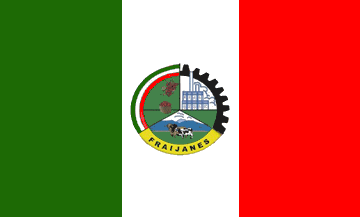
Fraijanes

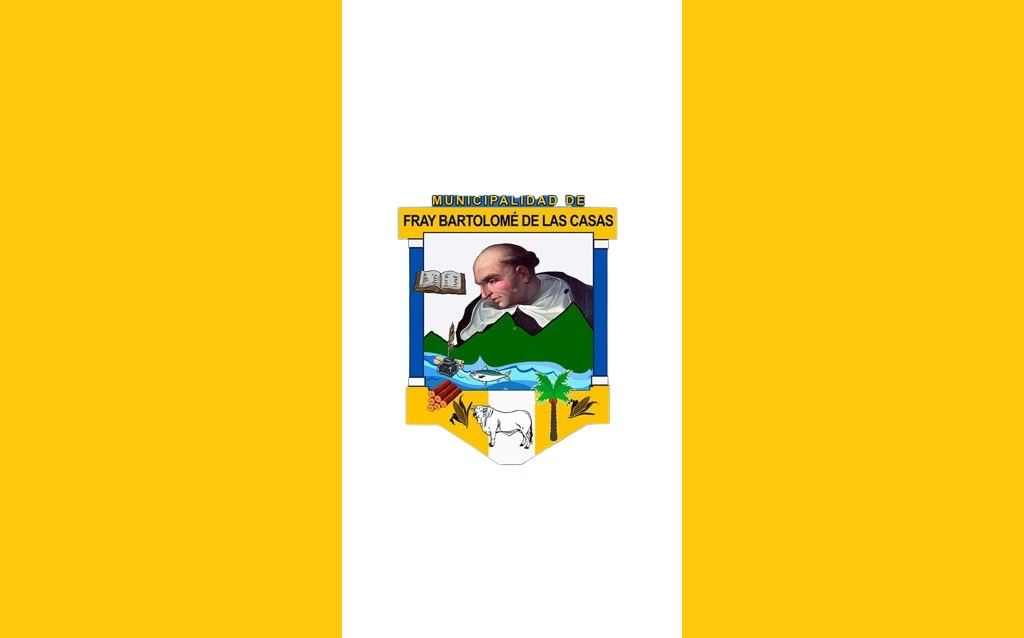
Fray Bartolomé de las Casas

Guatemala City

Huehuetenango

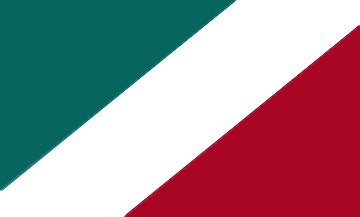
Ipala

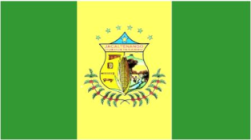
Jacaltenango

Jalapa

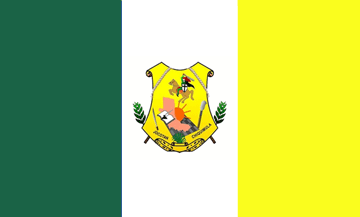
Jocotán

Jutiapa

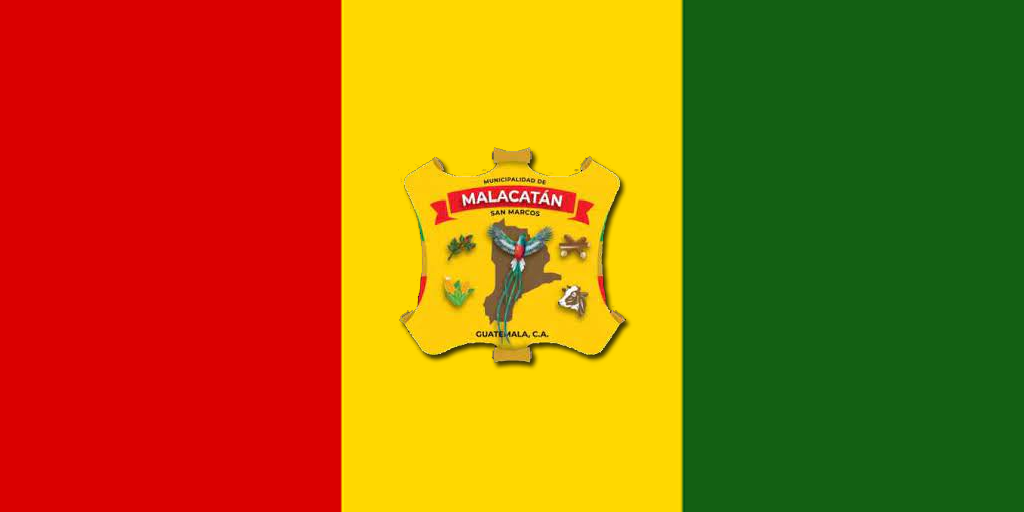
Malacatán

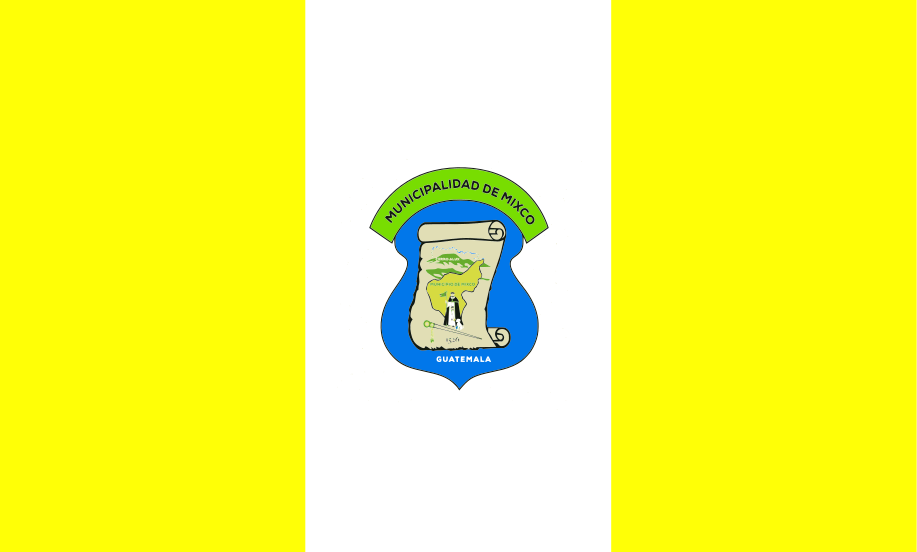
Mixco

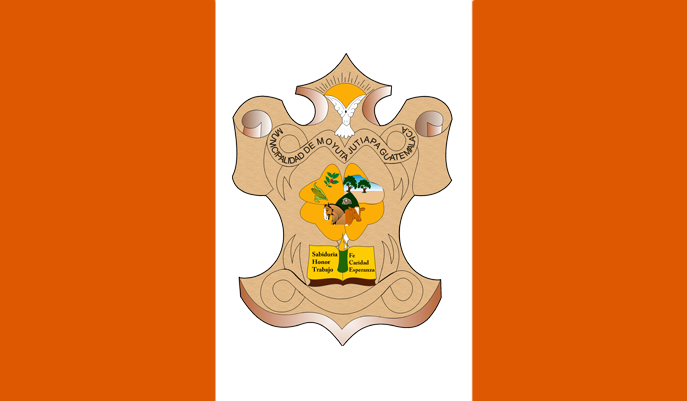
Moyuta

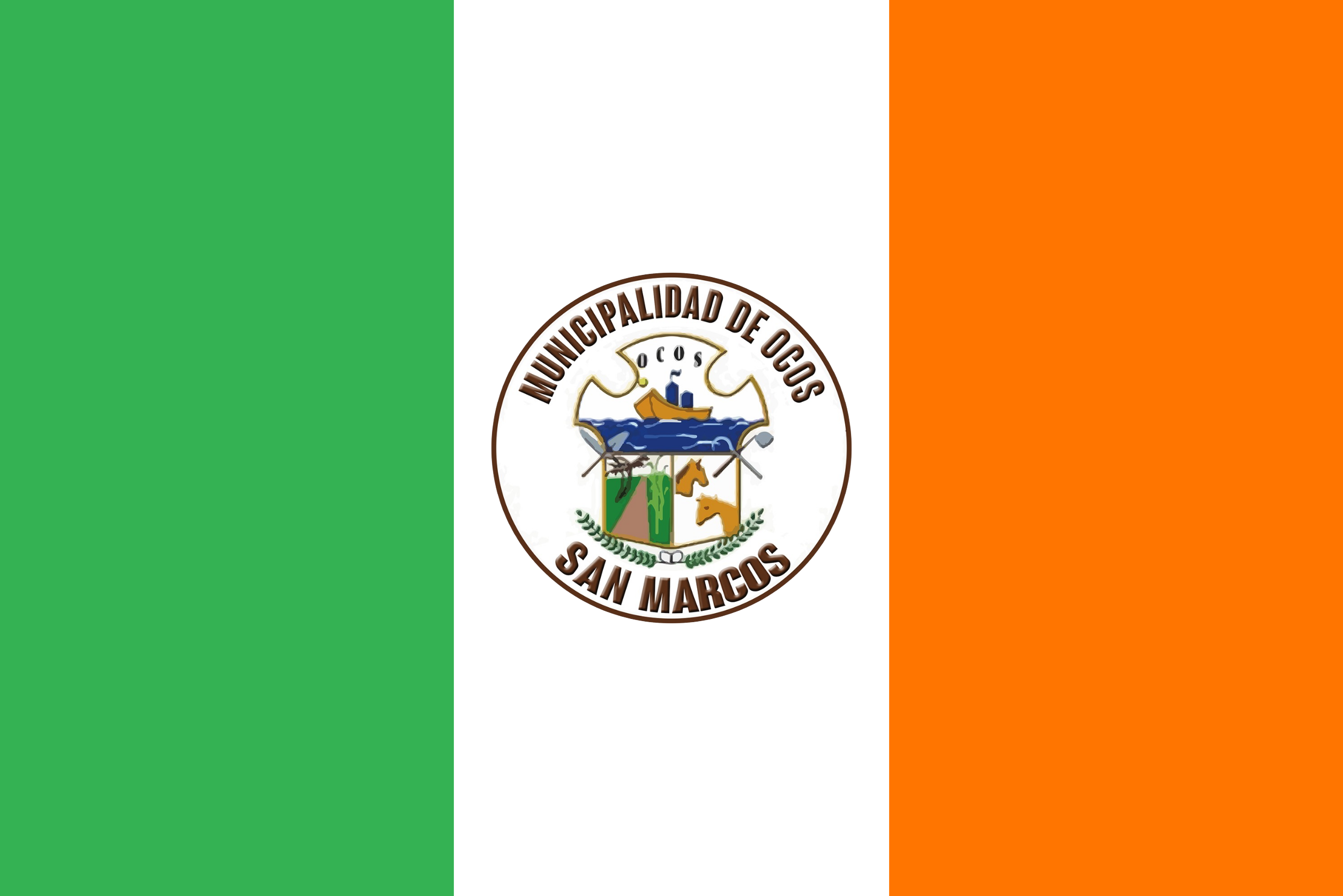
Ocós

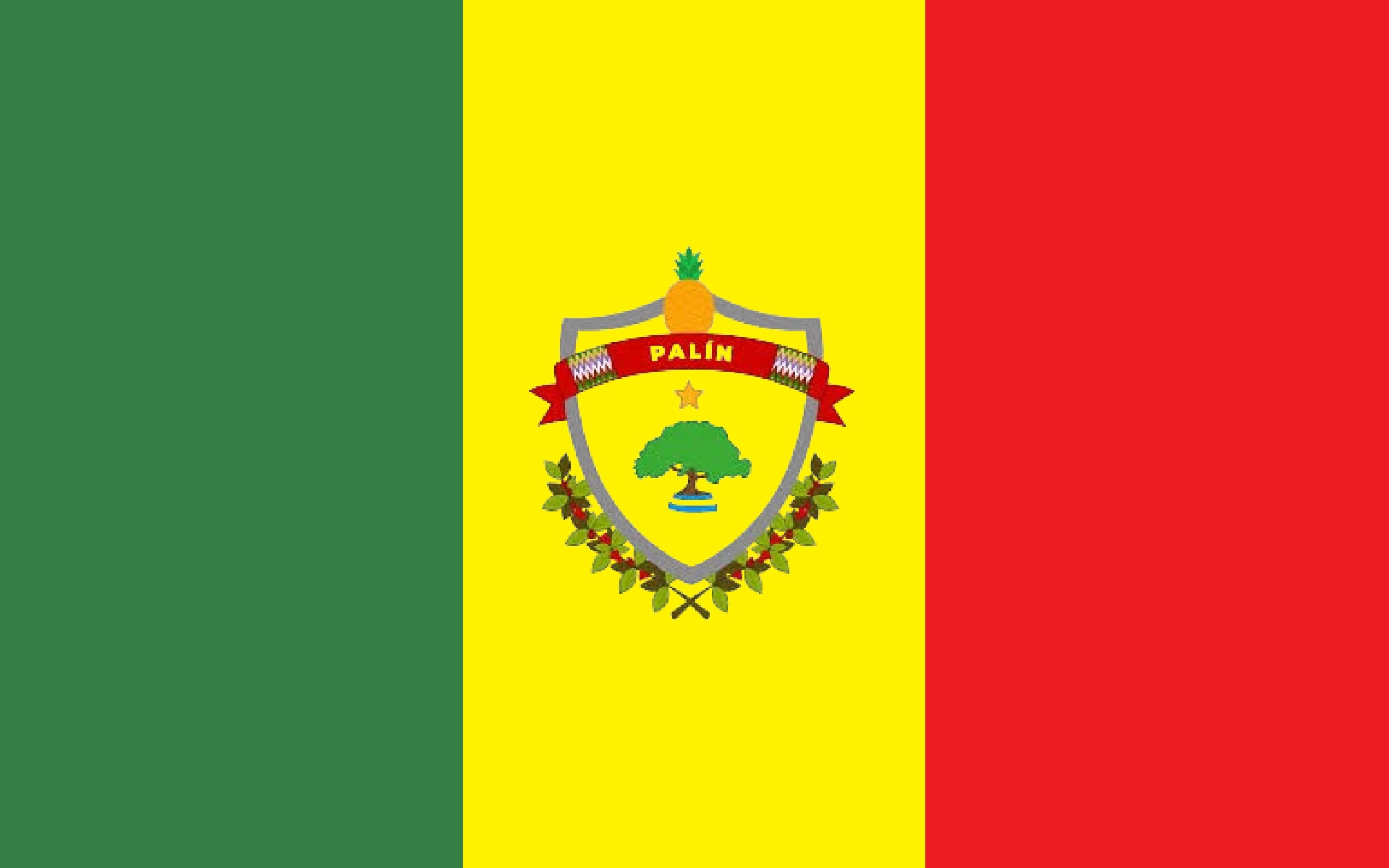
Palín

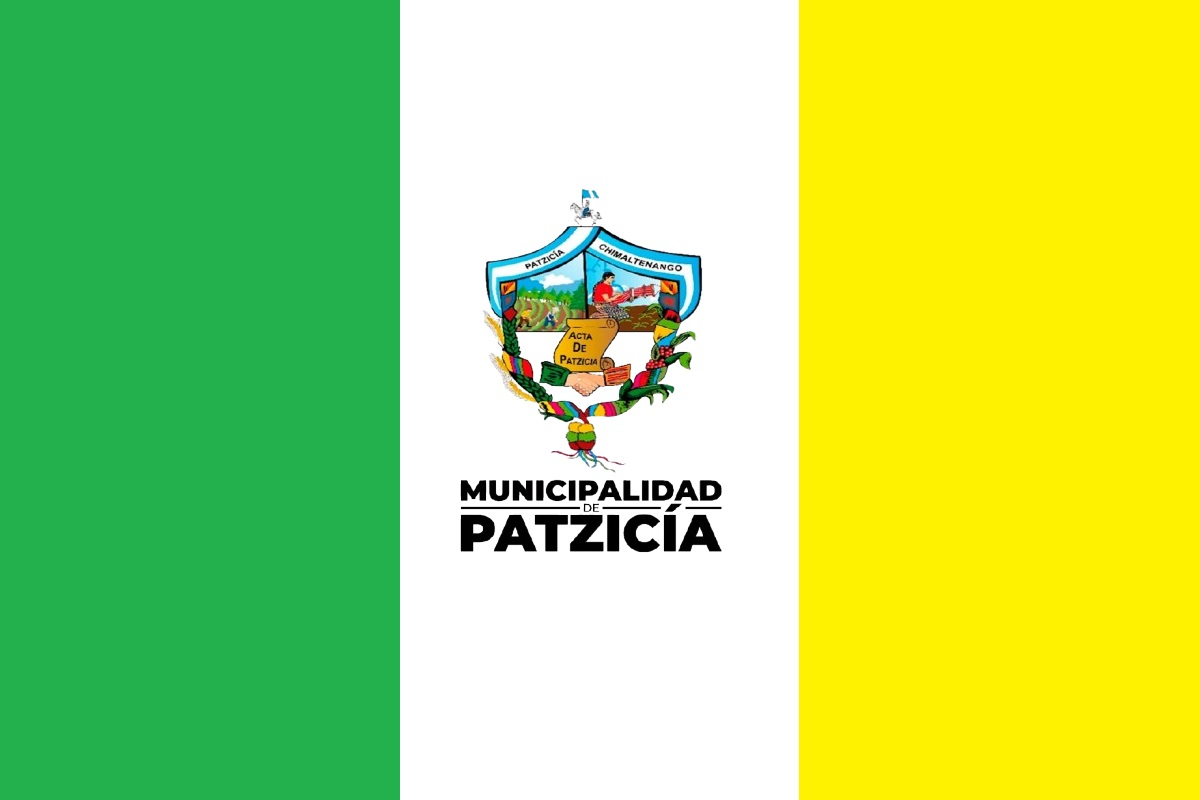
Patzicía

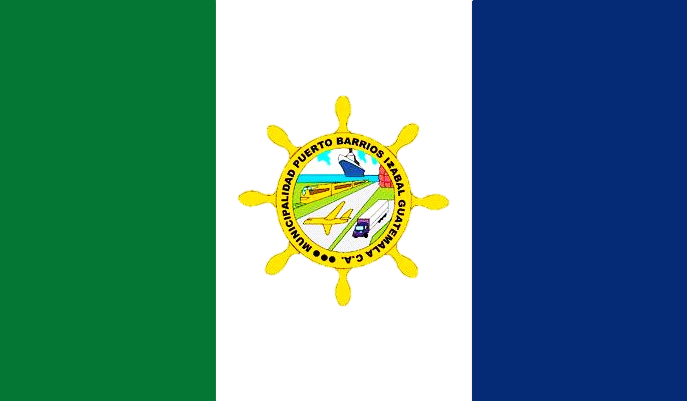
Puerto Barrios

Quetzaltenango

Retalhuleu

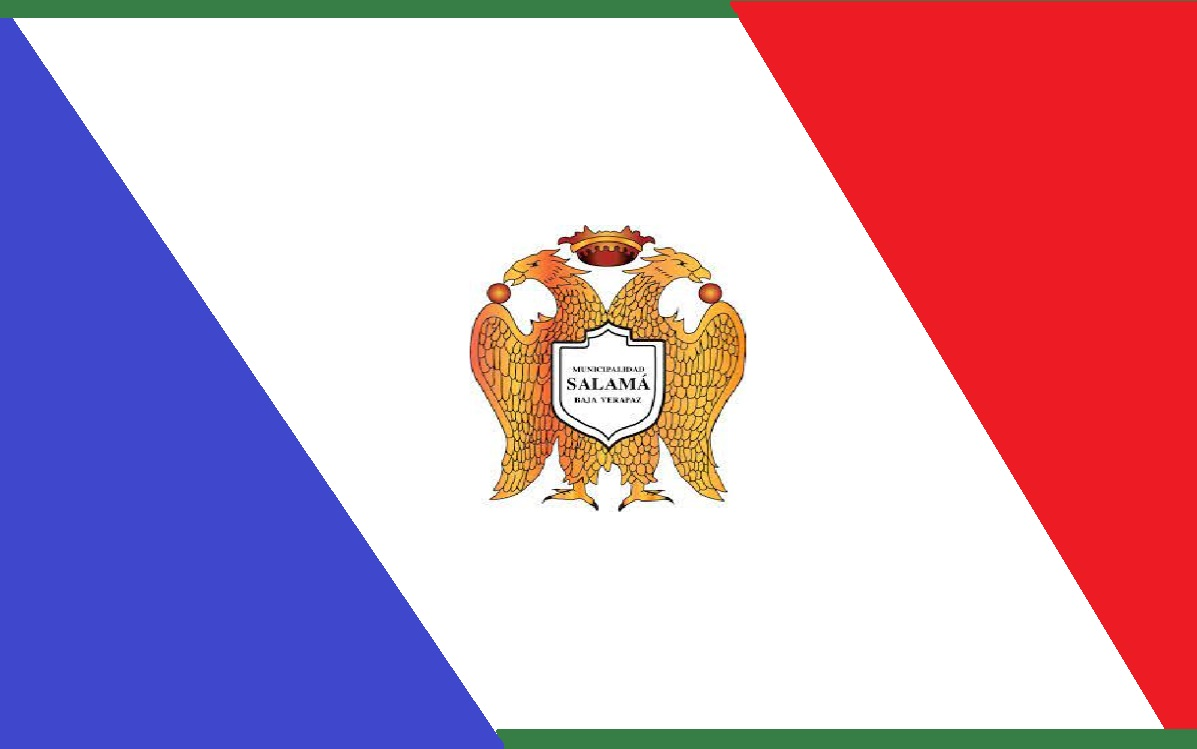
Salamá

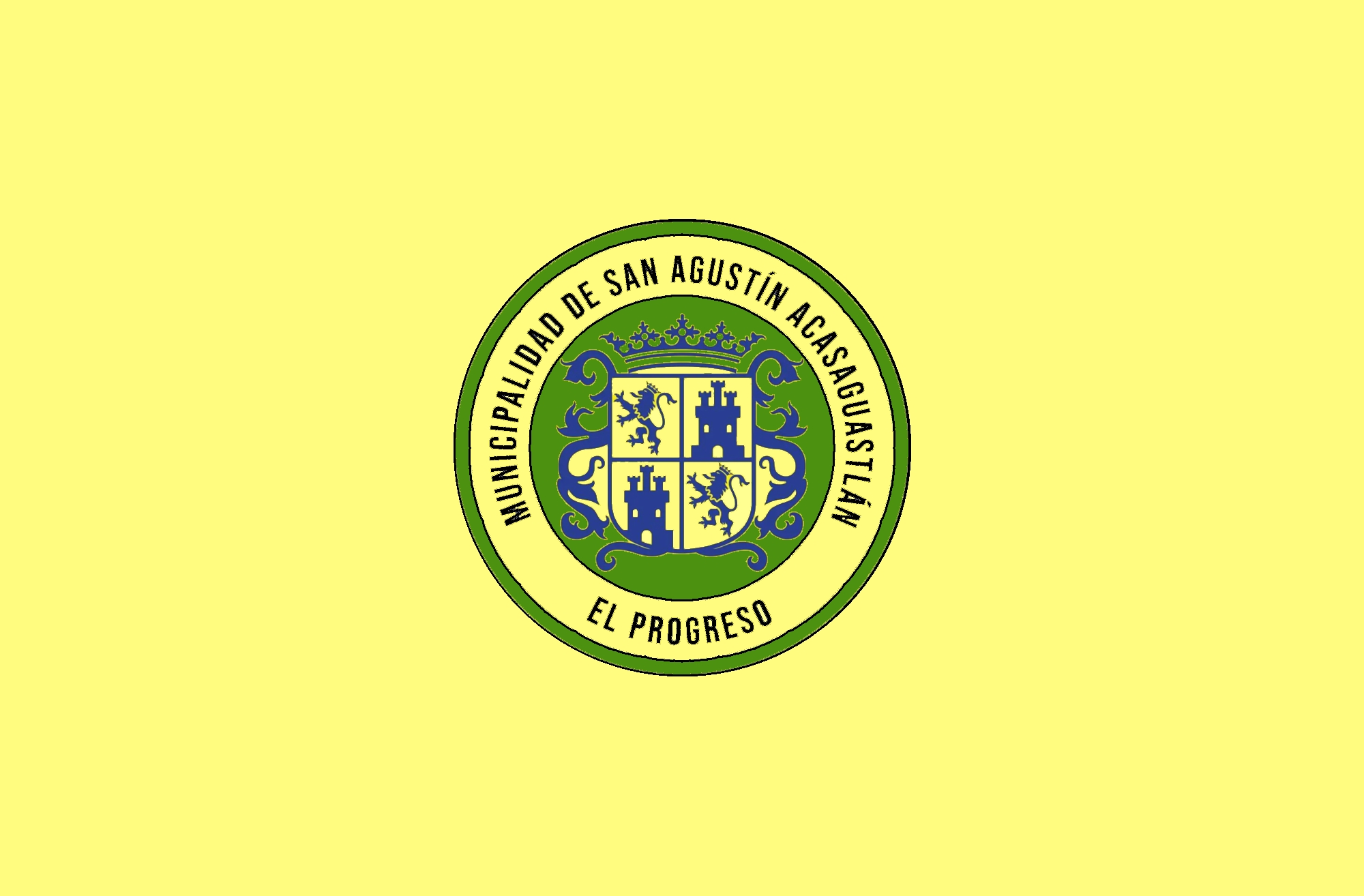
San Agustín Acasaguastlán

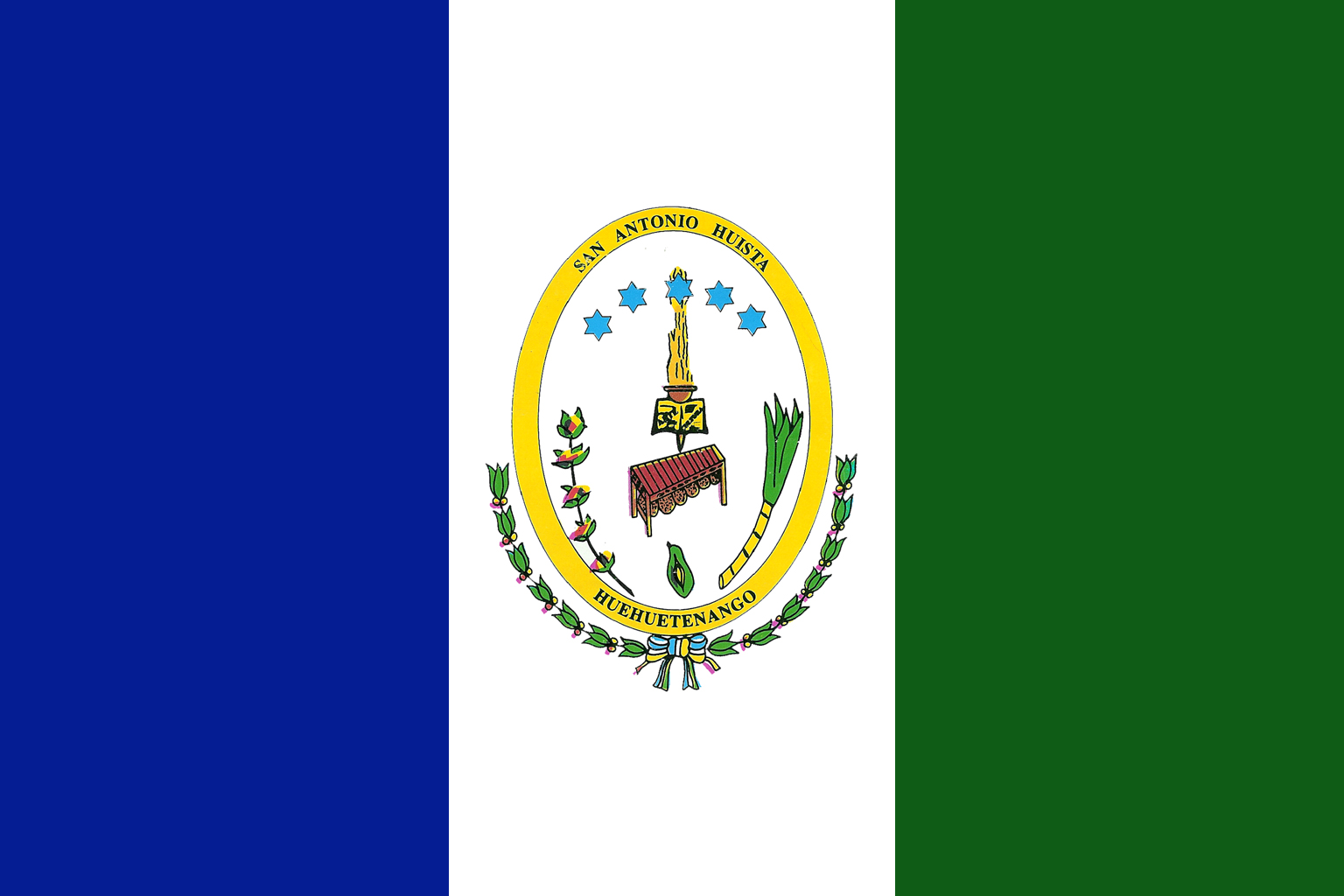
San Antonio Huista

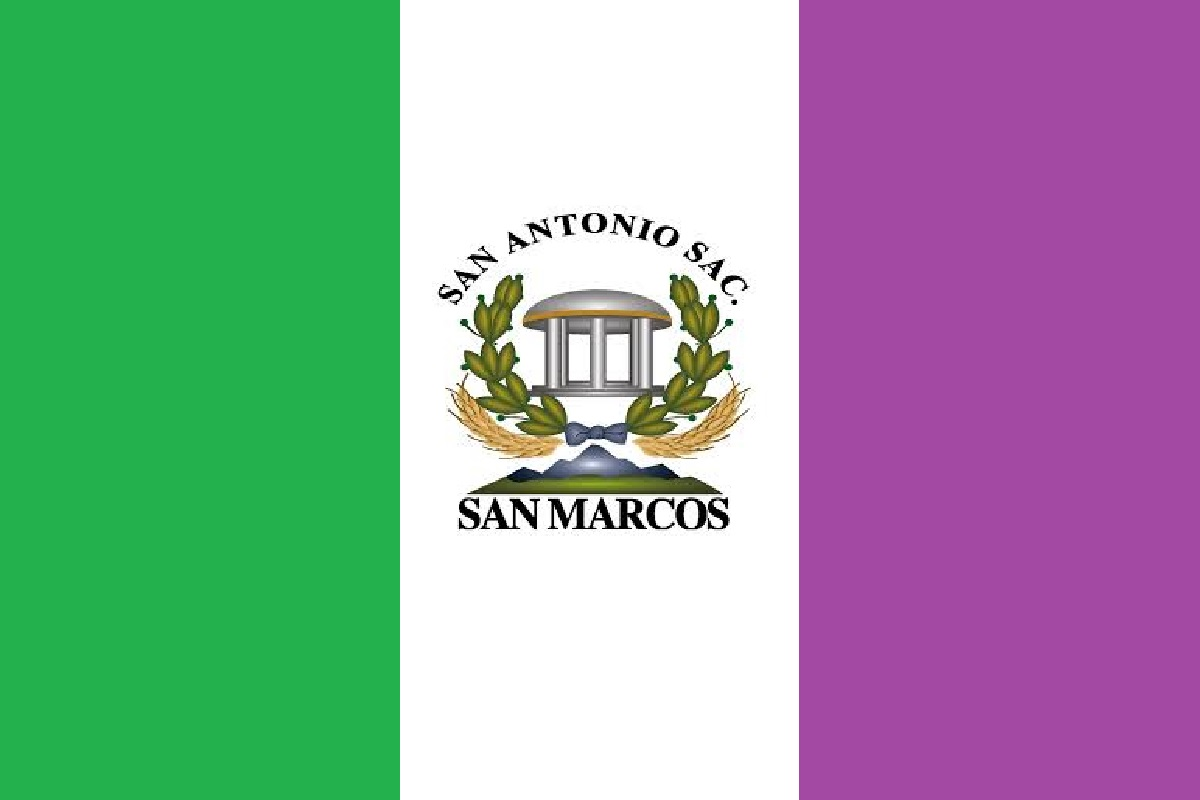
San Antonio Sacatepéquez

San Carlos Sija

San José la Arada

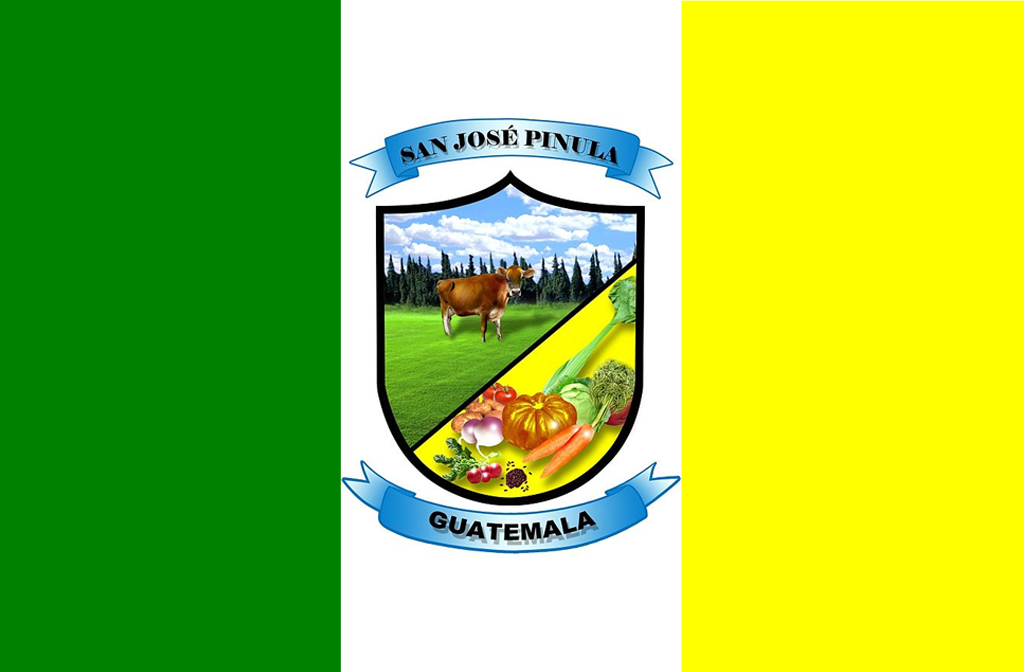
San José Pinula

San Juan Ostuncalco

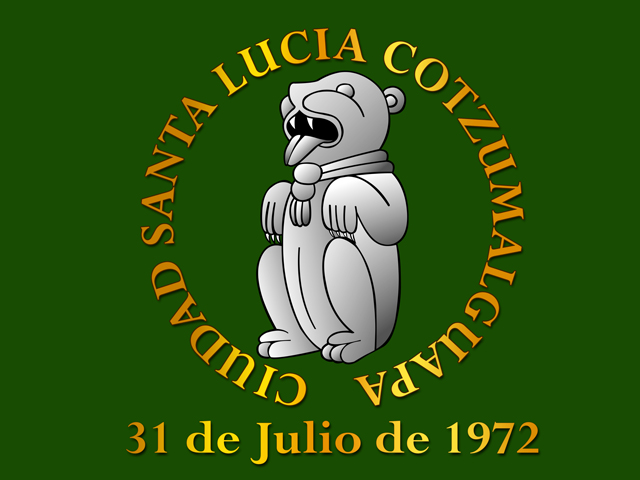
Santa Lucía Cotzumalguapa

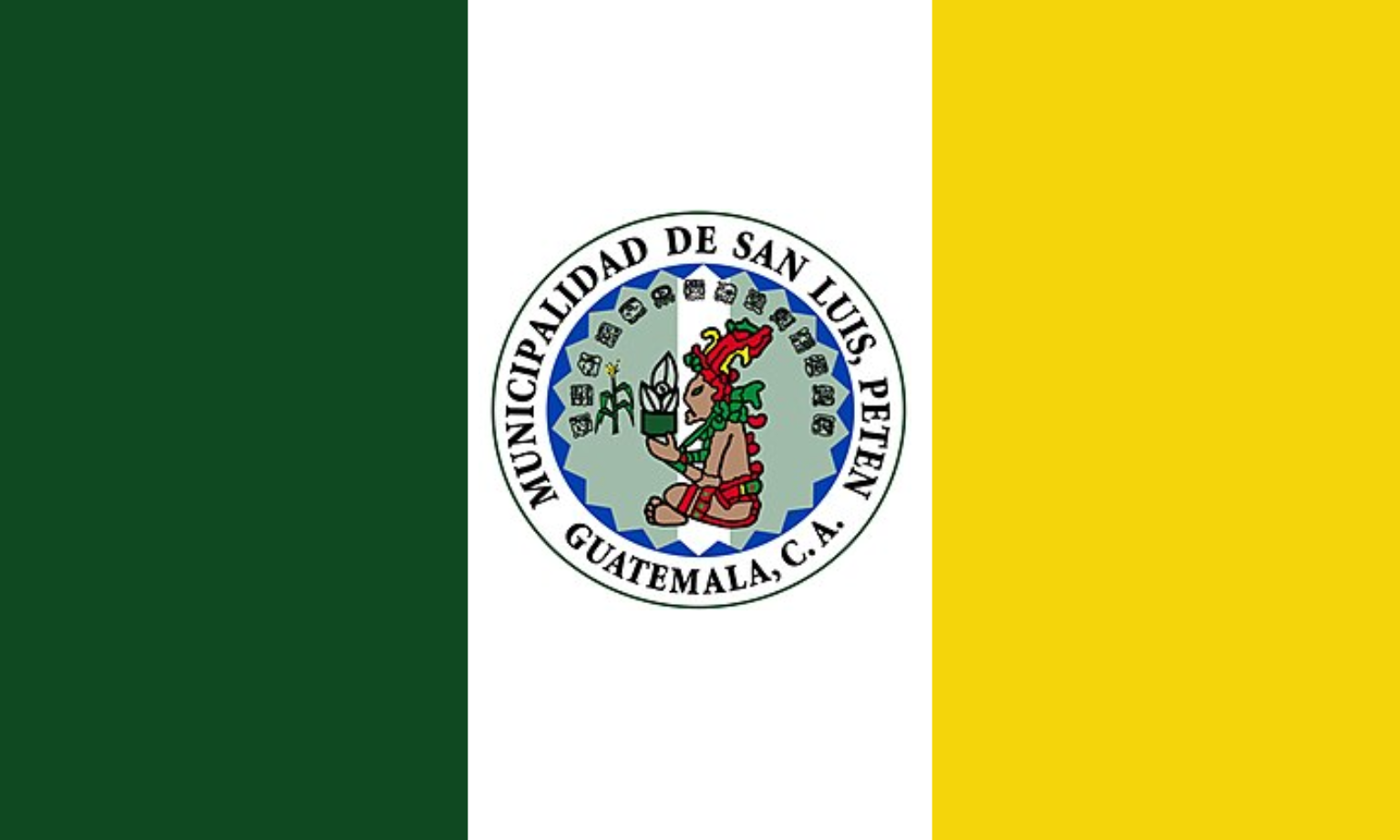
San Luis

San Marcos

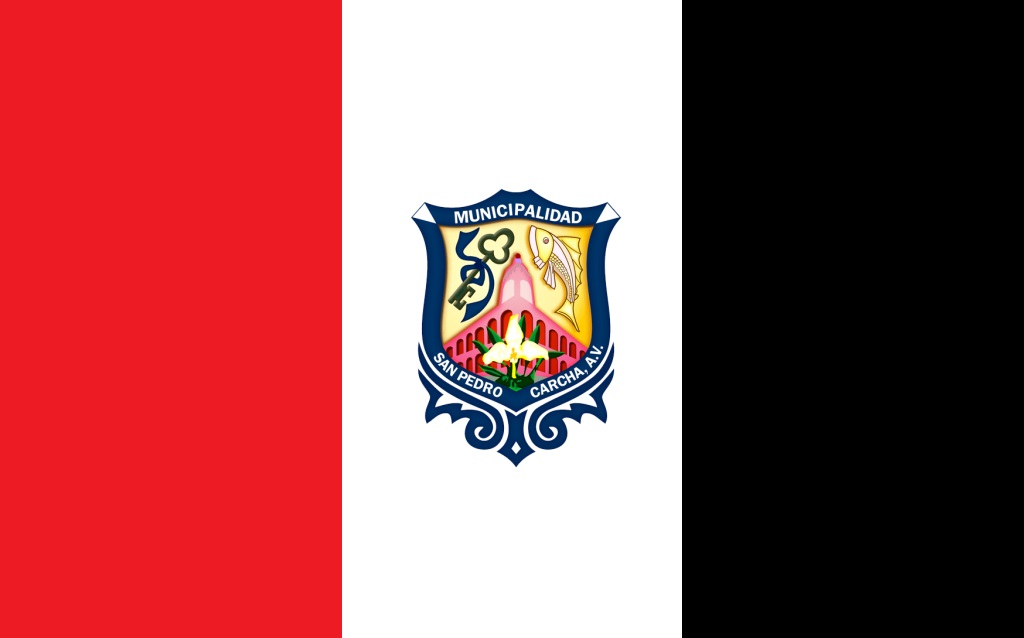
San Pedro Carchá

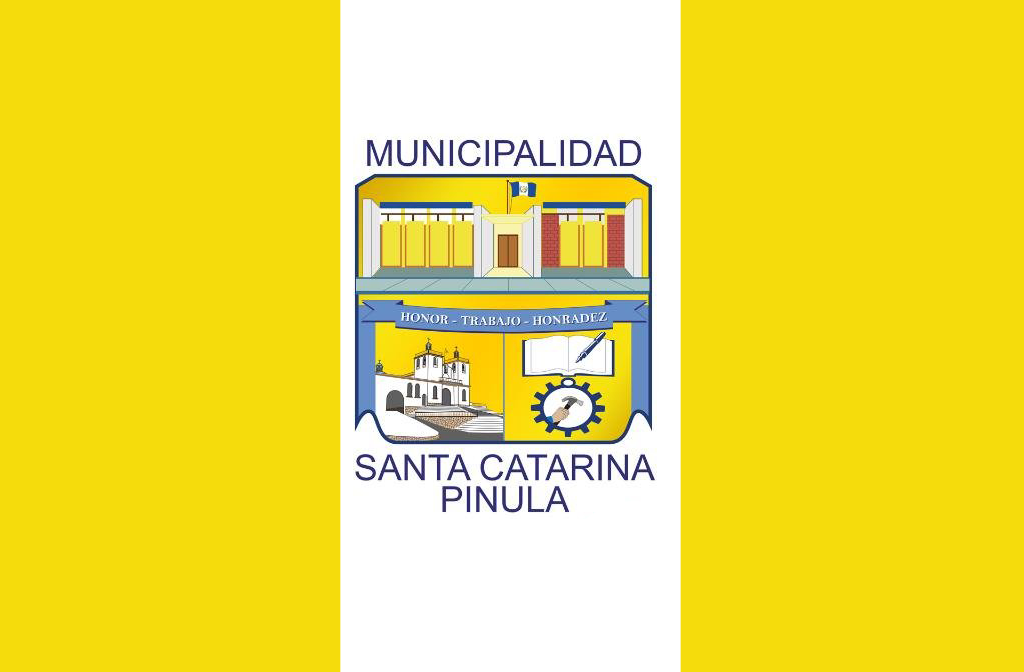
Santa Catarina Pinula

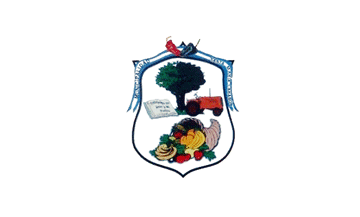
Santa María Cahabón

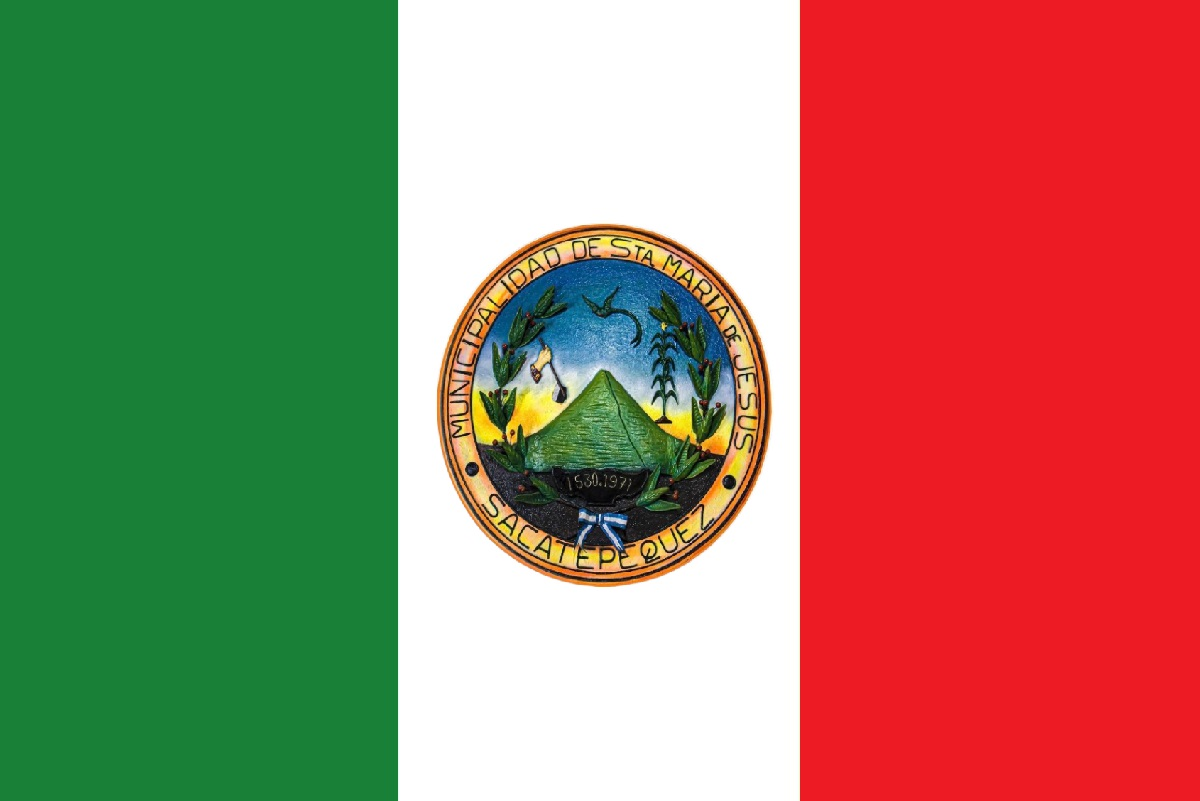
Santa María de Jesús

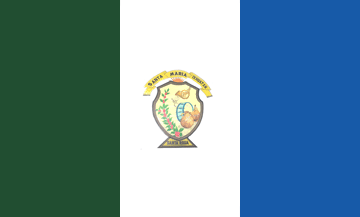
Santa María Ixhuatán

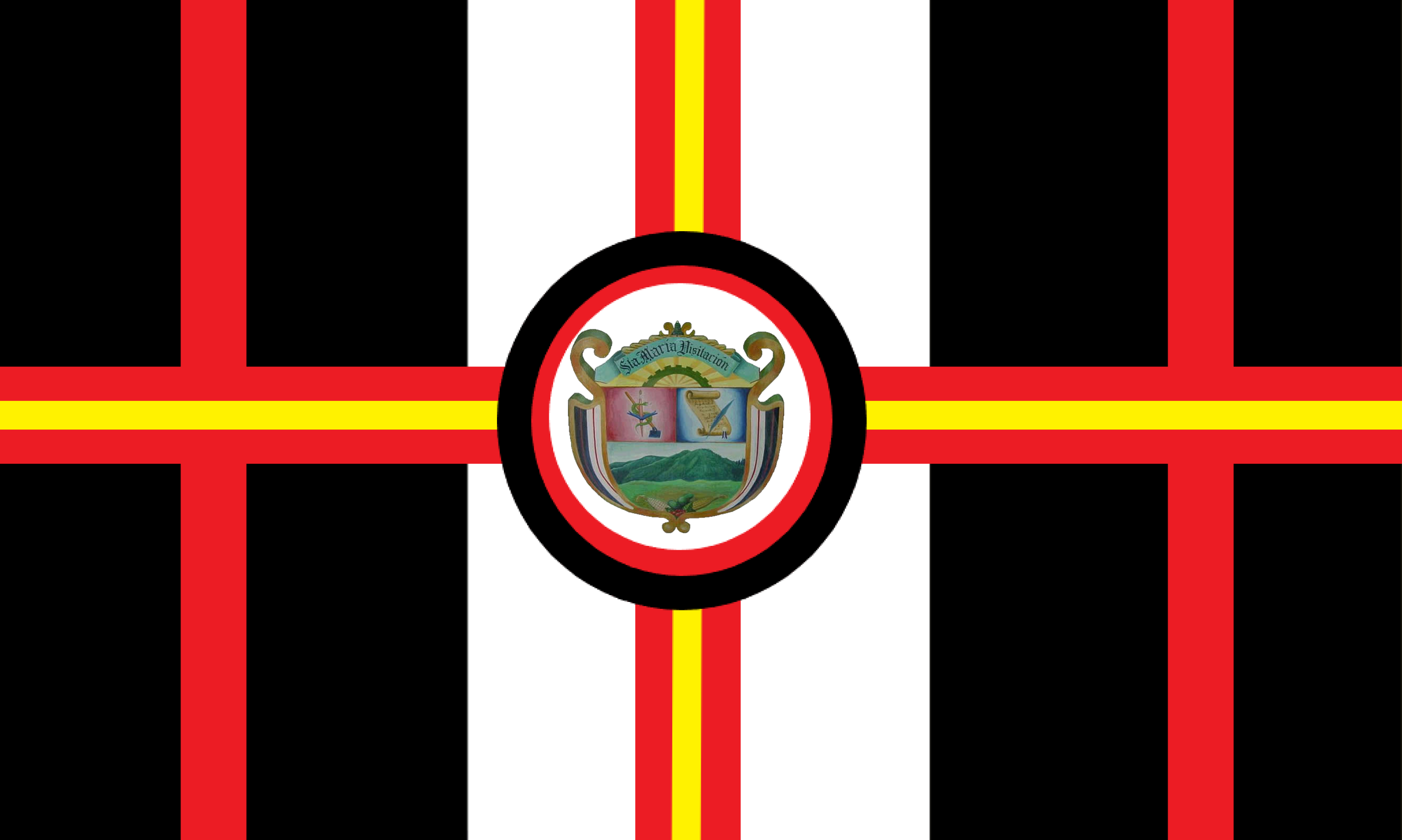
Santa María Visitación

Sololá

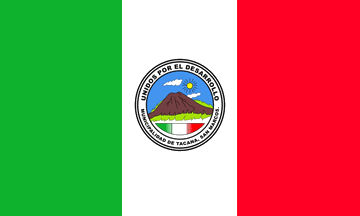
Tacaná

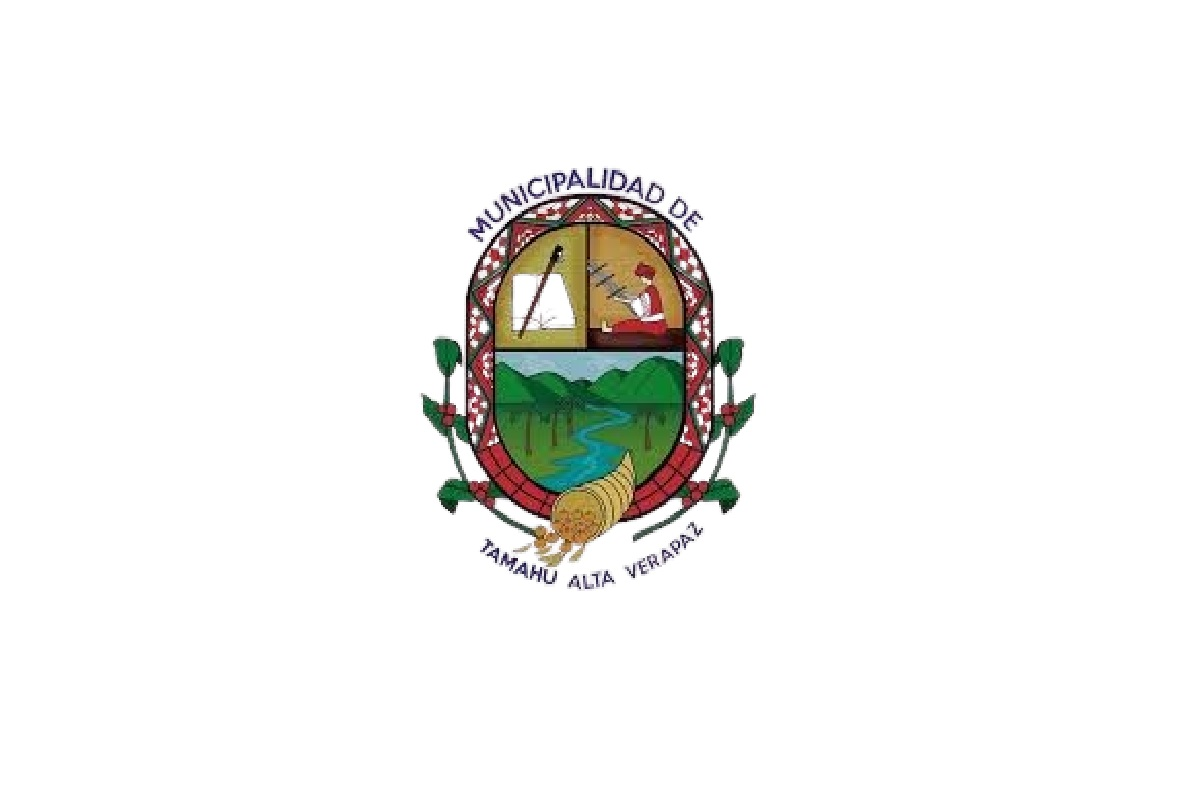
Tamahú

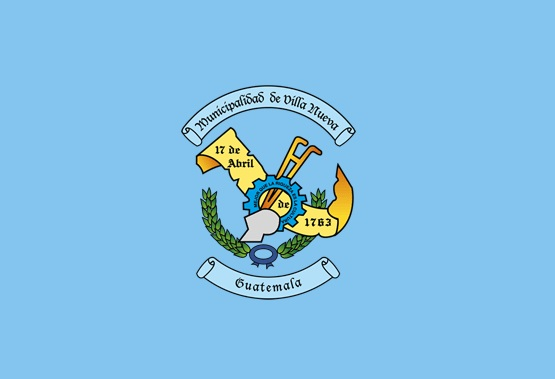
Villa Nueva

== Haiti ==
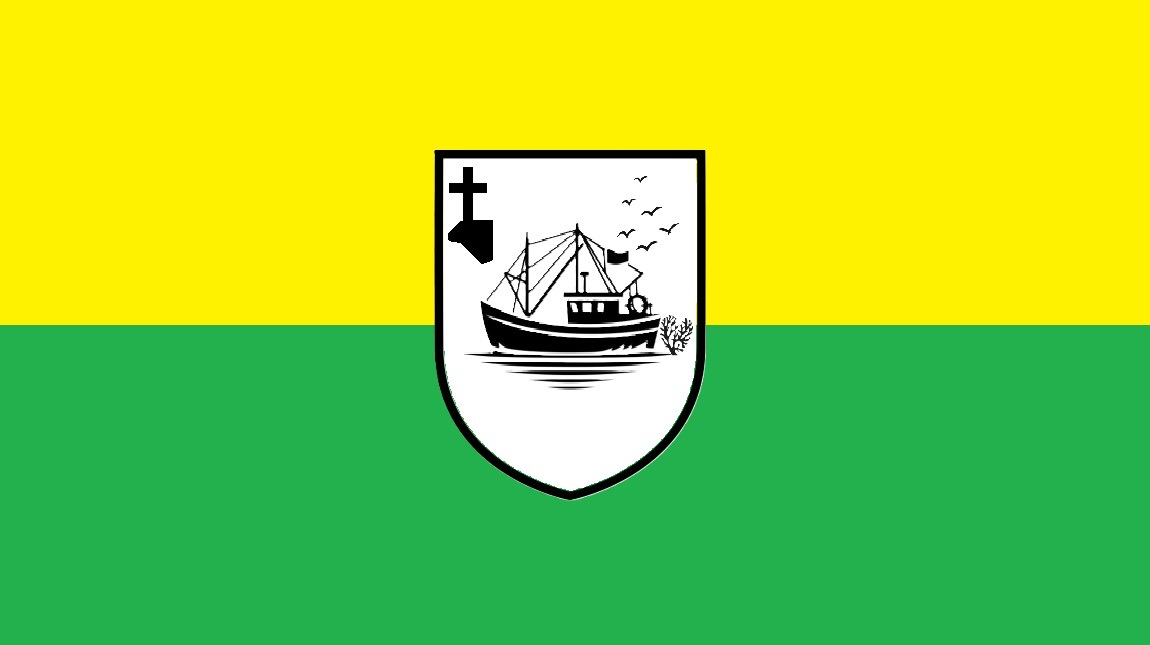
Gonaïves

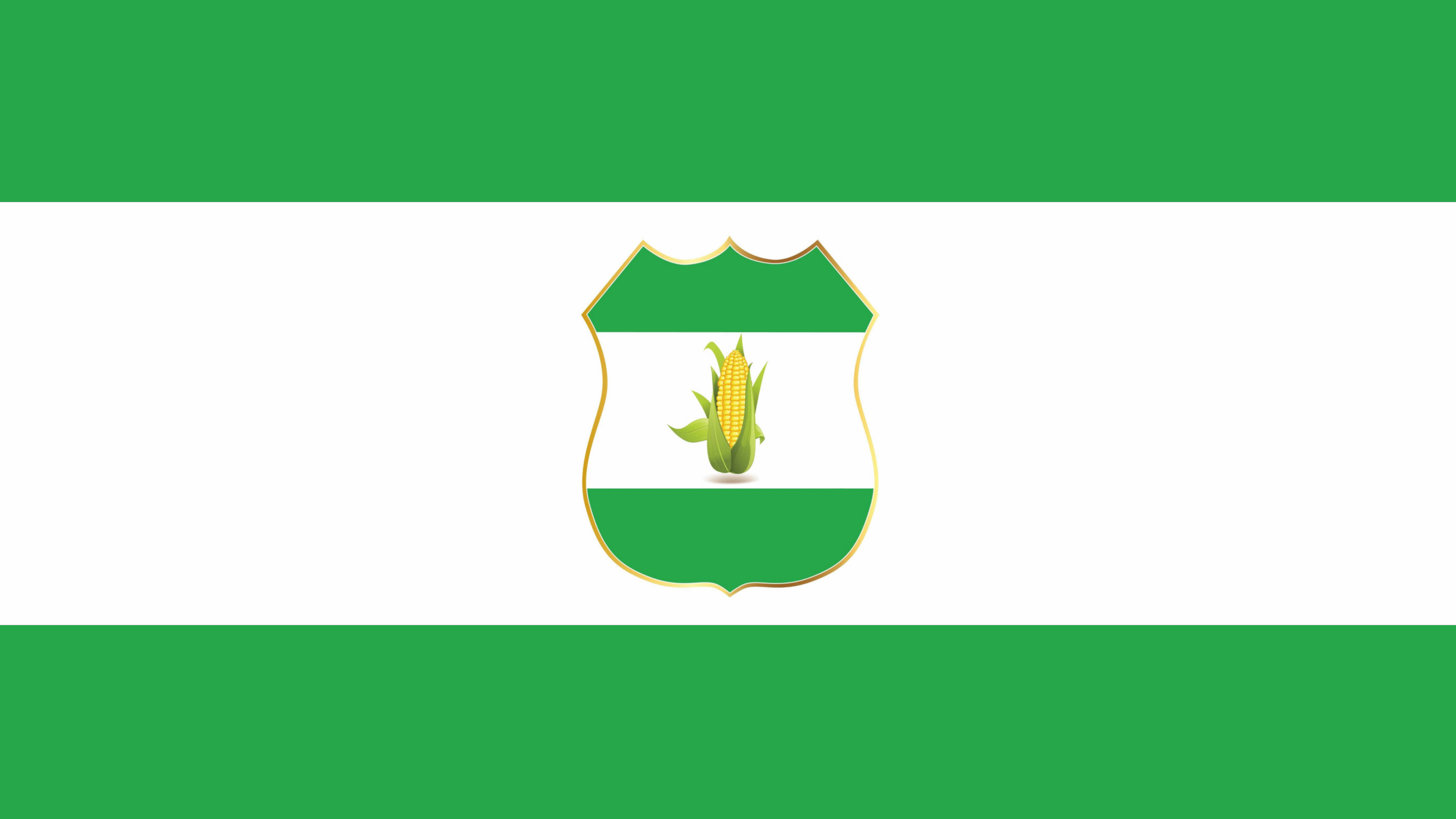
Les Cayes

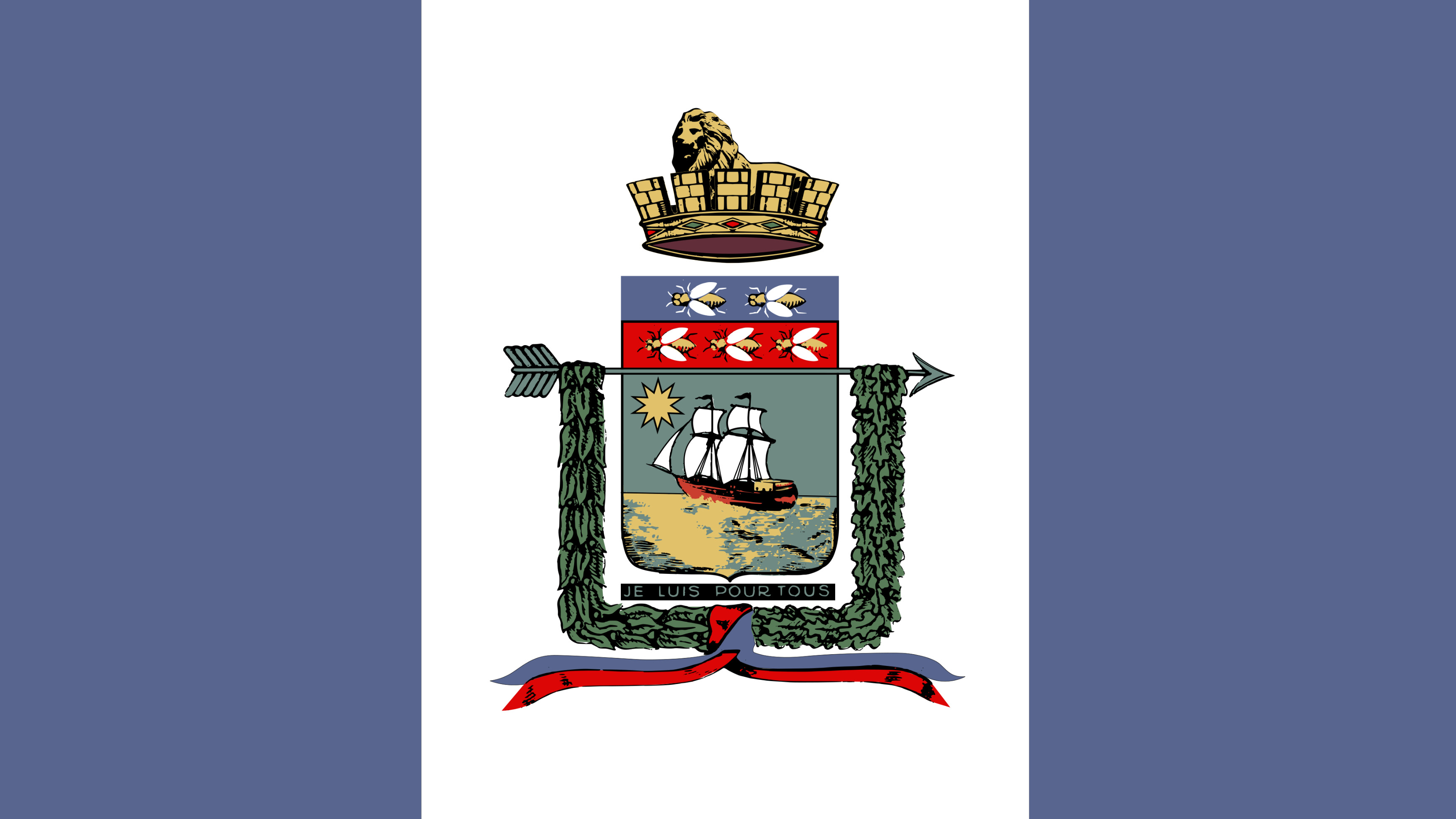
Port-au-Prince

== Honduras ==
Amapala

Choloma

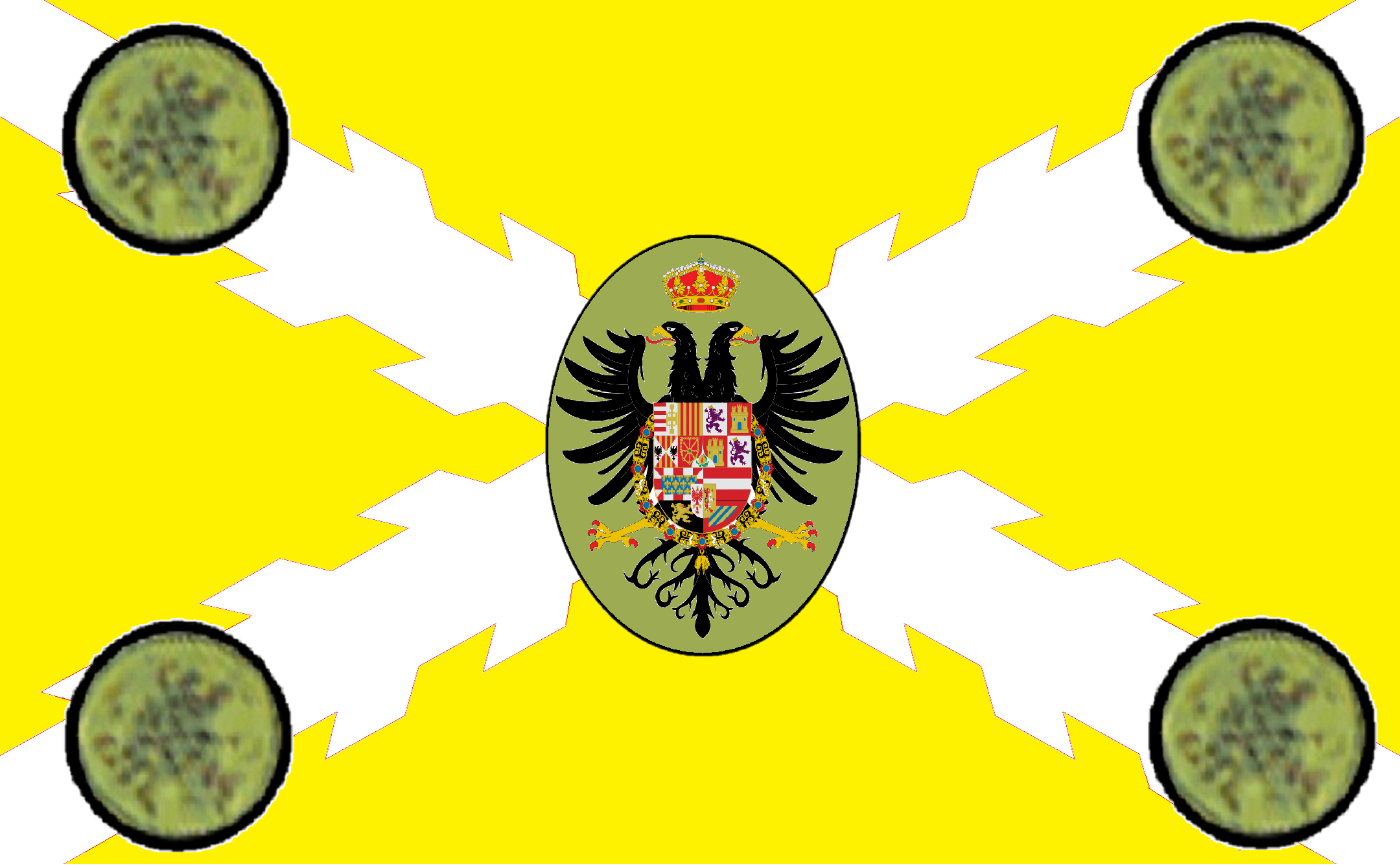
Comayagua

Copán Ruinas

El Progreso

Juticalpa

La Lima

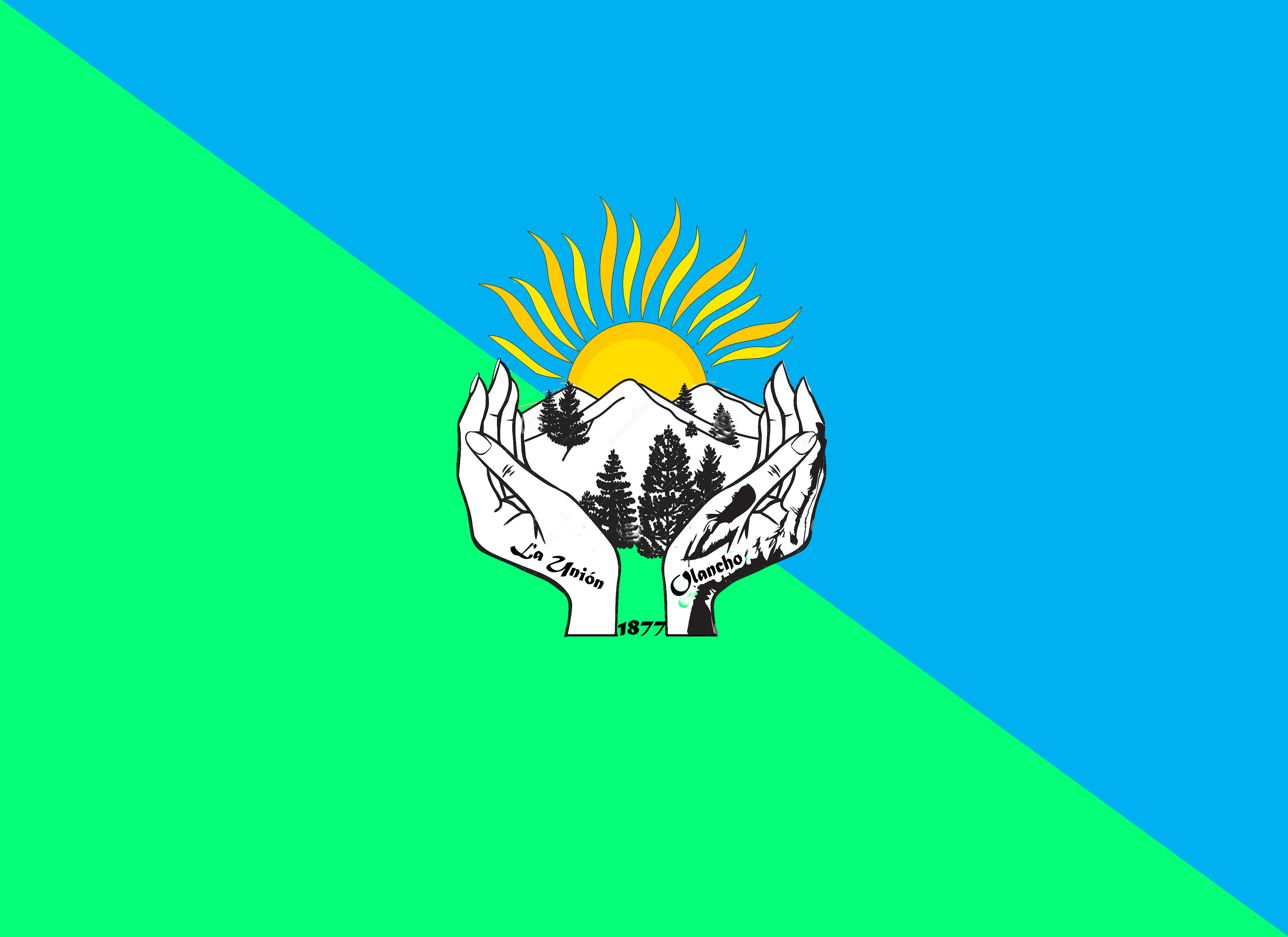
La Unión

Puerto Cortés

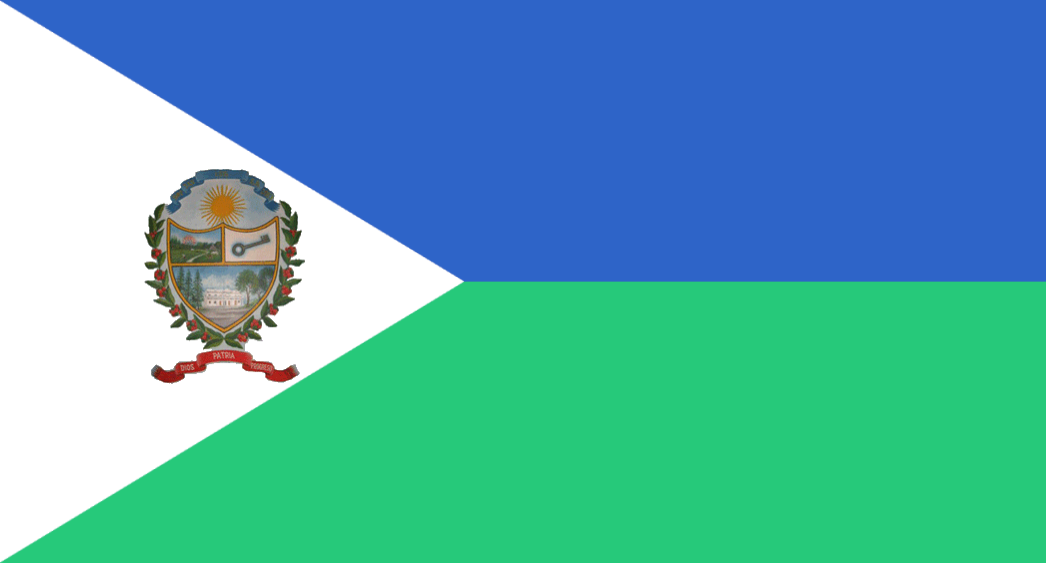
San Luis

San Pedro Sula

Santa Cruz de Yojoa

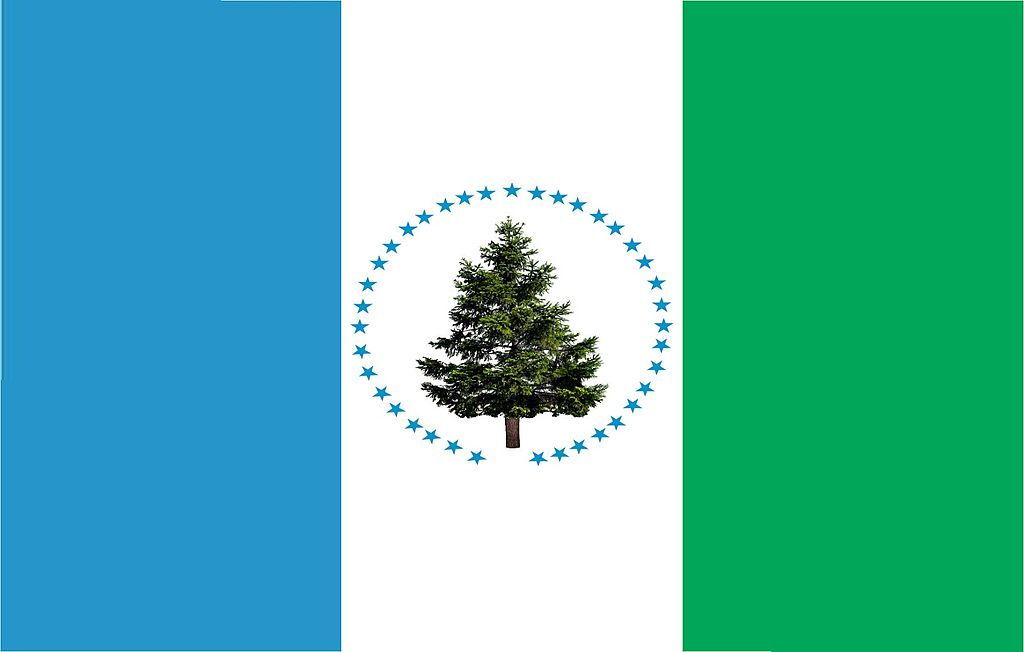
Siguatepeque

Talanga

Taulabé

Tegucigalpa

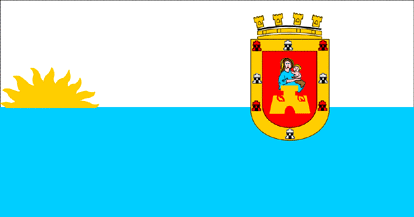
Trujillo

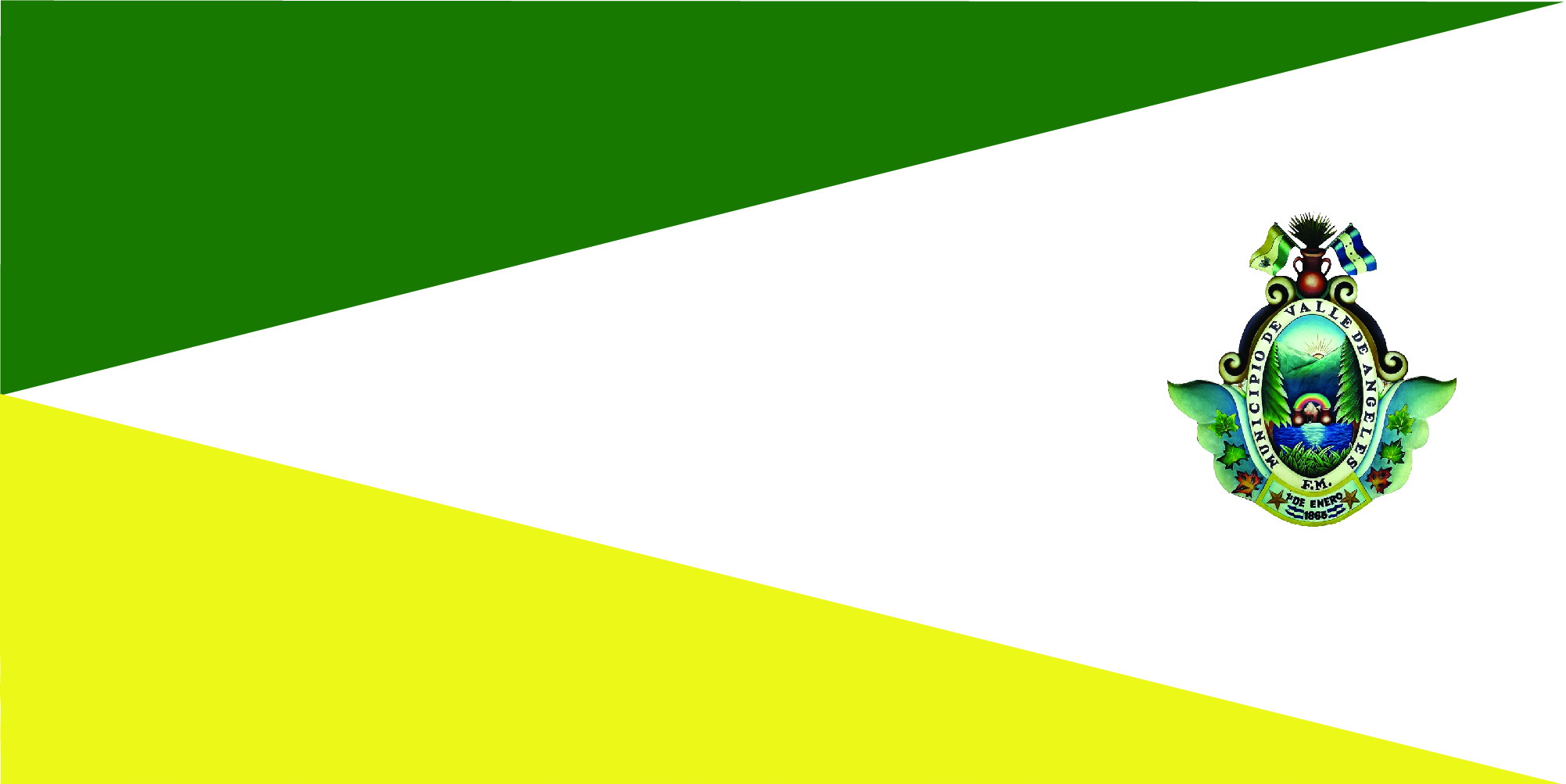
Valle de Ángeles

Yamaranguila

== Jamaica ==
Accompong

== Nicaragua ==
Acoyapa

Boaco

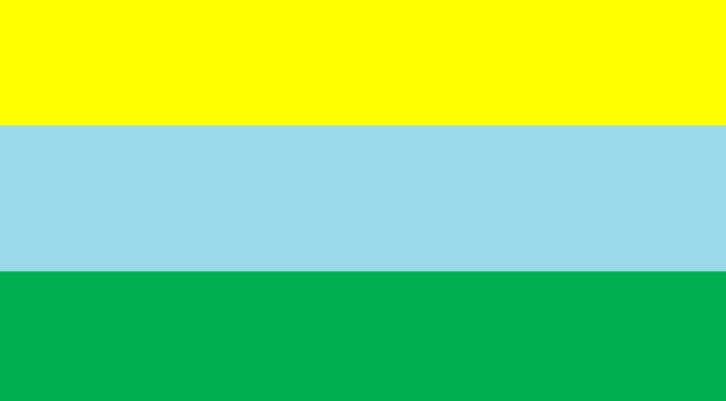
Buenos Aires

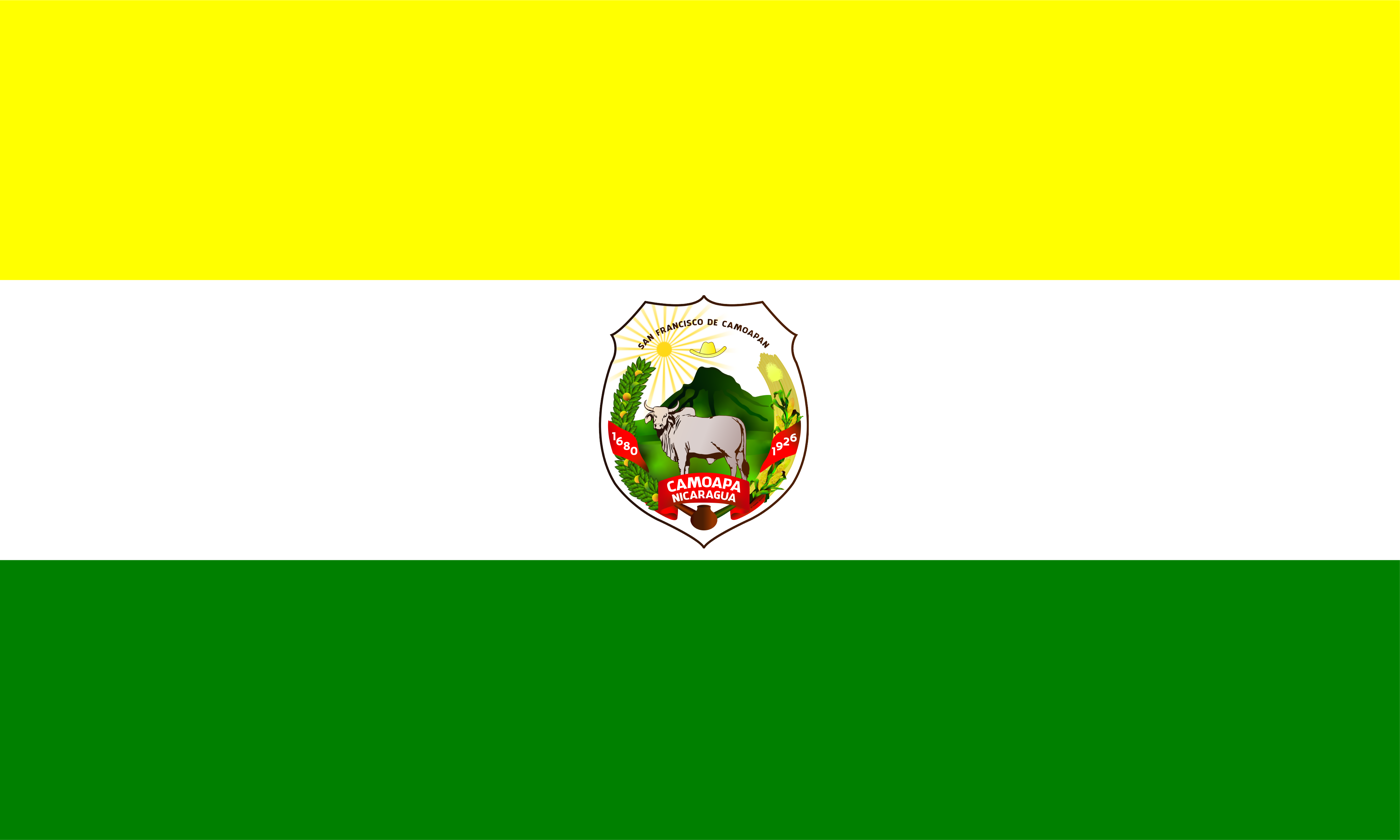
Camoapa

Chinandega

Ciudad Darío

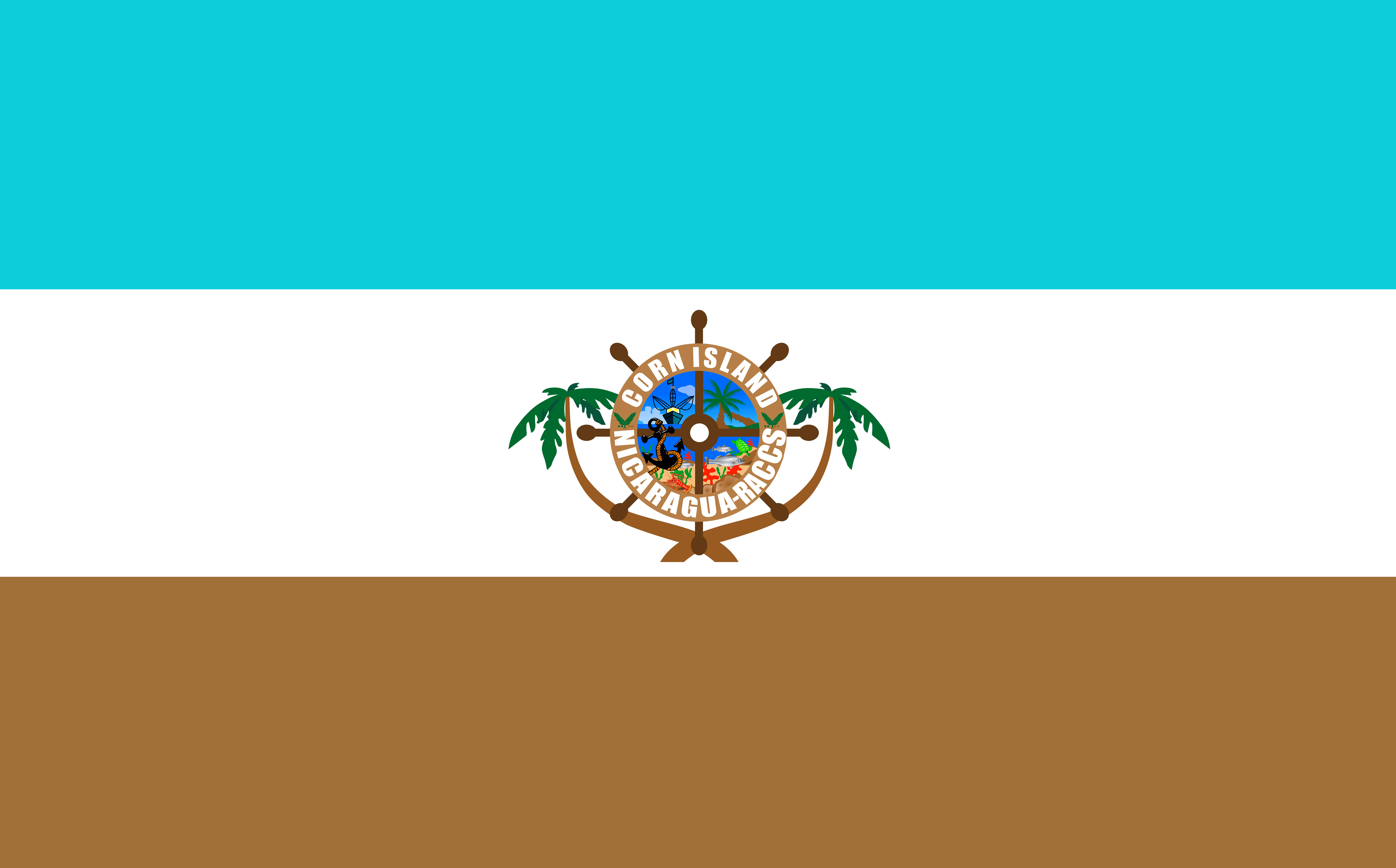
Corn Islands

Diriamba

Estelí

Granada

Jinotega

Jinotepe

Juigalpa

León

Managua

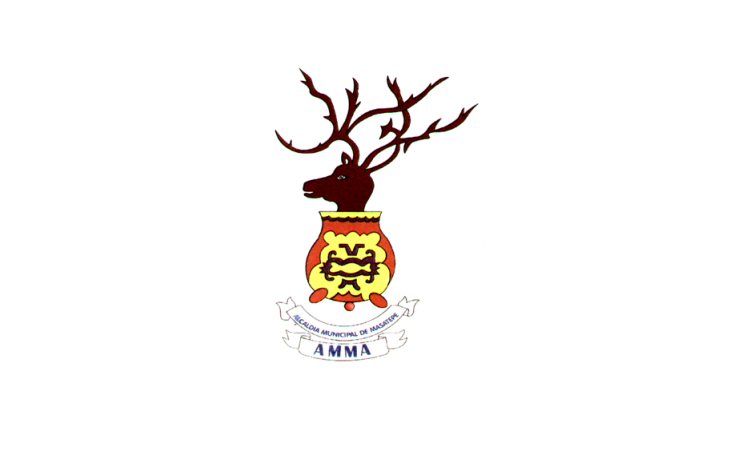
Masatepe

Masaya

Matagalpa

Puerto Cabezas

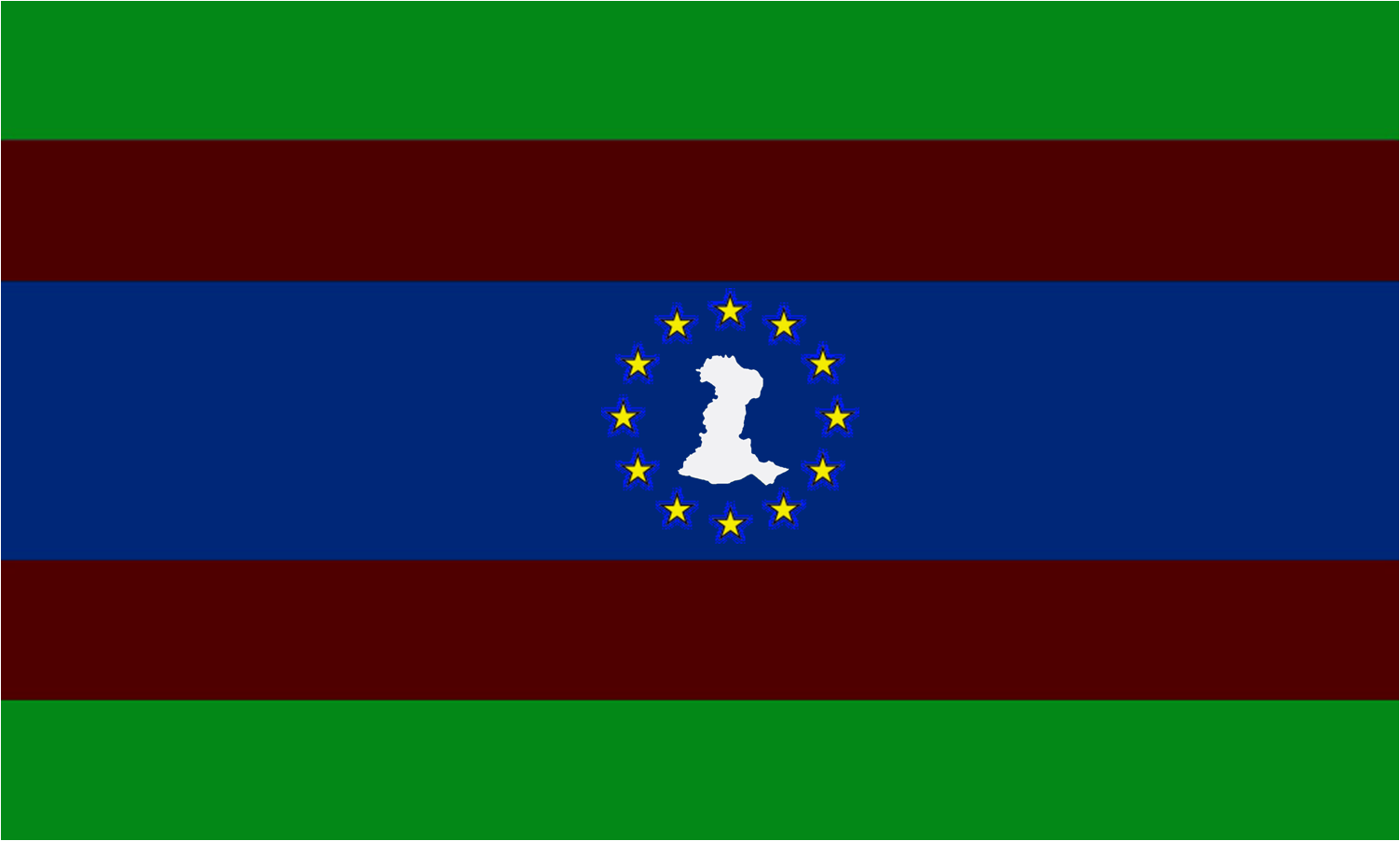
Sébaco

Somoto

== Panama ==
Aguadulce

Chitré

Colón

David

La Chorrera

La Villa de los Santos

Panama City

San Miguelito

== Saint Lucia ==
Castries

== Saint Pierre and Miquelon ==
Miquelon-Langlade

Saint-Pierre

== Trinidad and Tobago ==
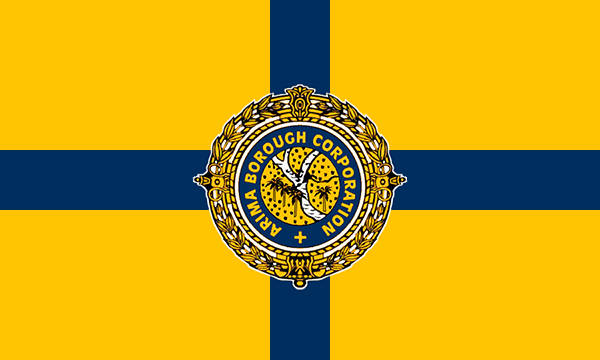
Arima

== United States ==
Aberdeen

Agawam

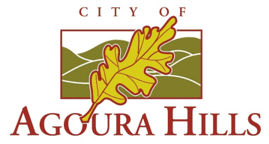
Agoura Hills

Alameda

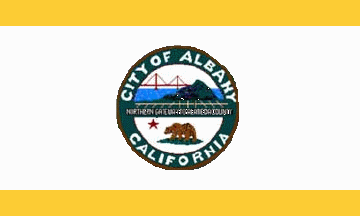
Albany, California

Albany, New York

Albany, Oregon

Albuquerque

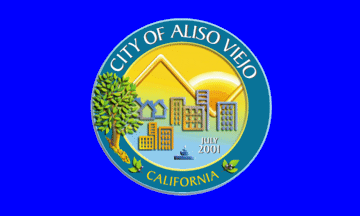
Aliso Viejo

American Fork

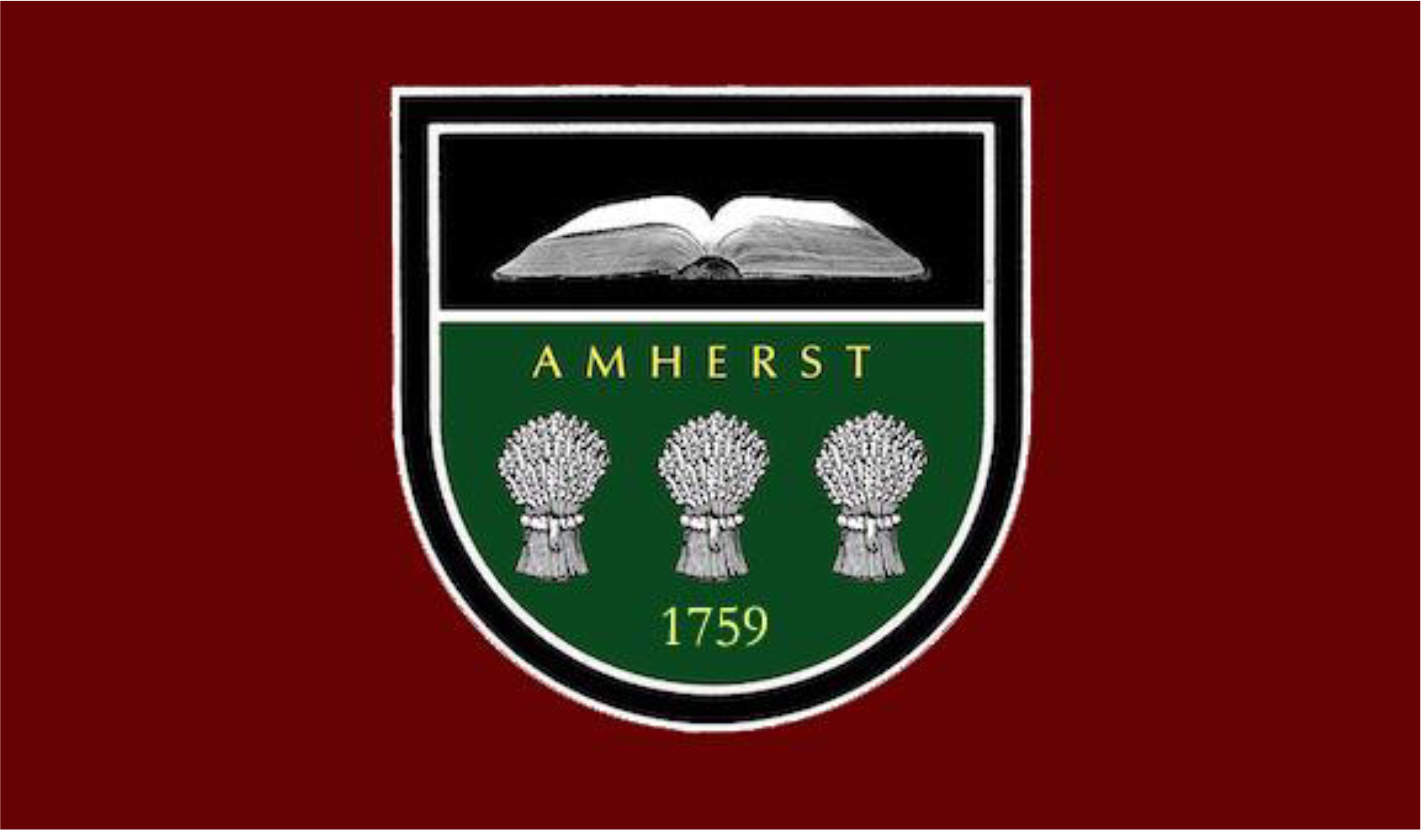
Amherst

Anaheim

Anapolis

Anchorage

Anthony

Apopka

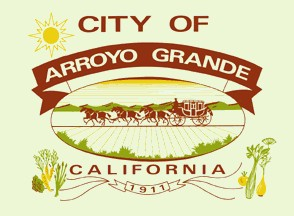
Arroyo Grande

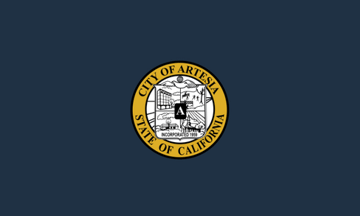
Artesia

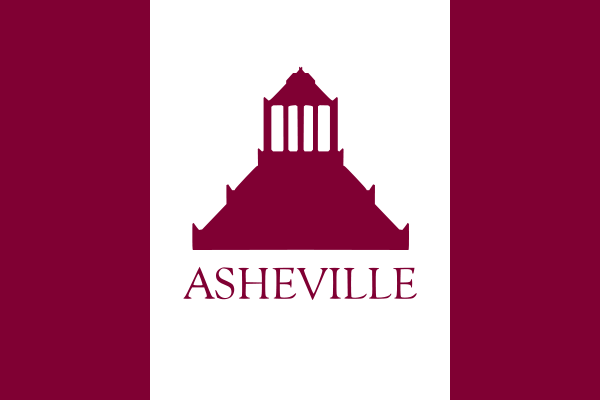
Asheville

Ashland

Atlanta

Atlantic City

Augusta

Austin

Avondale

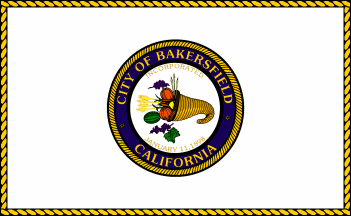
Bakersfield

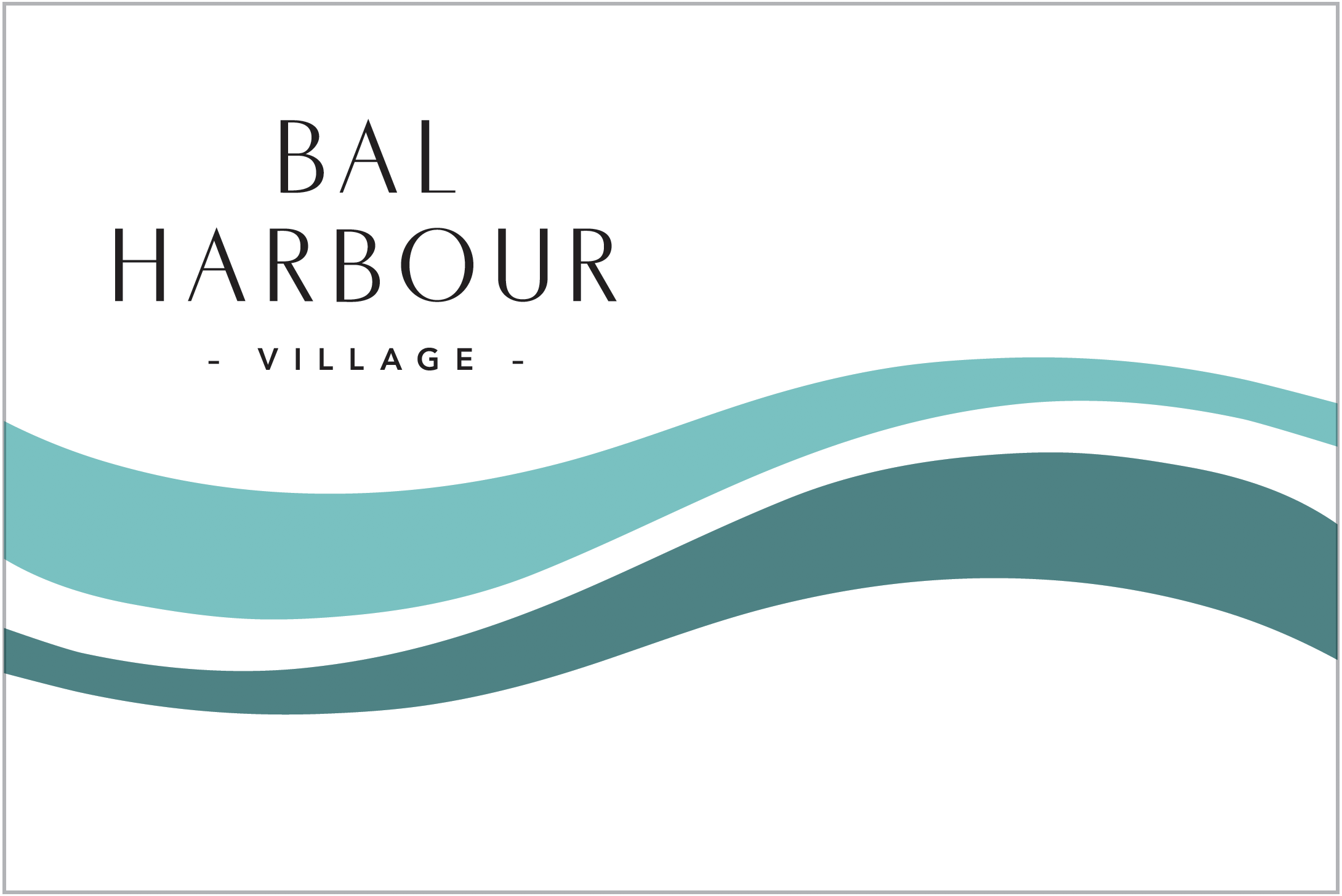
Bal Harbour

Baldwin City

Baltimore

Bath

Baton Rouge

Bayamón

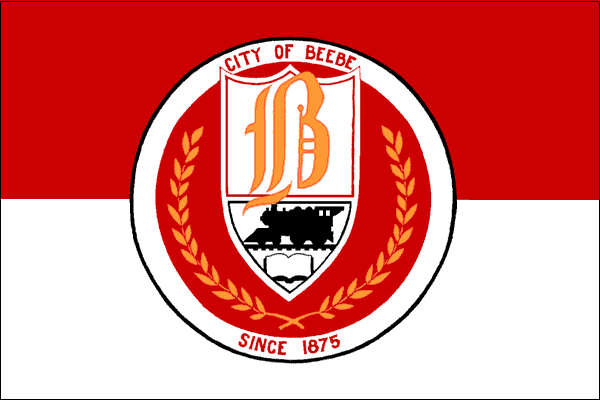
Beebe

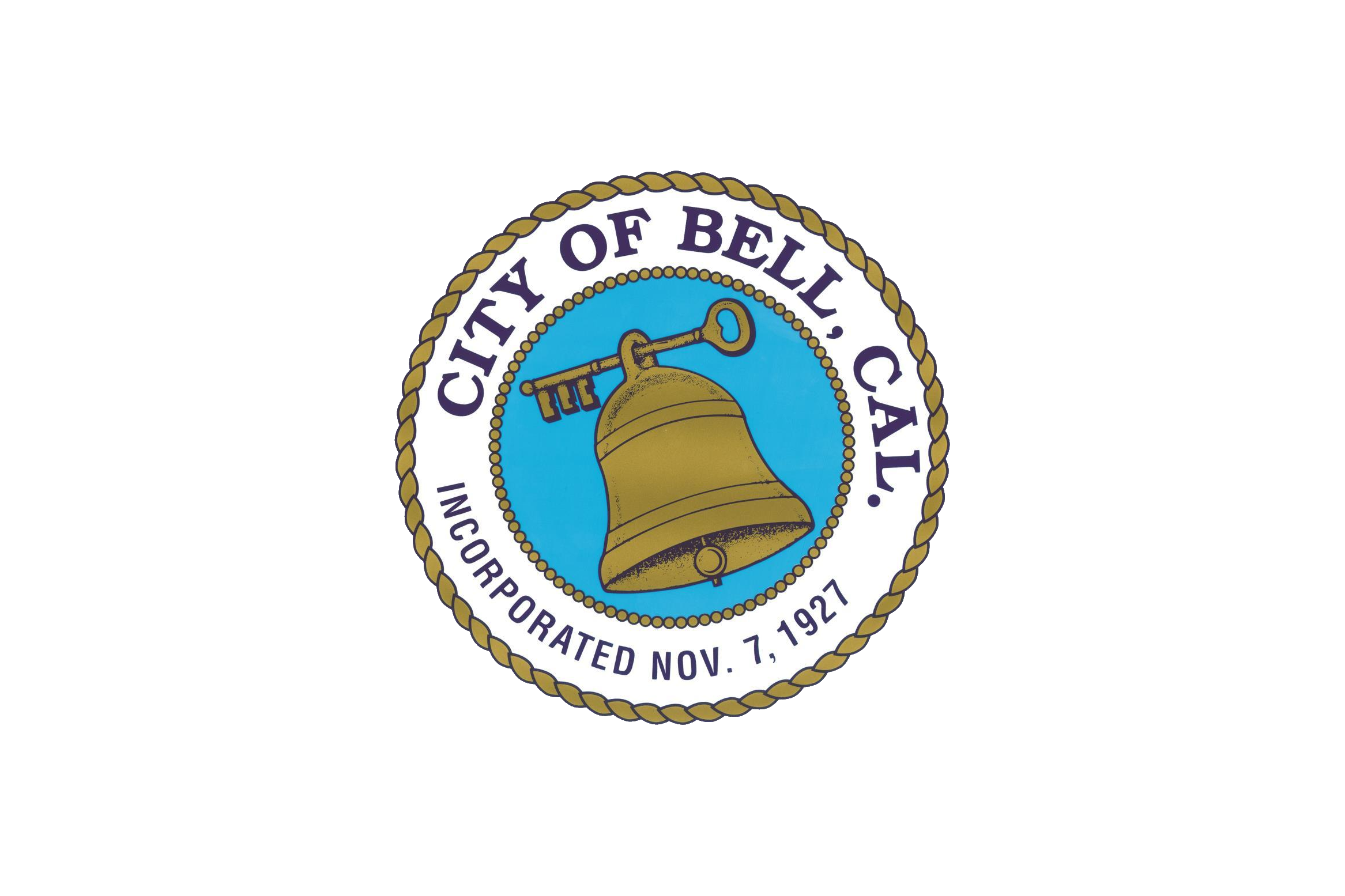
Bell

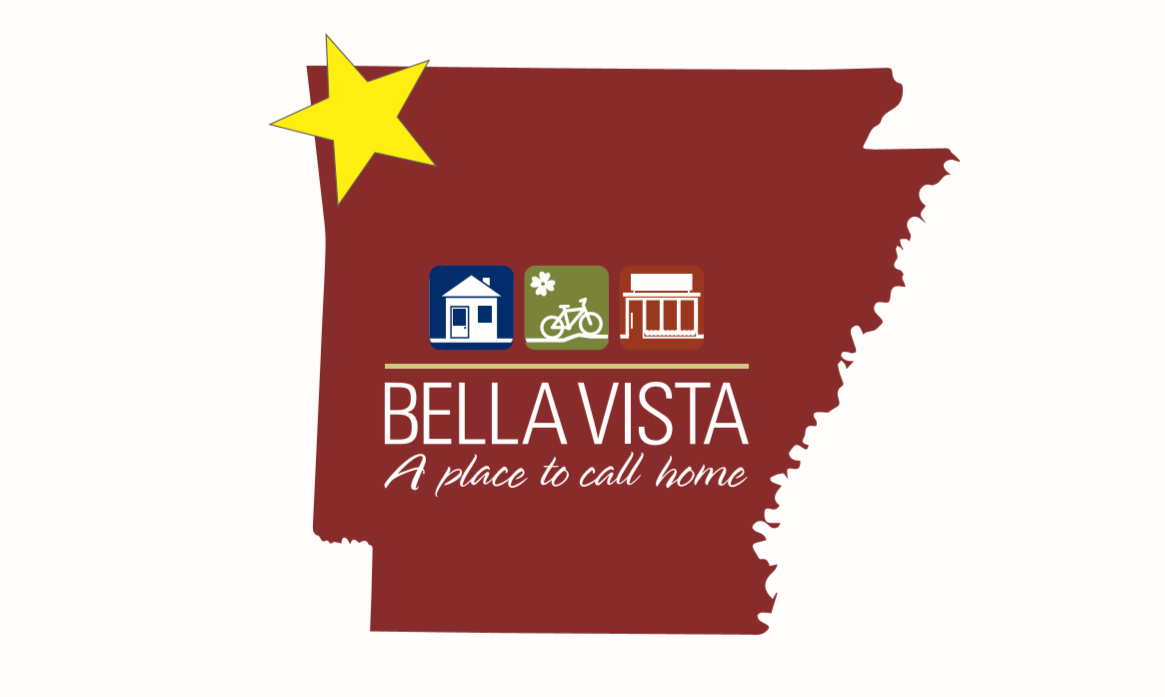
Bella Vista

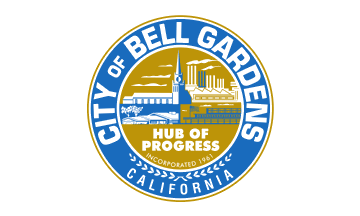
Bell Gardens

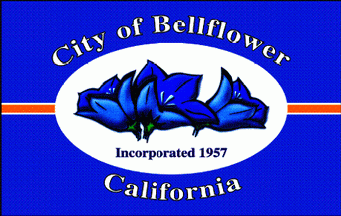
Bellflower

Bellingham

Beloit

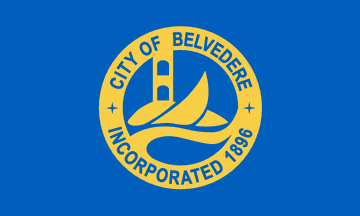
Belvedere

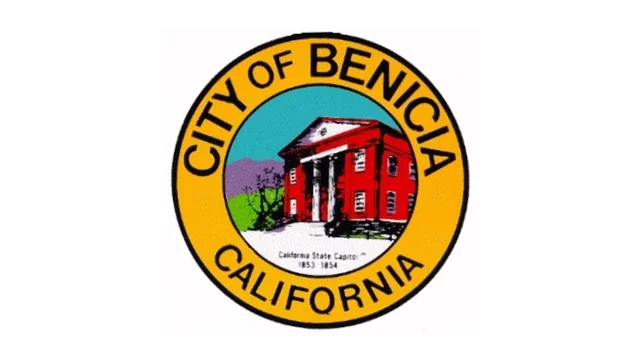
Benicia

Benson

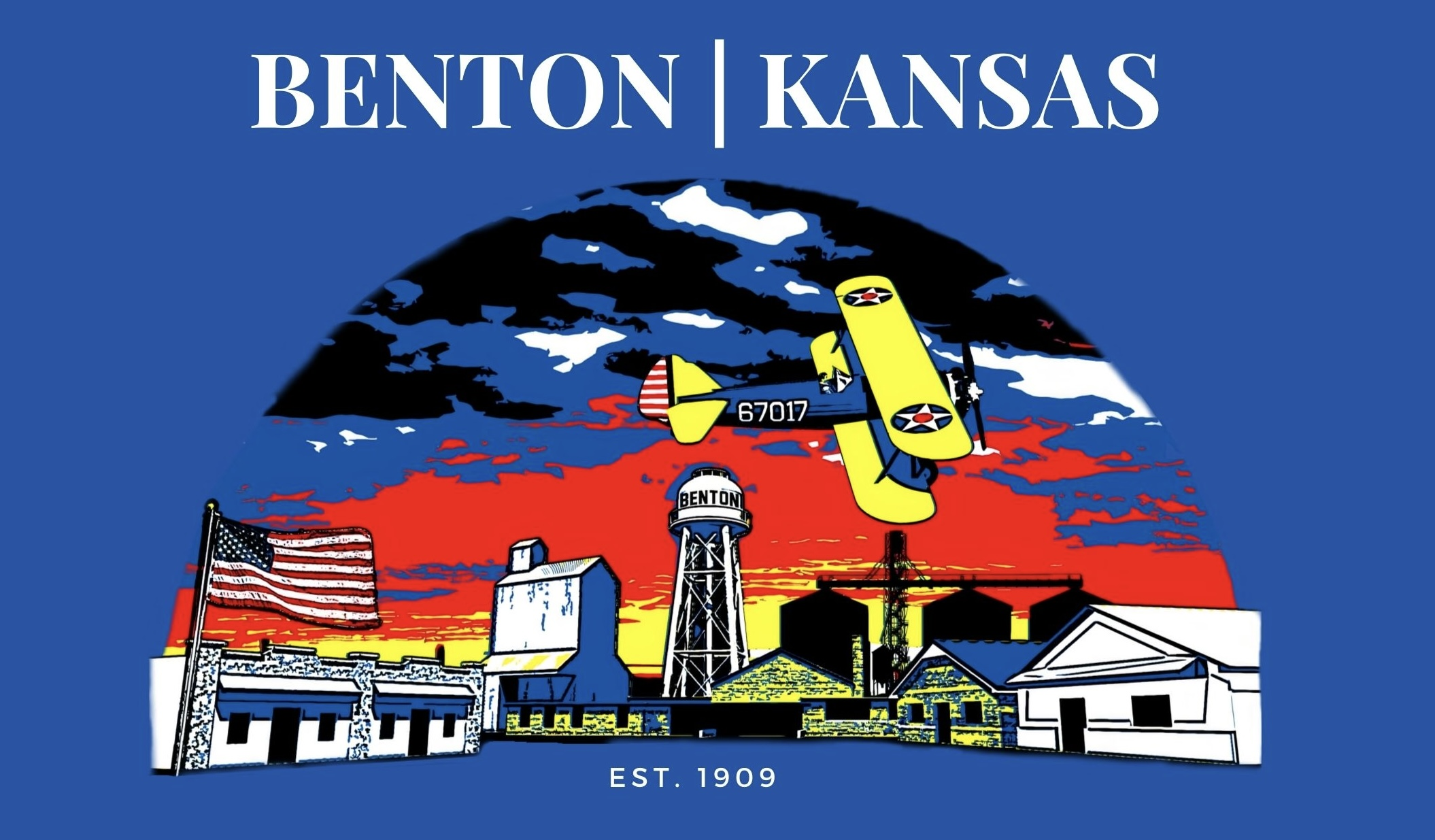
Benton

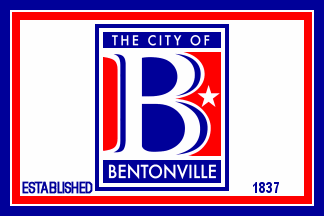
Benton City

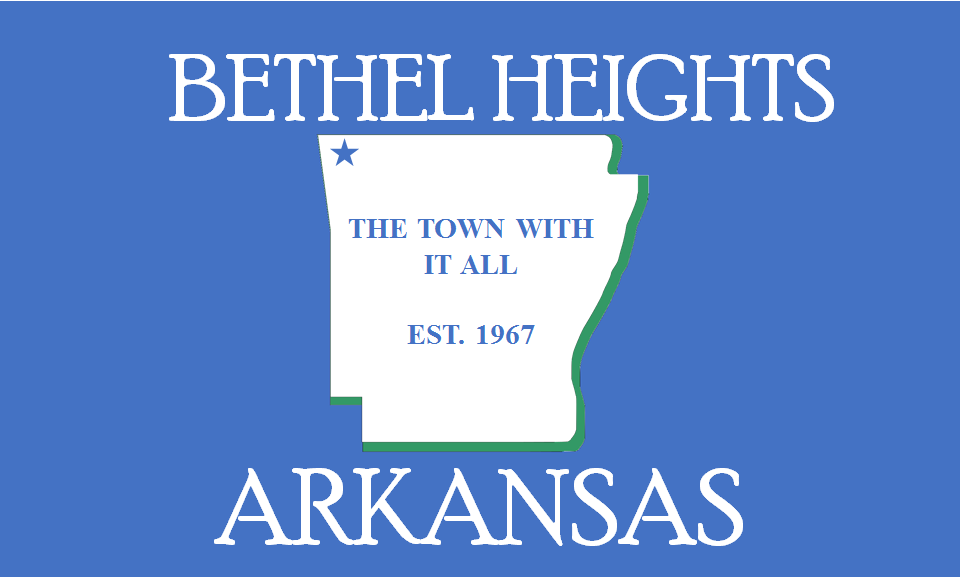
Bethel Heights

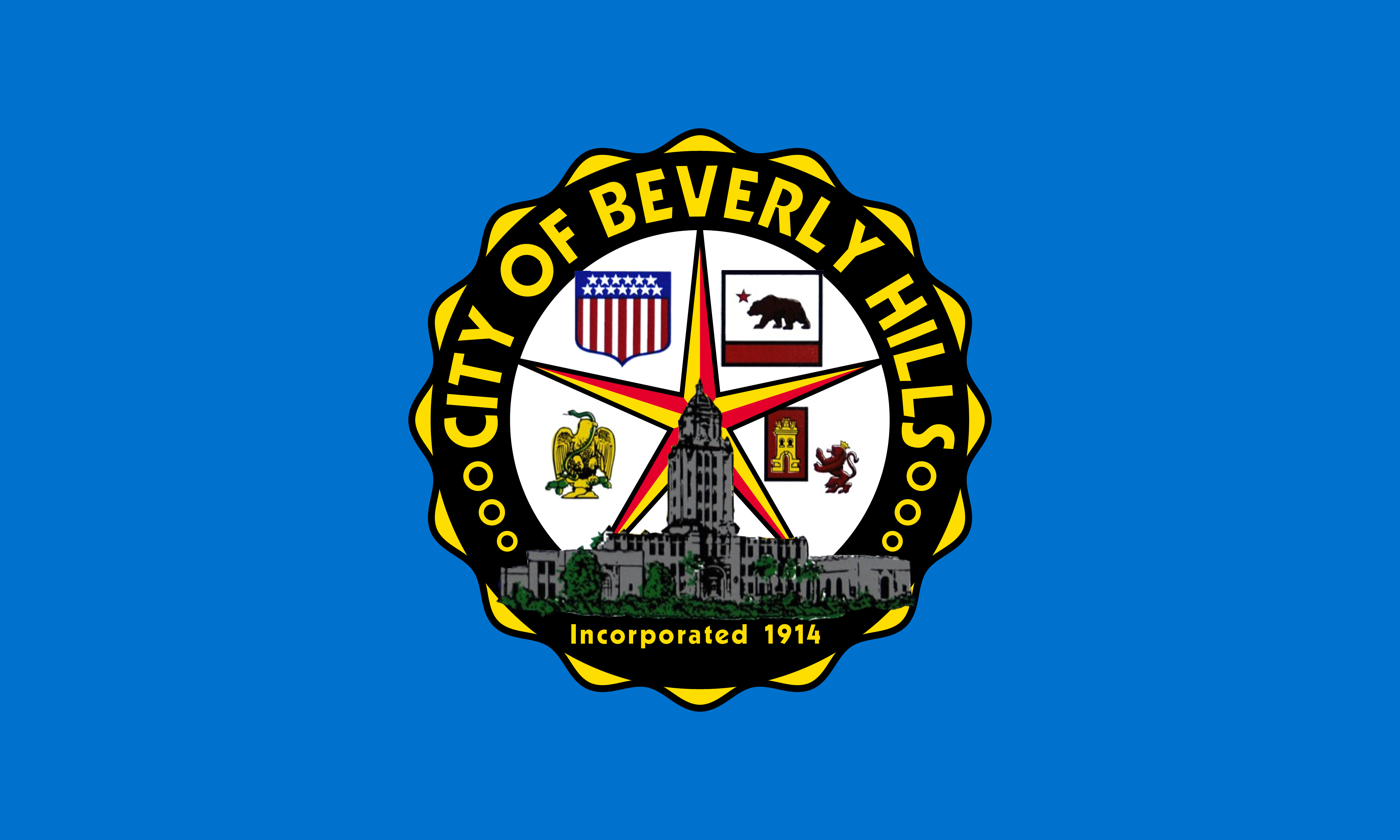
Beverly Hills

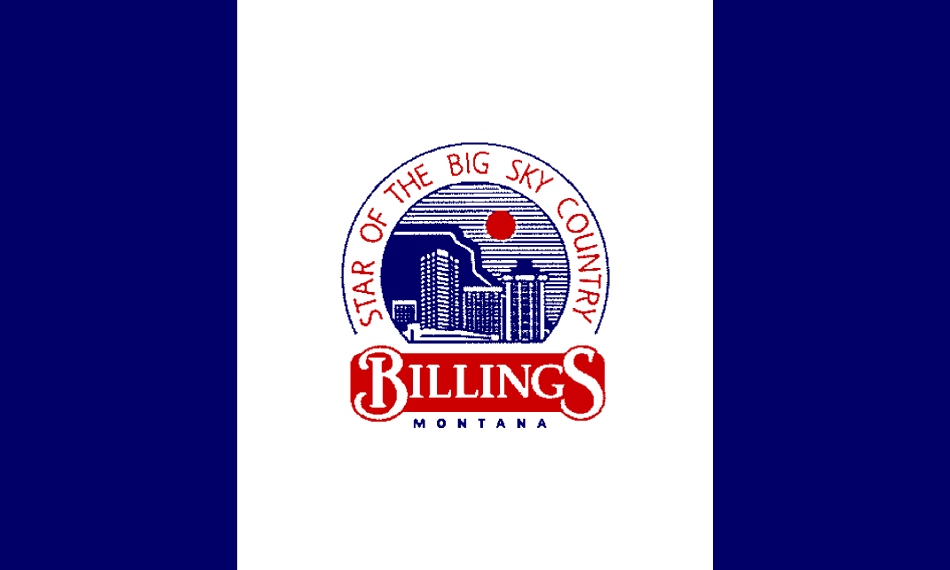
Billings

Birmingham

Bisbee

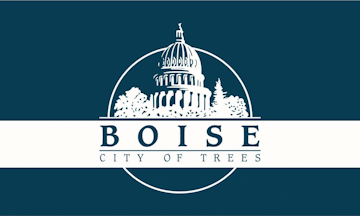
Boise

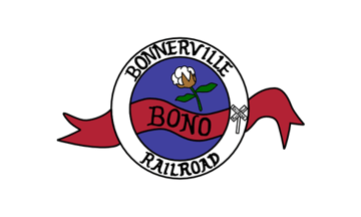
Bono

Boston

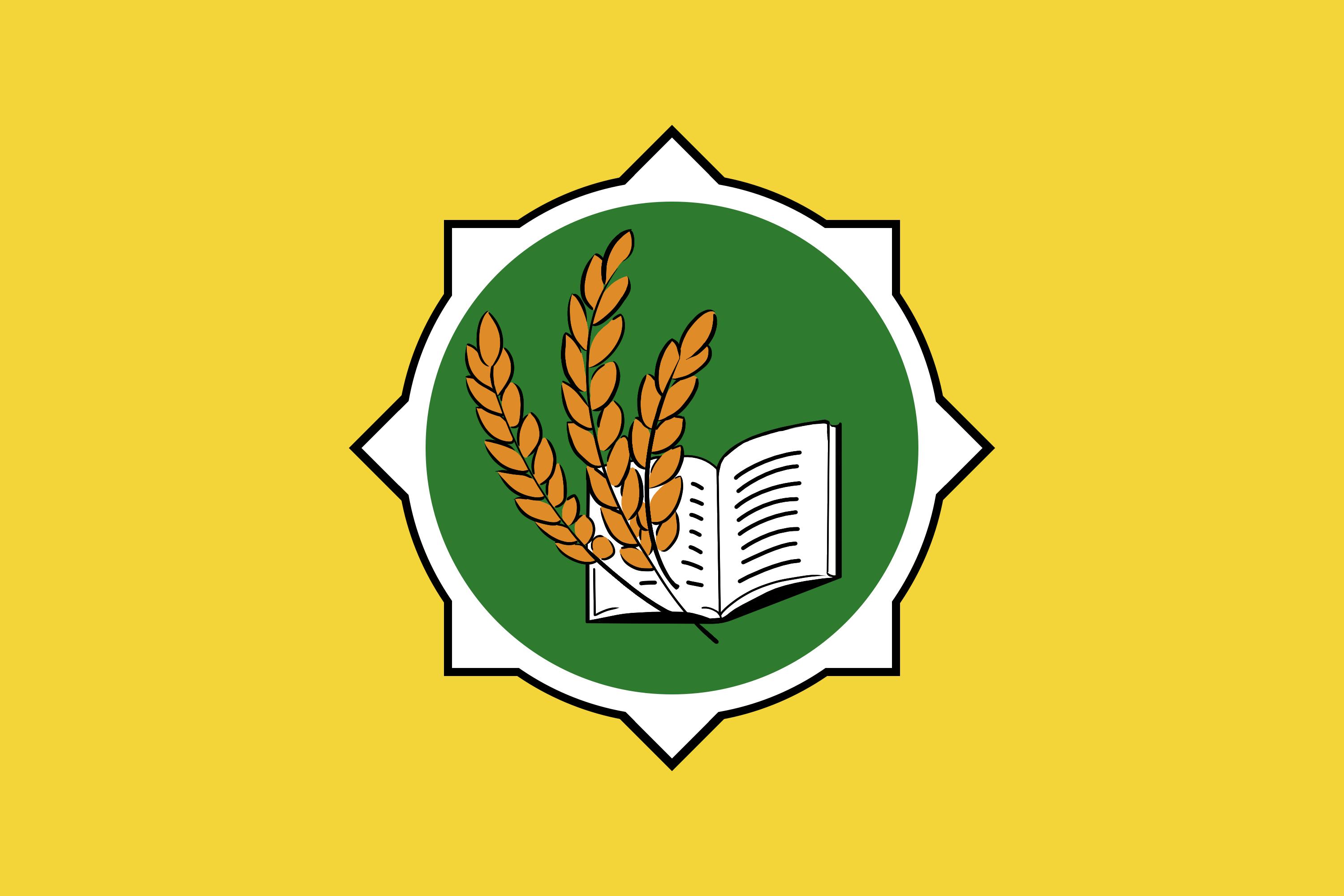
Bozeman

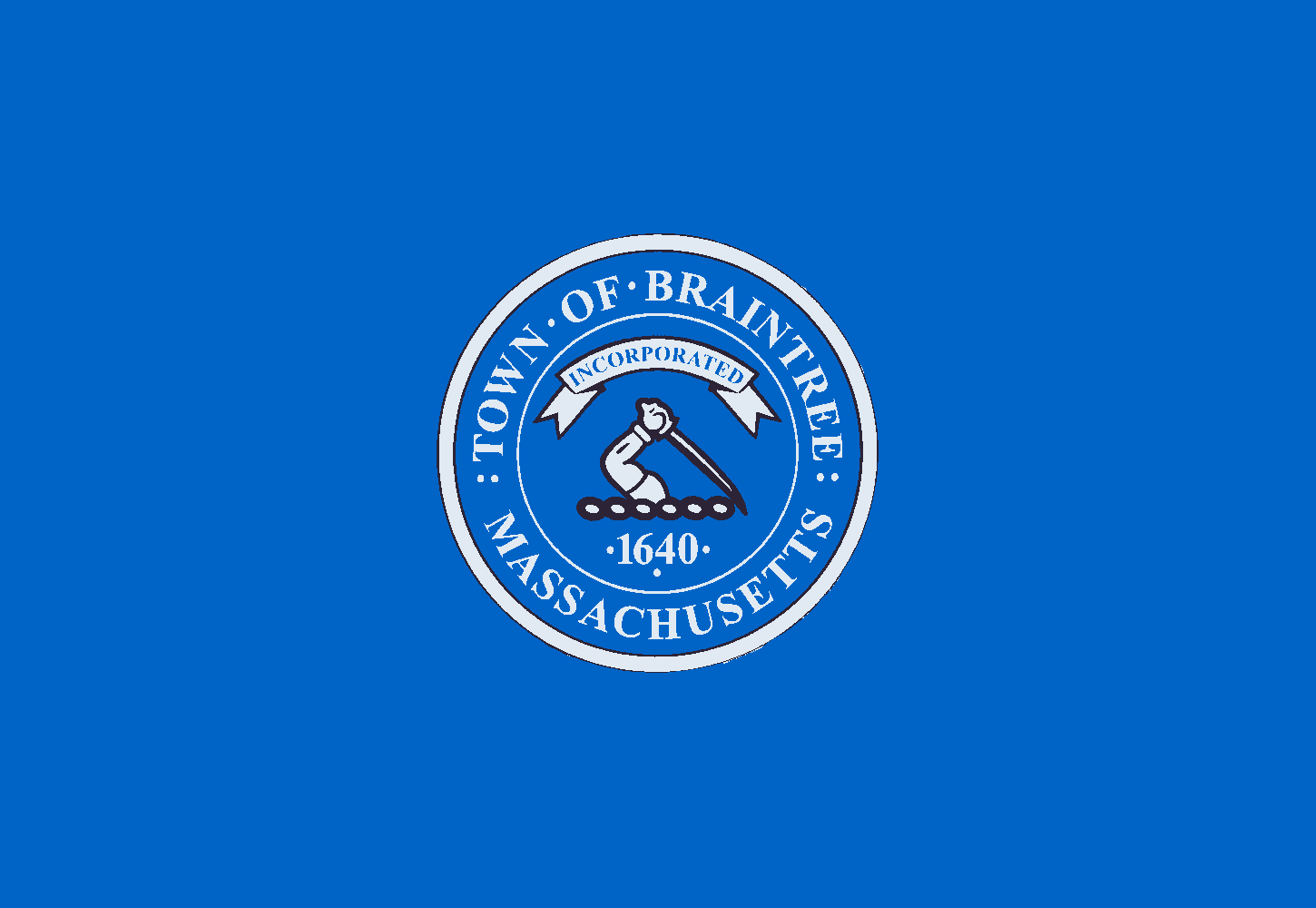
Braintree

Brandon

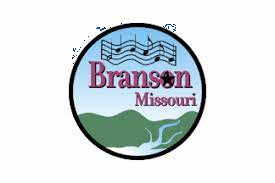
Branson

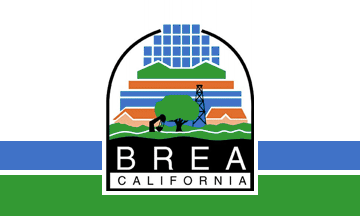
Brea

Bridgewater

Buckeye

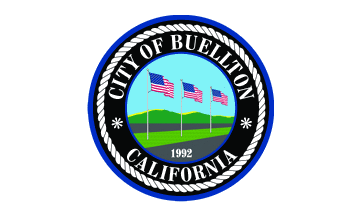
Buellton

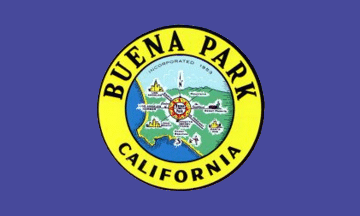
Buena Park

Buffalo

Burlington

Butte

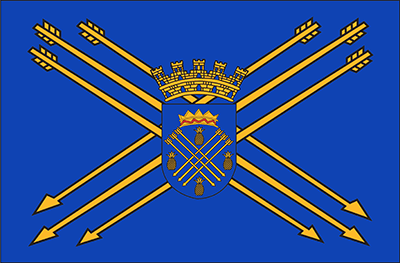
Caguas

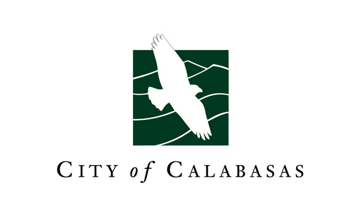
Calabasas

Caldwell

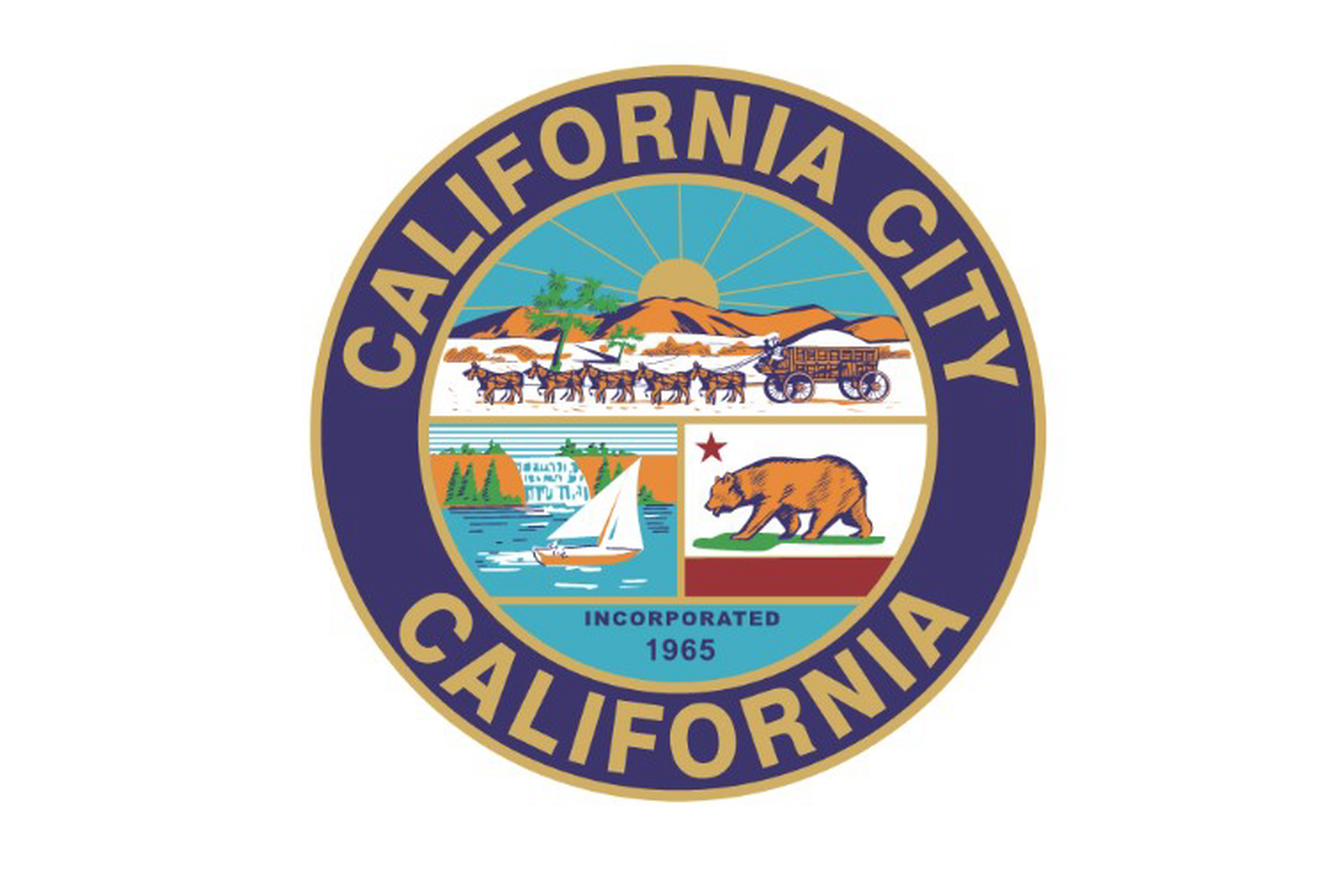
California City

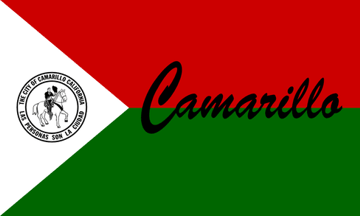
Camarillo

Cambridge

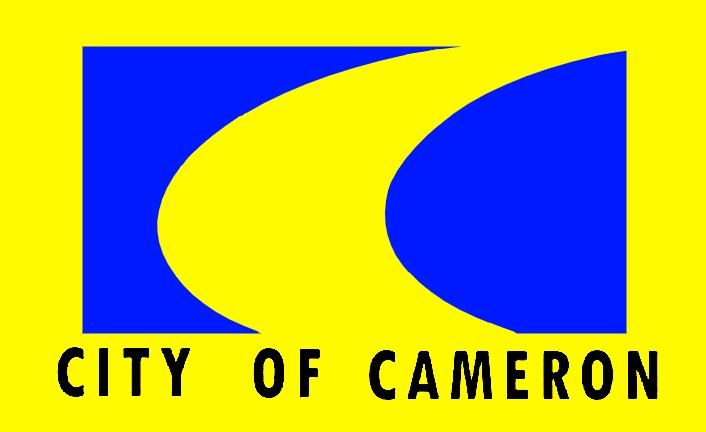
Cameron

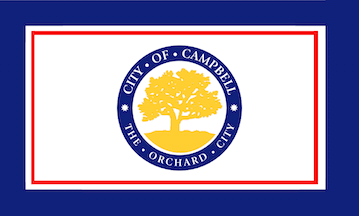
Campbell

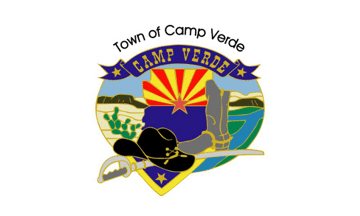
Camp Verde

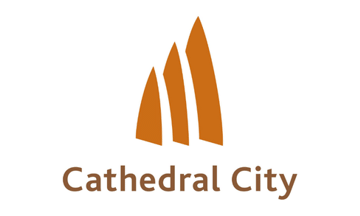
Cathedral City

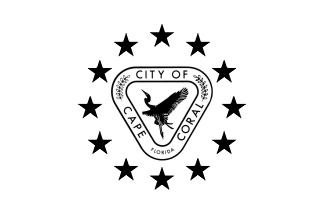
Cape Coral

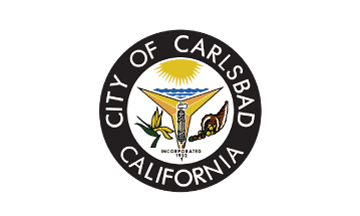
Carlsbad

Carolina

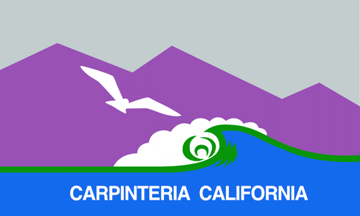
Carpinteria

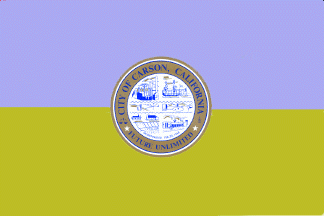
Carson

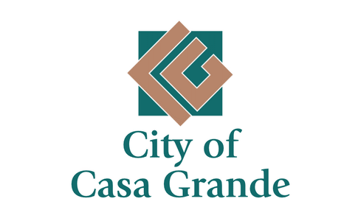
Casa Grande

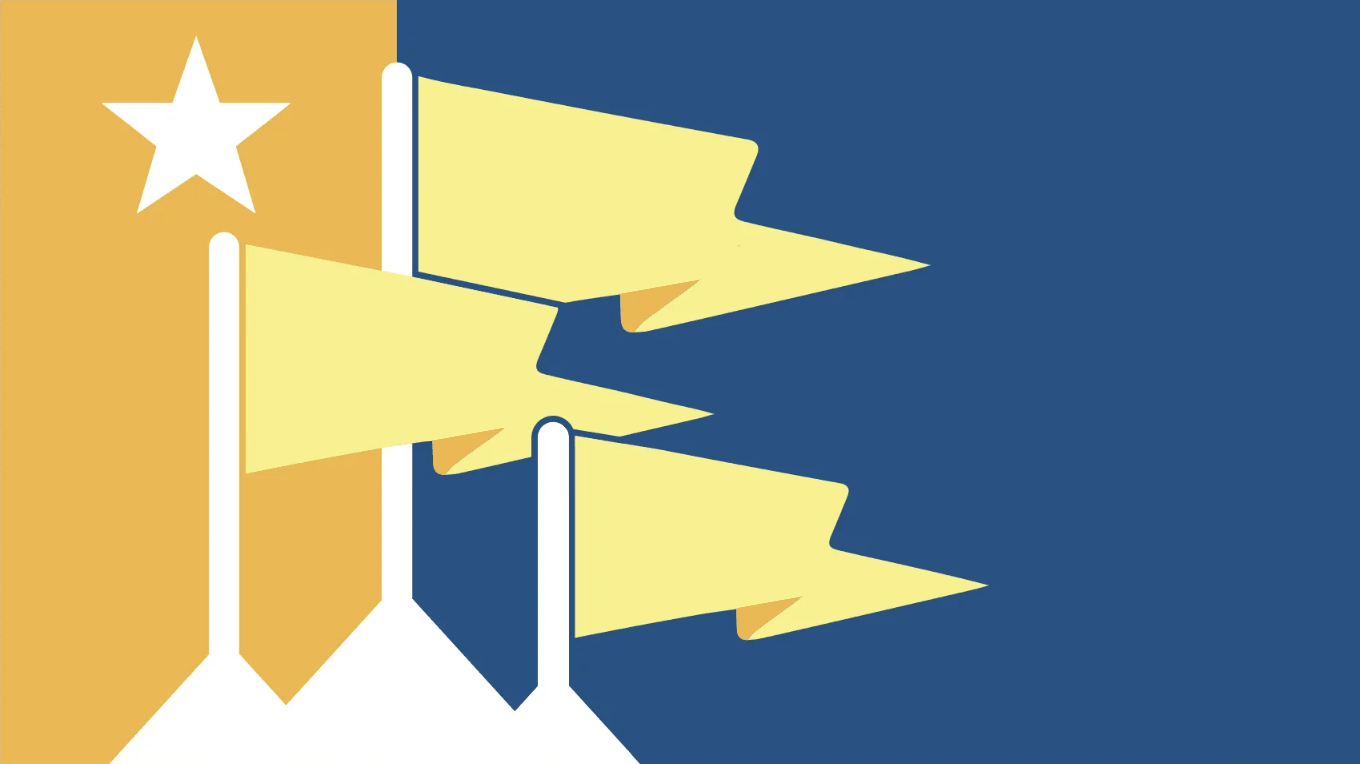
Cedar City

Cedar Rapids

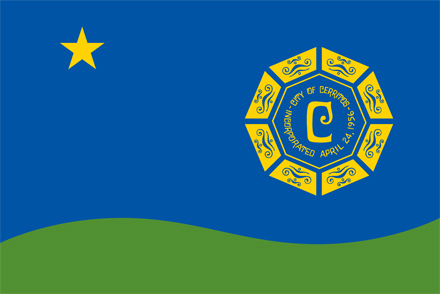
Cerritos

Chandler

Charleston

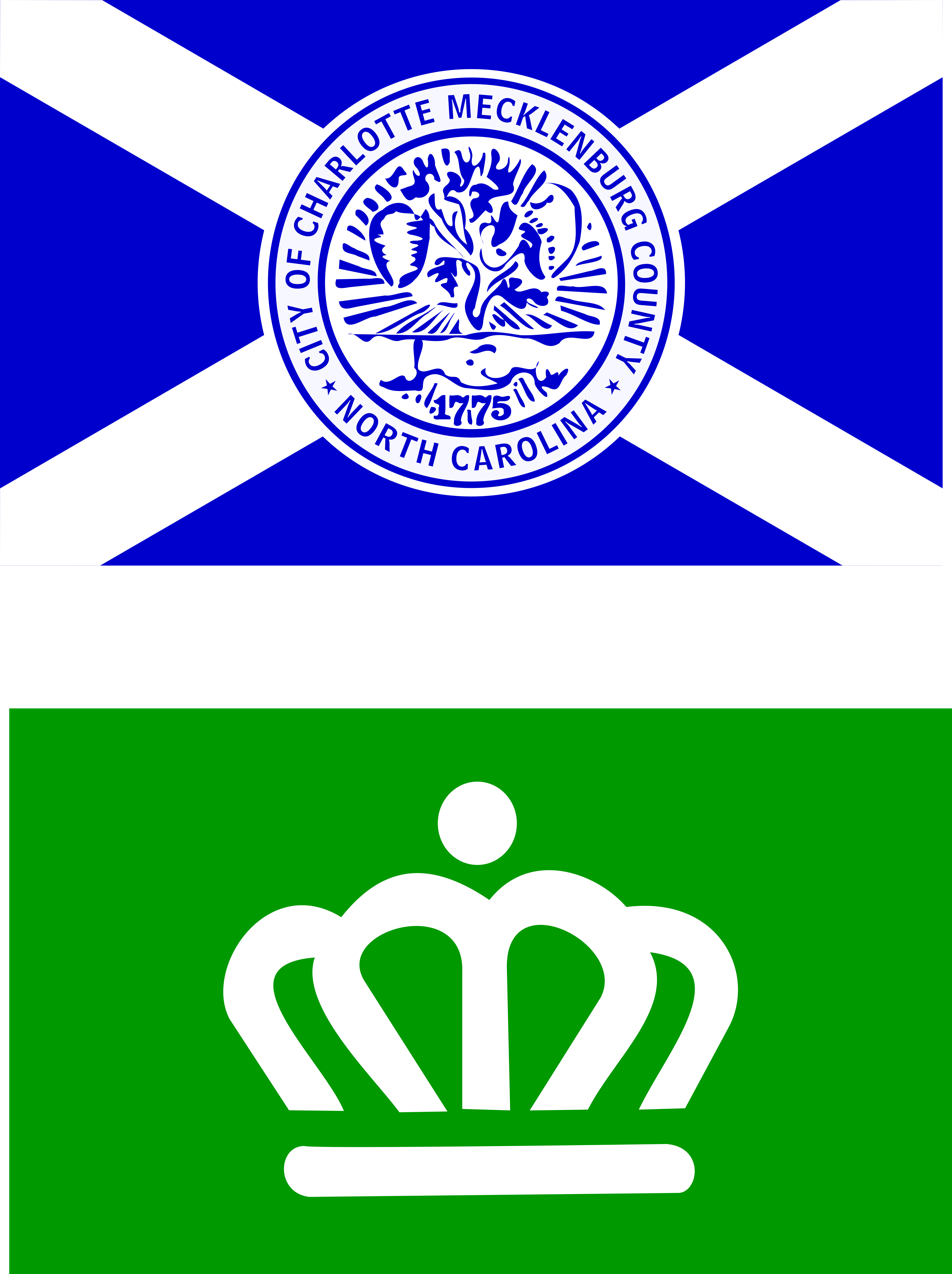
Charlotte

Chicago

Chicopee

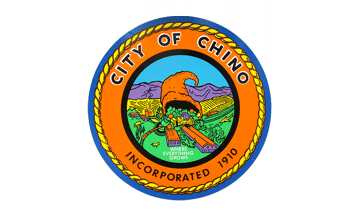
Chino

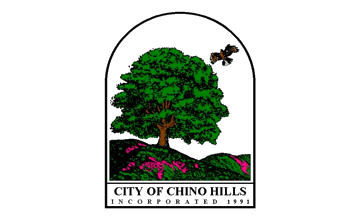
Chino Hills

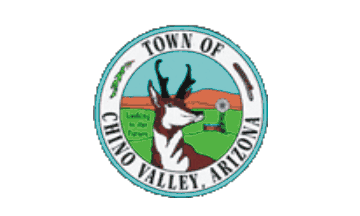
Chino Valley

Chula Vista

Cimarron

Cincinnati

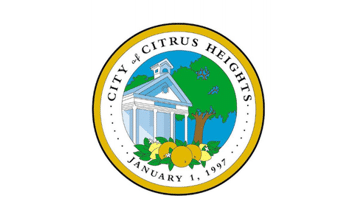
Citrus Heights

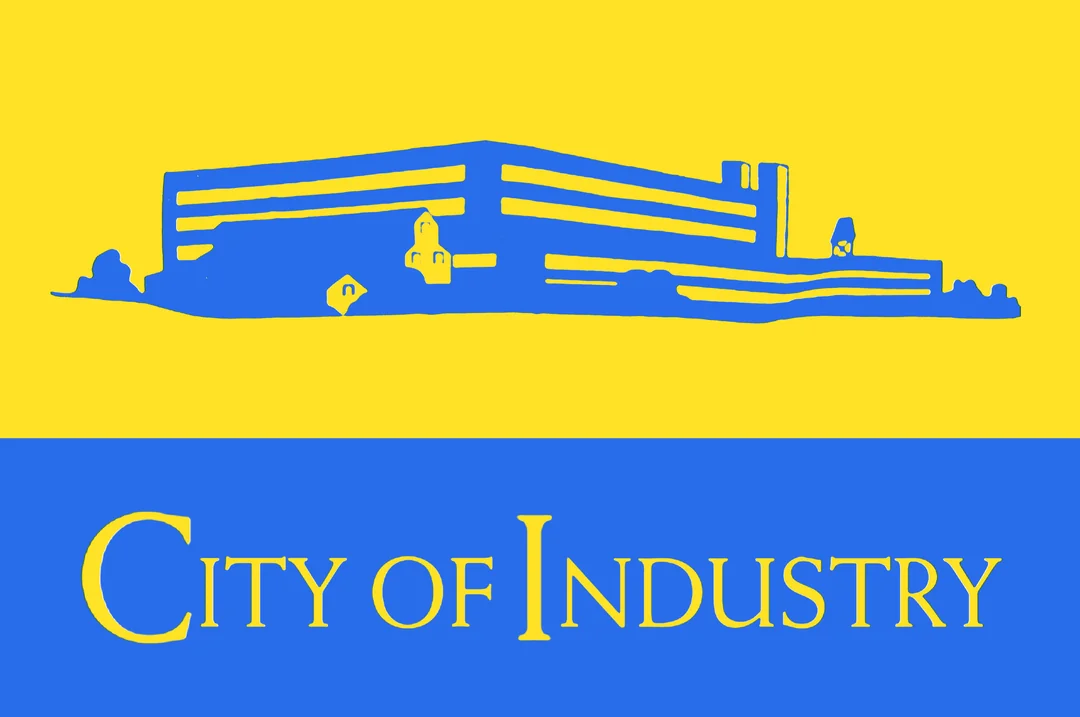
City of Industry

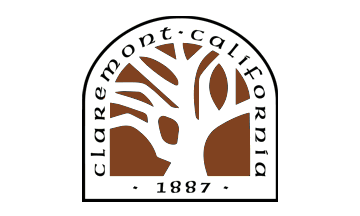
Claremont

Clarkdale

Claypool

Cleveland

Clifton

Clinton, Iowa

Clinton, South Carolina

Cocoa Beach

Coconut Creek

Colfax

Colorado Springs

Columbia, Missouri

Columbia, South Carolina

Columbus

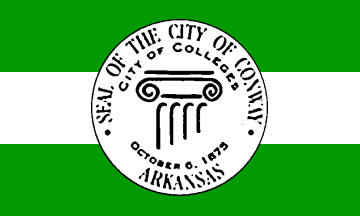
Conway

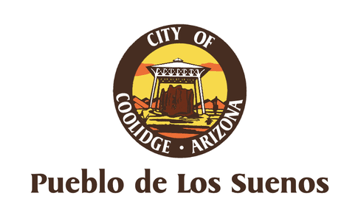
Coolidge

Cooper City

Coral Springs

Coronado

Corpus Christi

Costa Mesa

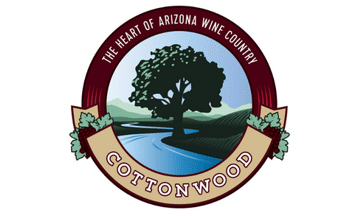
Cottonwood

Crestwood

Creve Coeur

Crystal

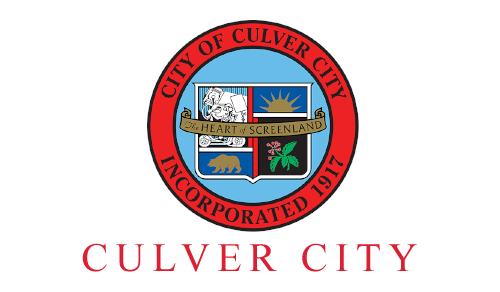
Culver City

Cupertino

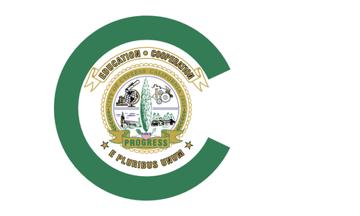
Cypress

Dallas

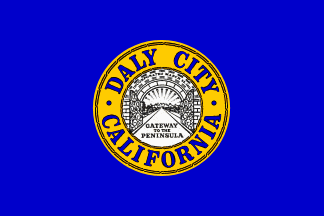
Daly City

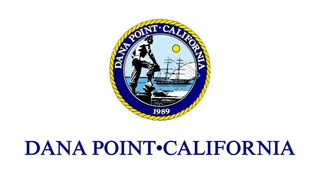
Dana Point

Dayton

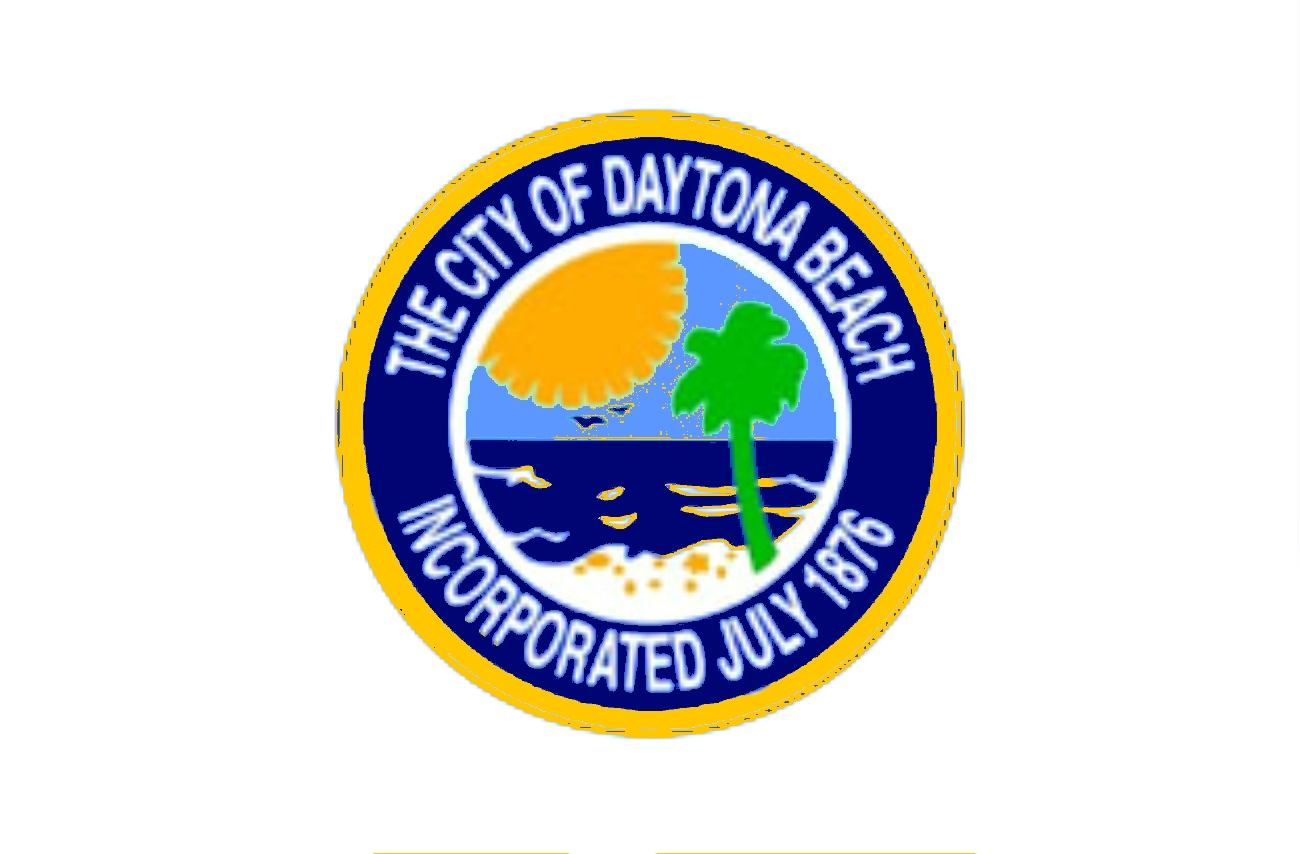
Daytona Beach

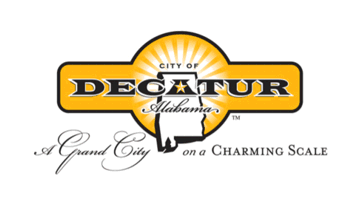
Decatur

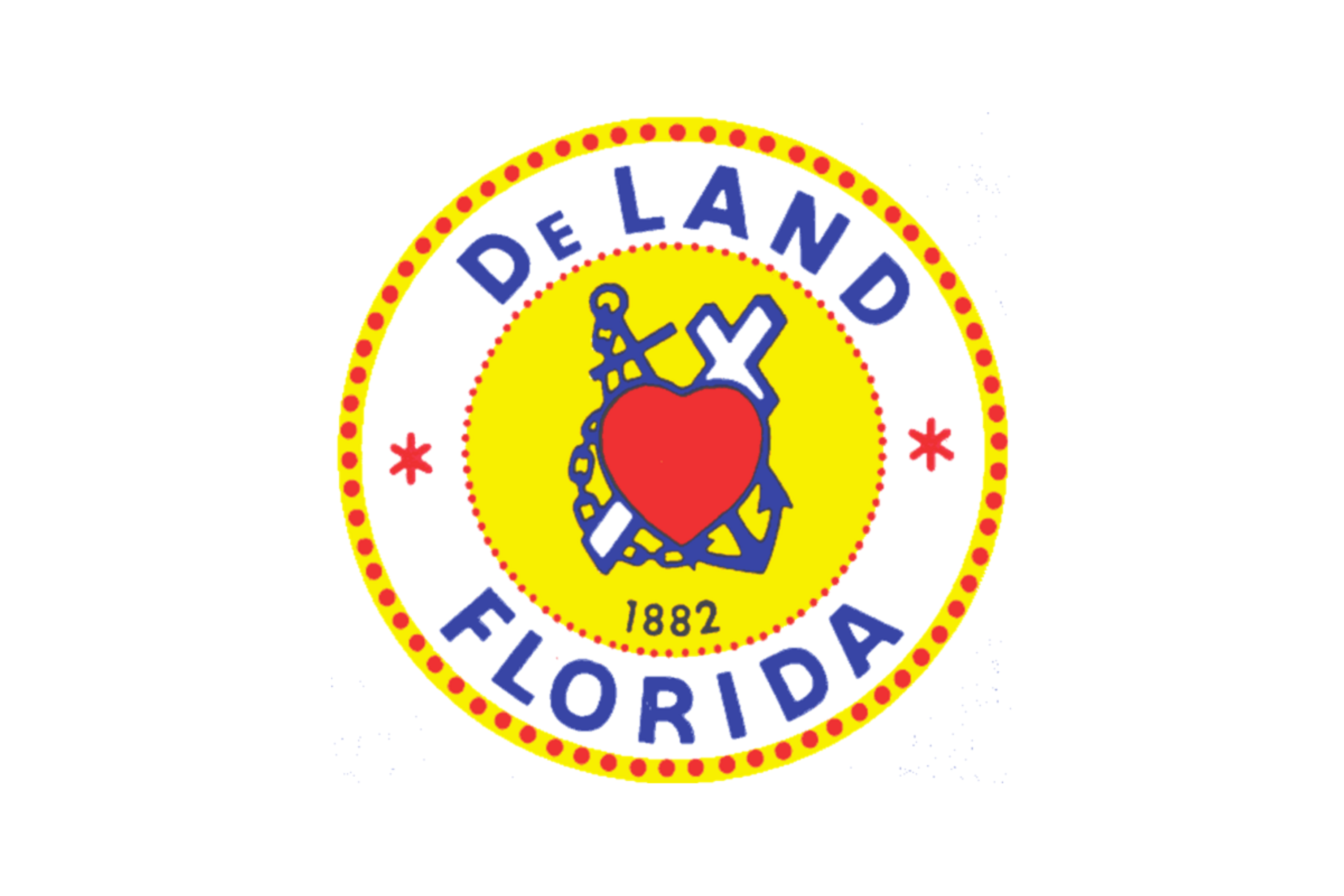
DeLand

Delray Beach

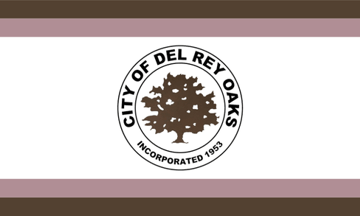
Del Rey Oaks

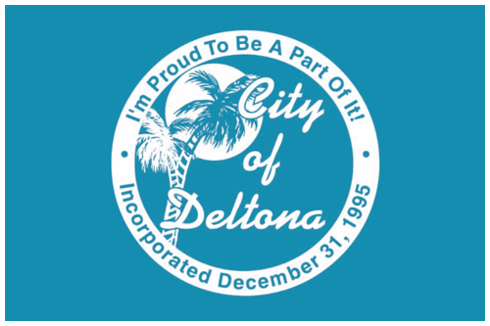
Deltona

Denison

Denver

Des Moines

Des Peres

Detroit

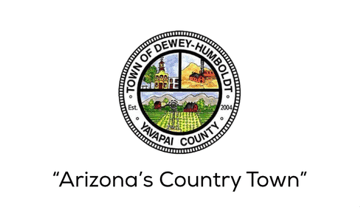
Dewey–Humboldt

Dodge City

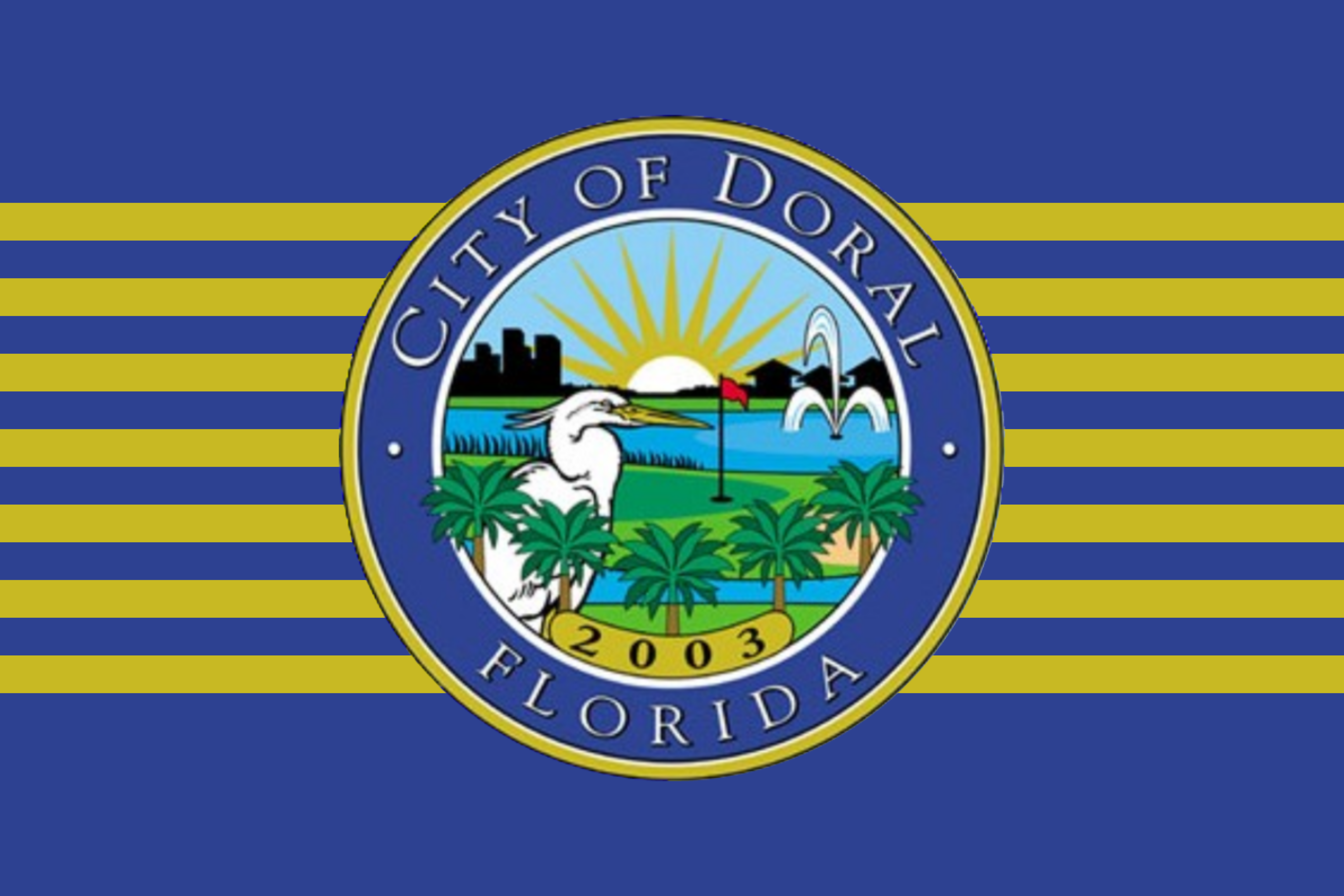
Doral

Dowagiac

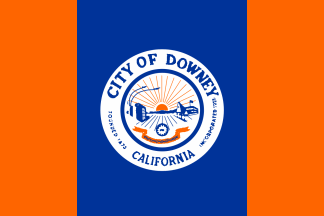
Downey

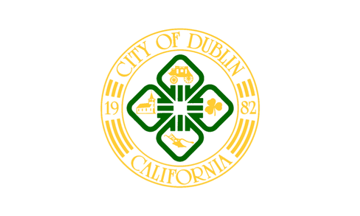
Dublin

Duluth

Duncan

Durham

Edgerton

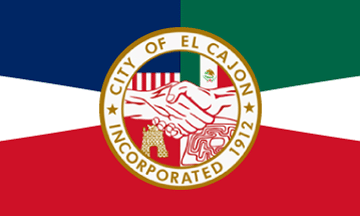
El Cajon

El Mirage

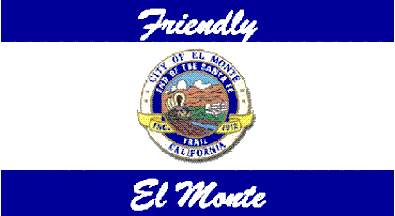
El Monte

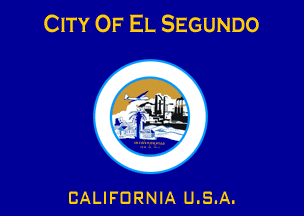
El Segundo

Elba

Elk Ridge

Elkhart

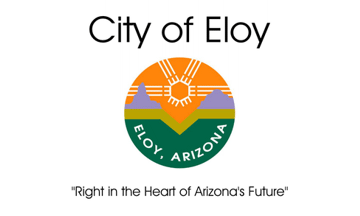
Eloy

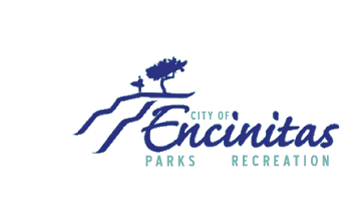
Encinitas

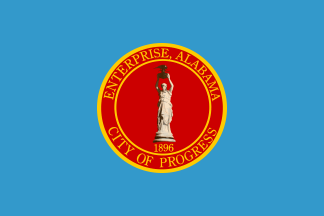
Enterprise

Ephraim

Escondido

Euclid

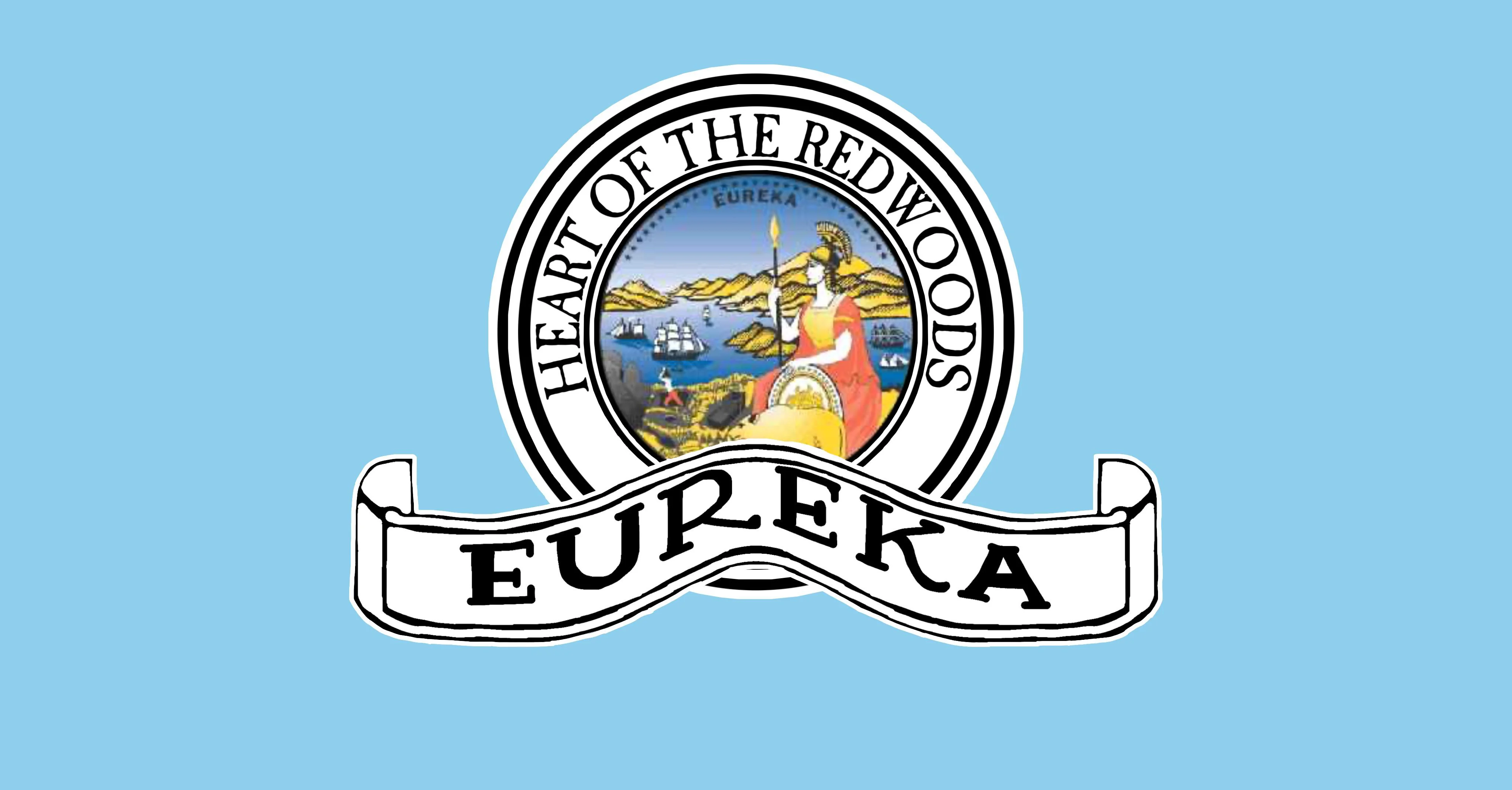
Eureka

Evanston

Everett

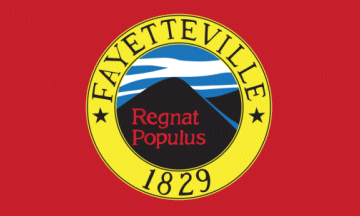
Fayetteville

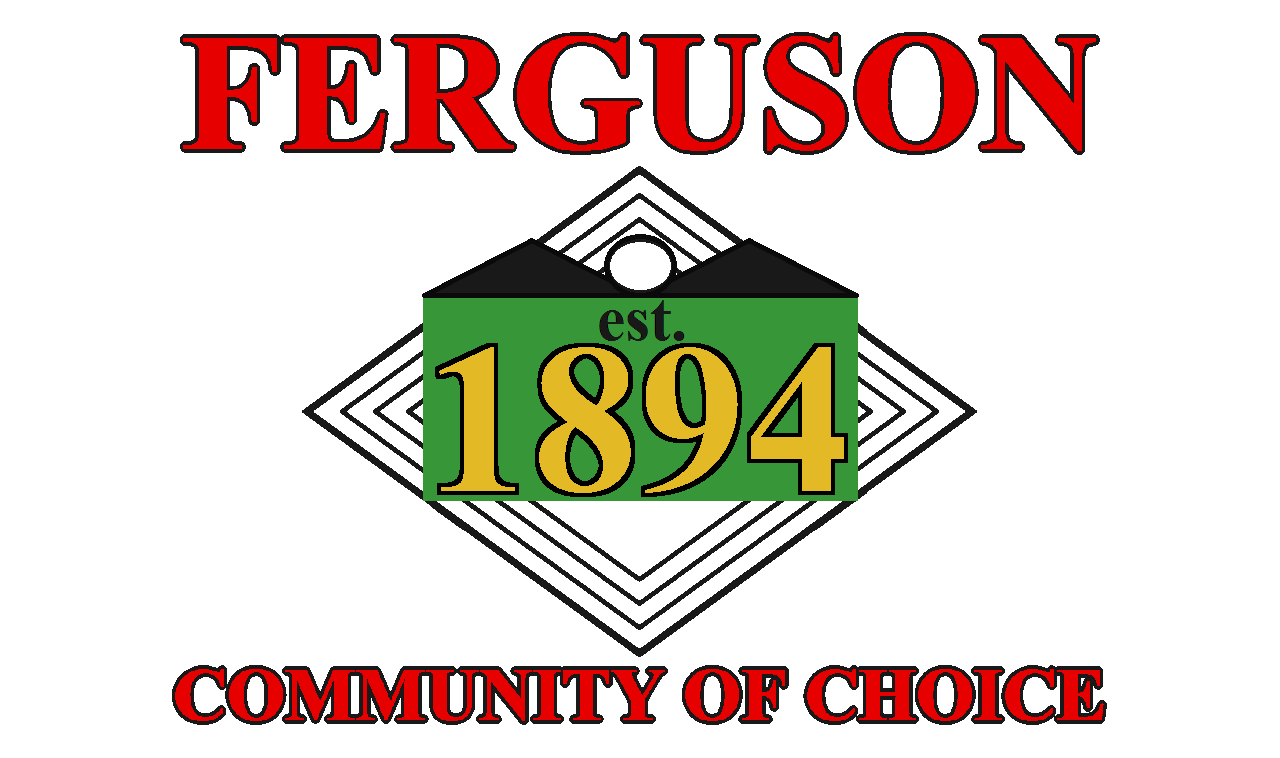
Ferguson

Flagstaff

Florence

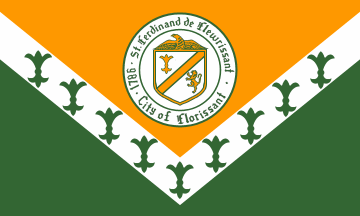
Florissant

Folsom

Fort Lauderdale

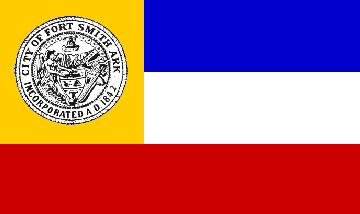
Fort Smith

Fort Wayne

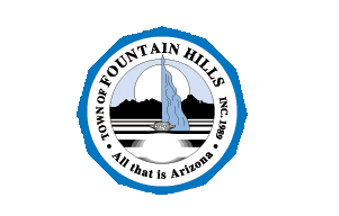
Fountain Hills

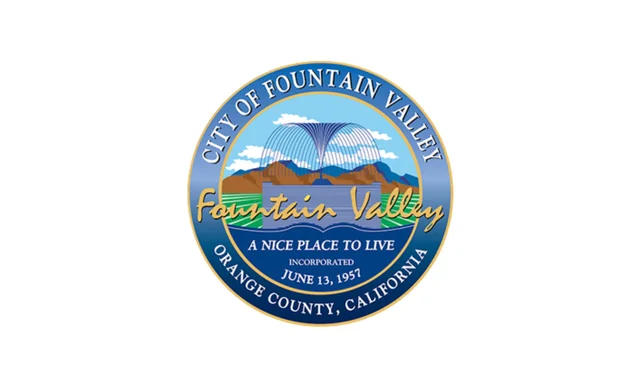
Fountain Valley

Frankfort

Fresno

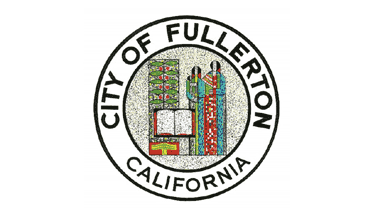
Fullerton

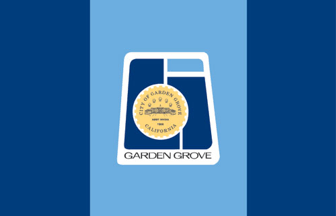
Garden Grove

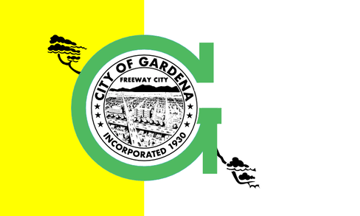
Gardena

Gardner

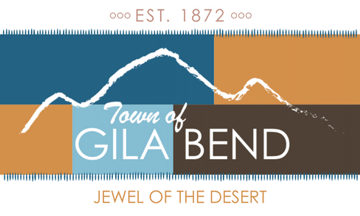
Gila Bend

Gilbert

Gilford

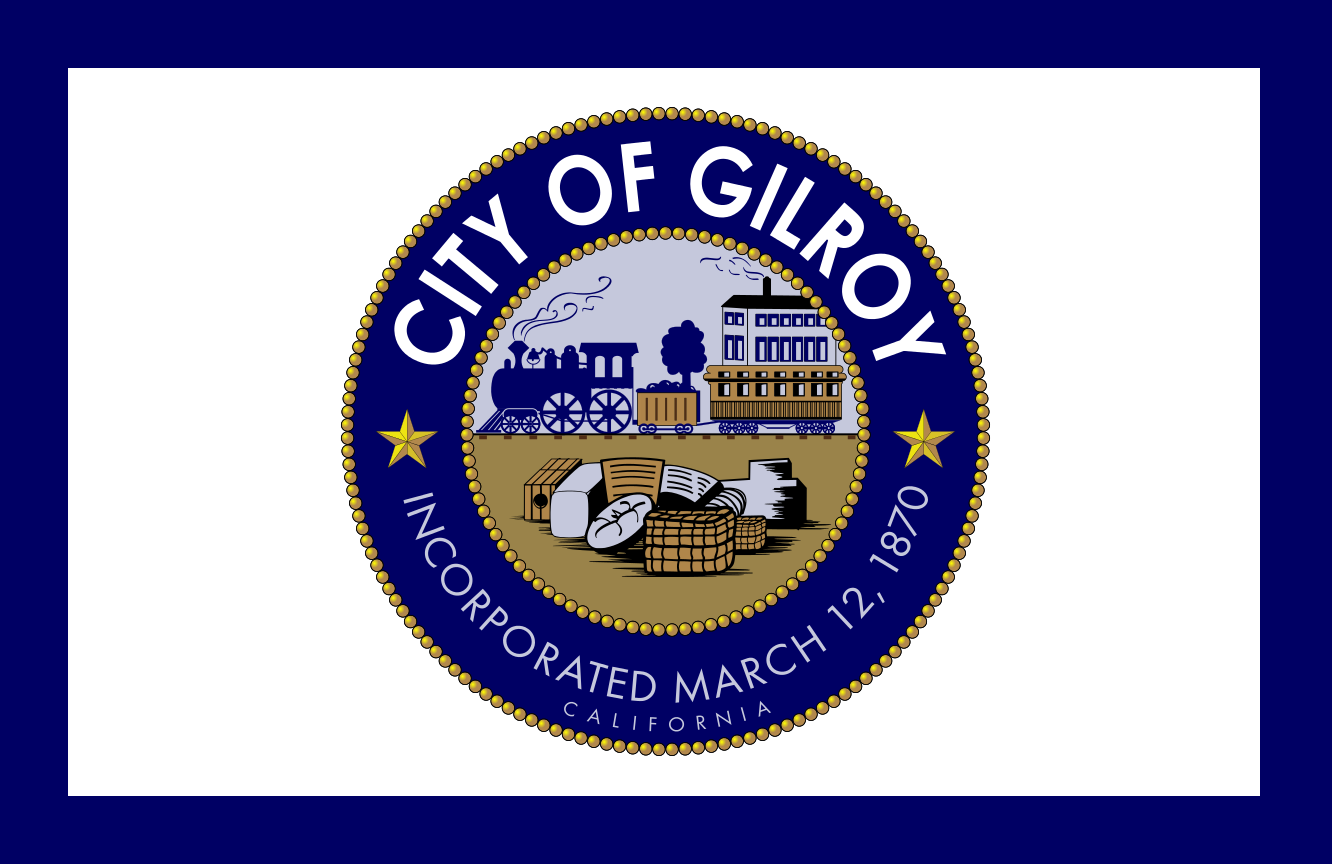
Gilroy

Glendale, Arizona

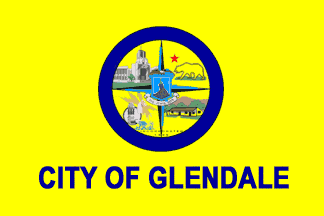
Glendale, California

Gold Canyon

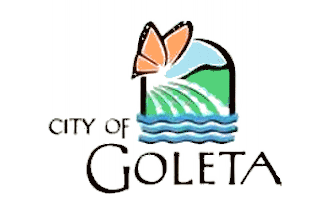
Goleta

Goodyear

Gordon

Grandview

Greenbelt

Greenfield

Green River

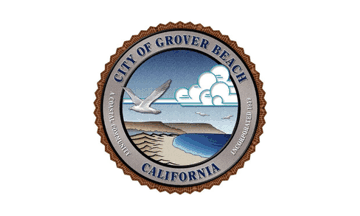
Grover Beach

Guadalupe

Hallandale Beach

Hartford

Haverhill

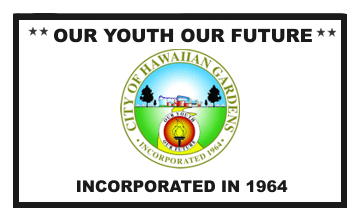
Hawaiian Gardens

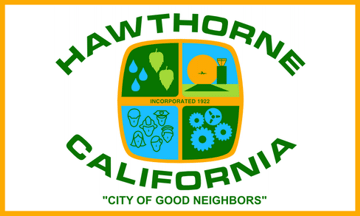
Hawthorne

Haysville

Hayward

Hazelwood

Hermann

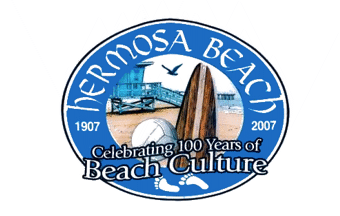
Hermosa Beach

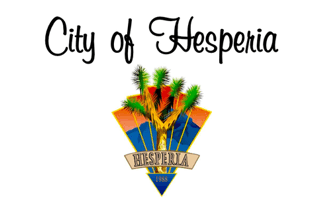
Hesperia

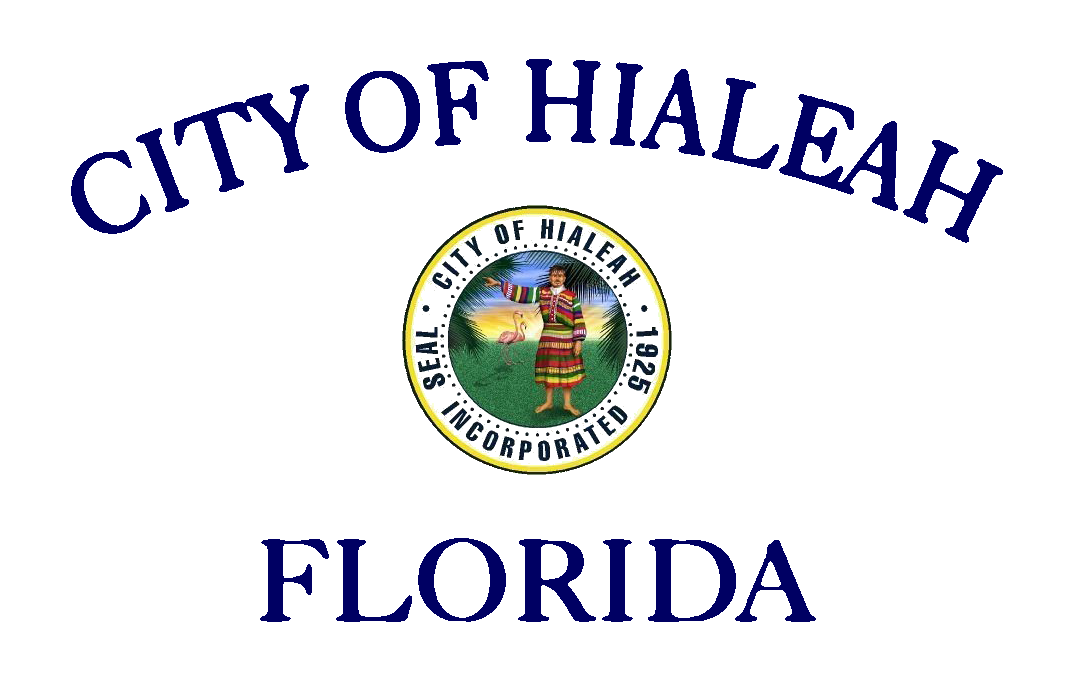
Hialeah

High Point

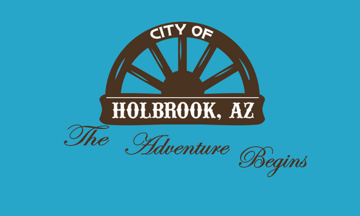
Holbrook

Holladay

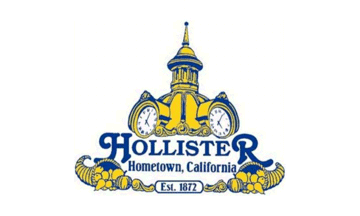
Hollister

Hollywood

Holmes Beach

Holyoke

Homer

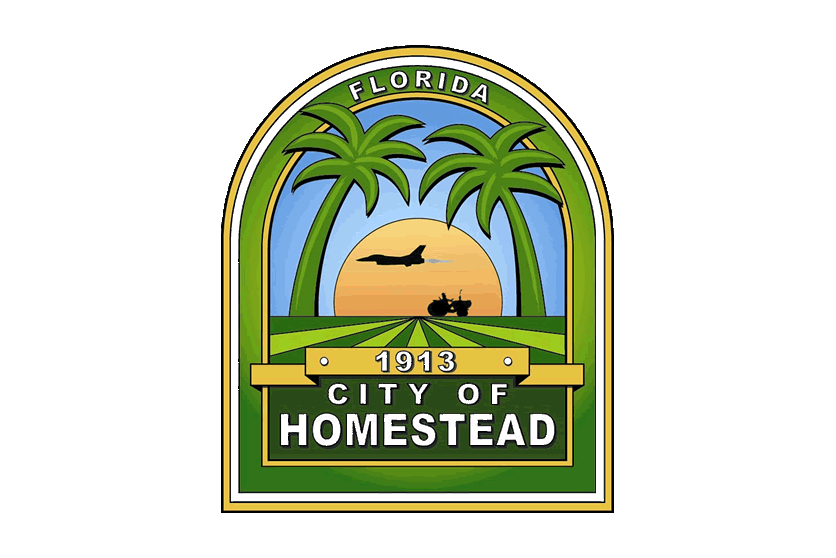
Homestead

Honolulu

Houston

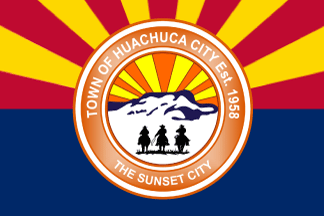
Huachuca City

Huntington Beach

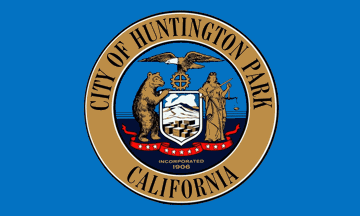
Huntington Park

Hutchinson

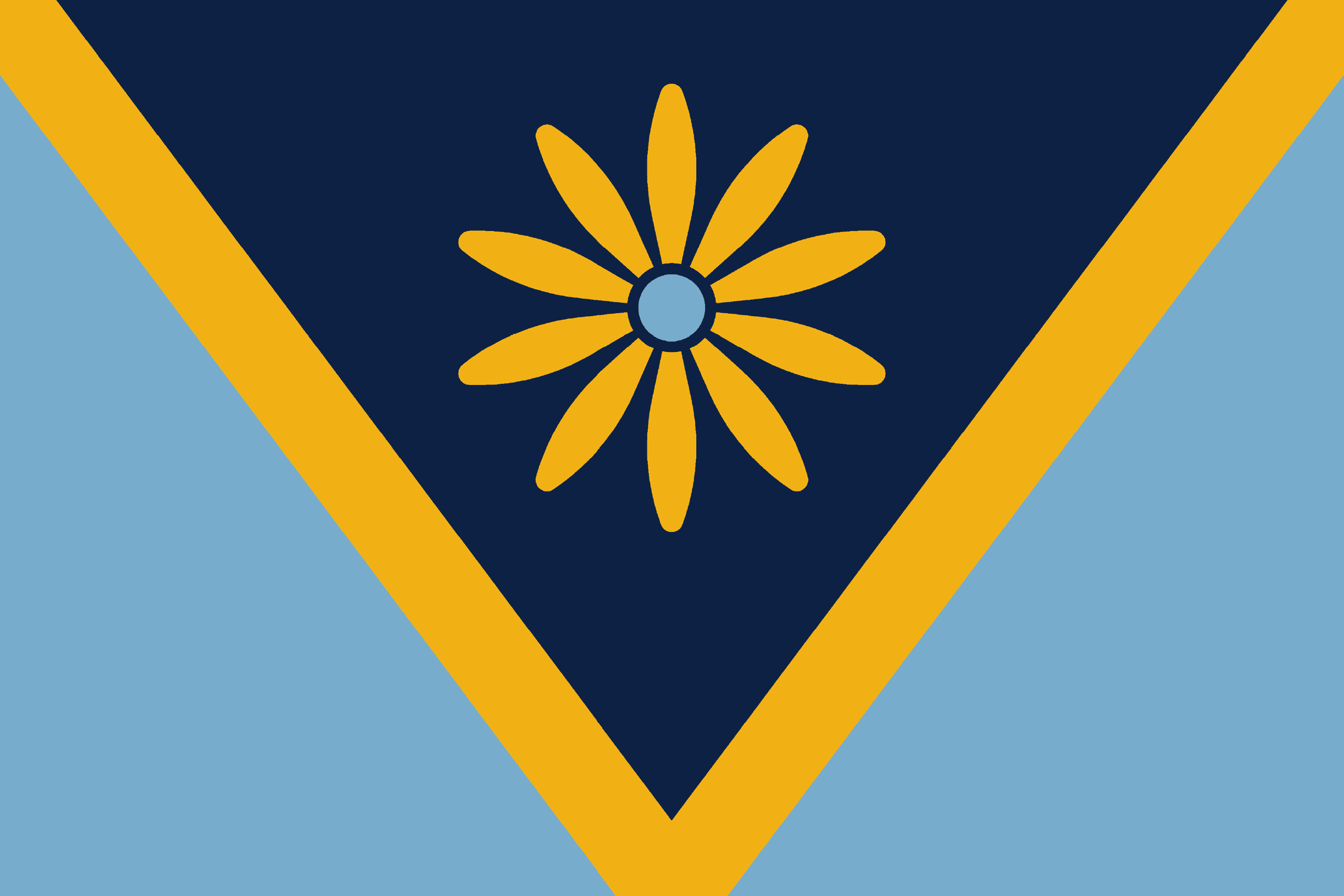
Hyattsville

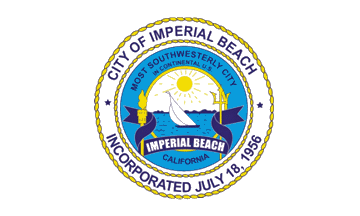
Imperial Beach

Indianapolis

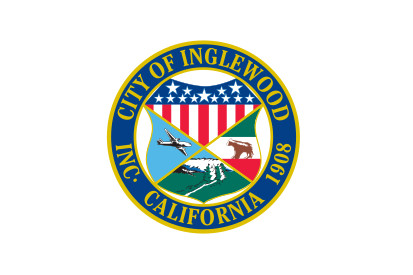
Inglewood

Irvine

Irving

Jackson

Jacksonville

Jamestown

Jefferson City

Jenks

Jennings

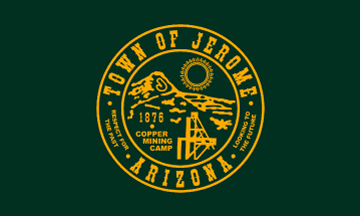
Jerome

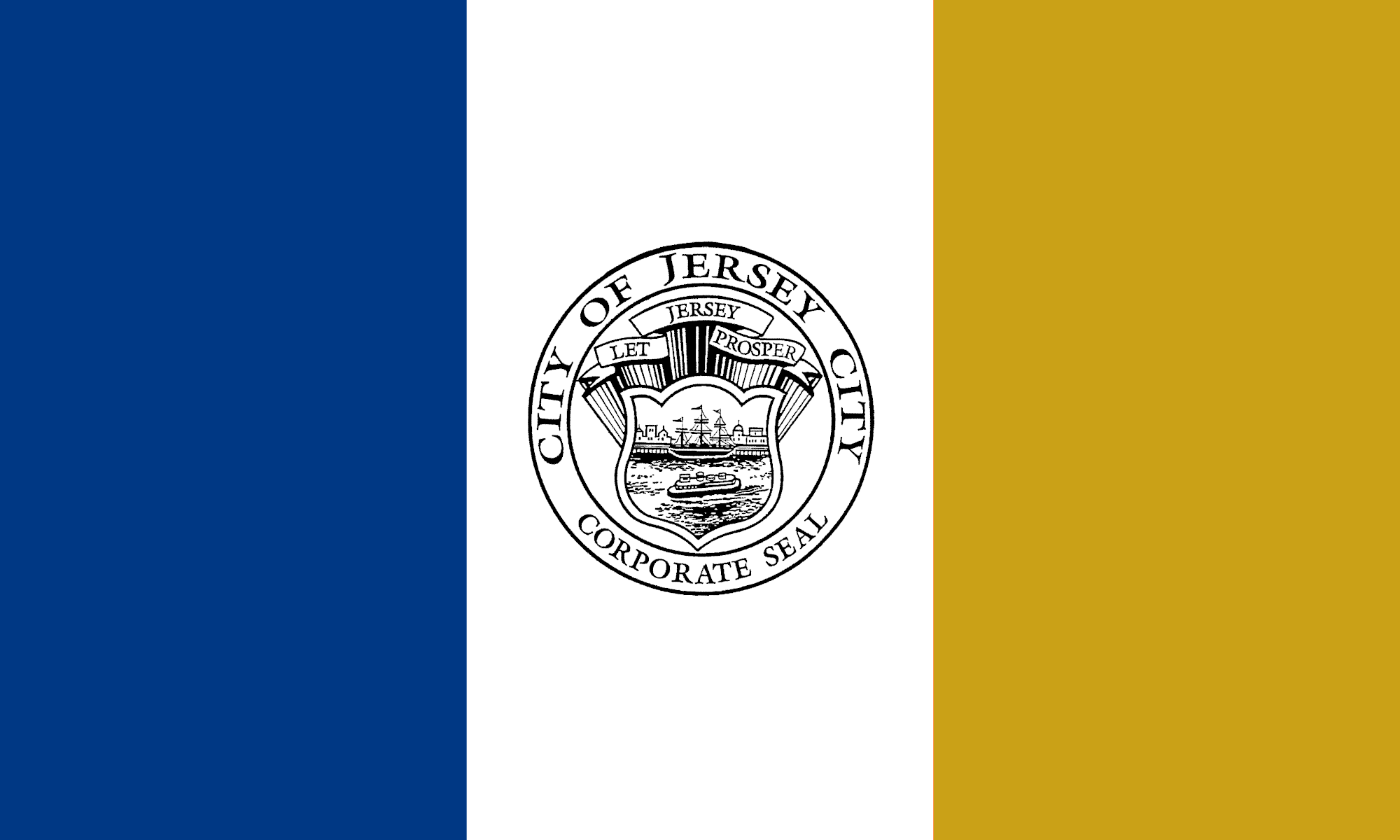
Jersey City

Johnstown

Julian

Juneau

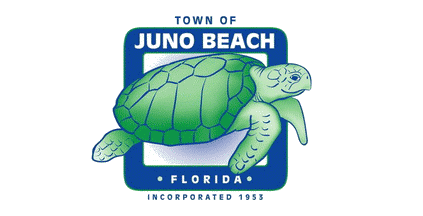
Juno Beach

Kansas City

Kelley

Kennebunkport

Kenner

Kent

Key West

Kingman, Arizona

Kingman, Kansas

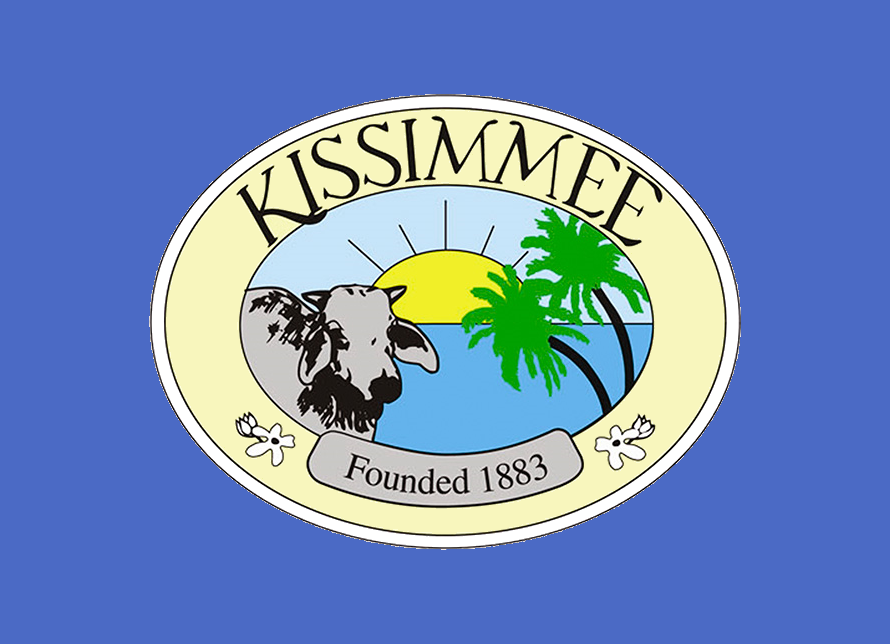
Kissimmee

Knoxville

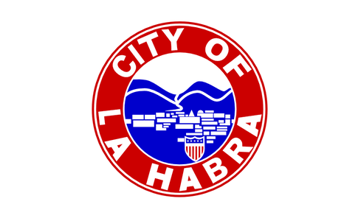
La Habra

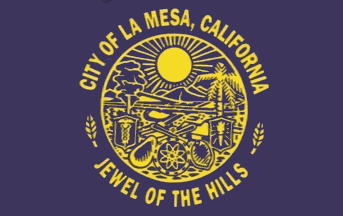
La Mesa

La Mirada

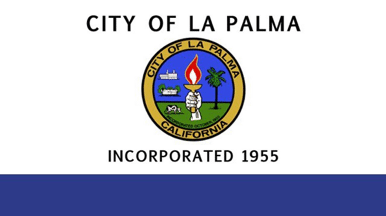
La Palma

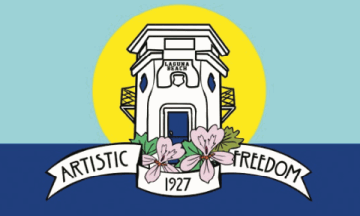
Laguna Beach

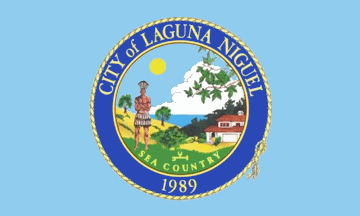
Laguna Niguel

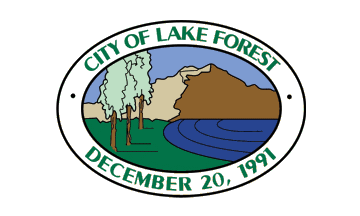
Lake Forest

Lake Havasu City

Lake St. Louis

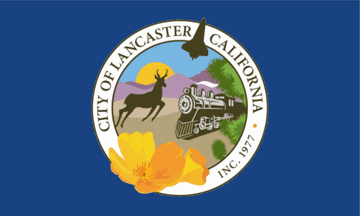
Lancaster, California

Lancaster, Pennsylvania

Las Vegas

Laredo

Lauderhill

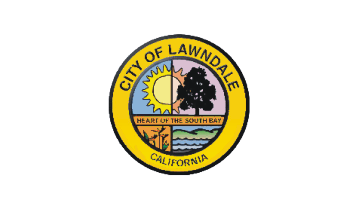
Lawndale

Lawrence, Indiana

Lawrence, Massachusetts

Layton

Lee's Summit

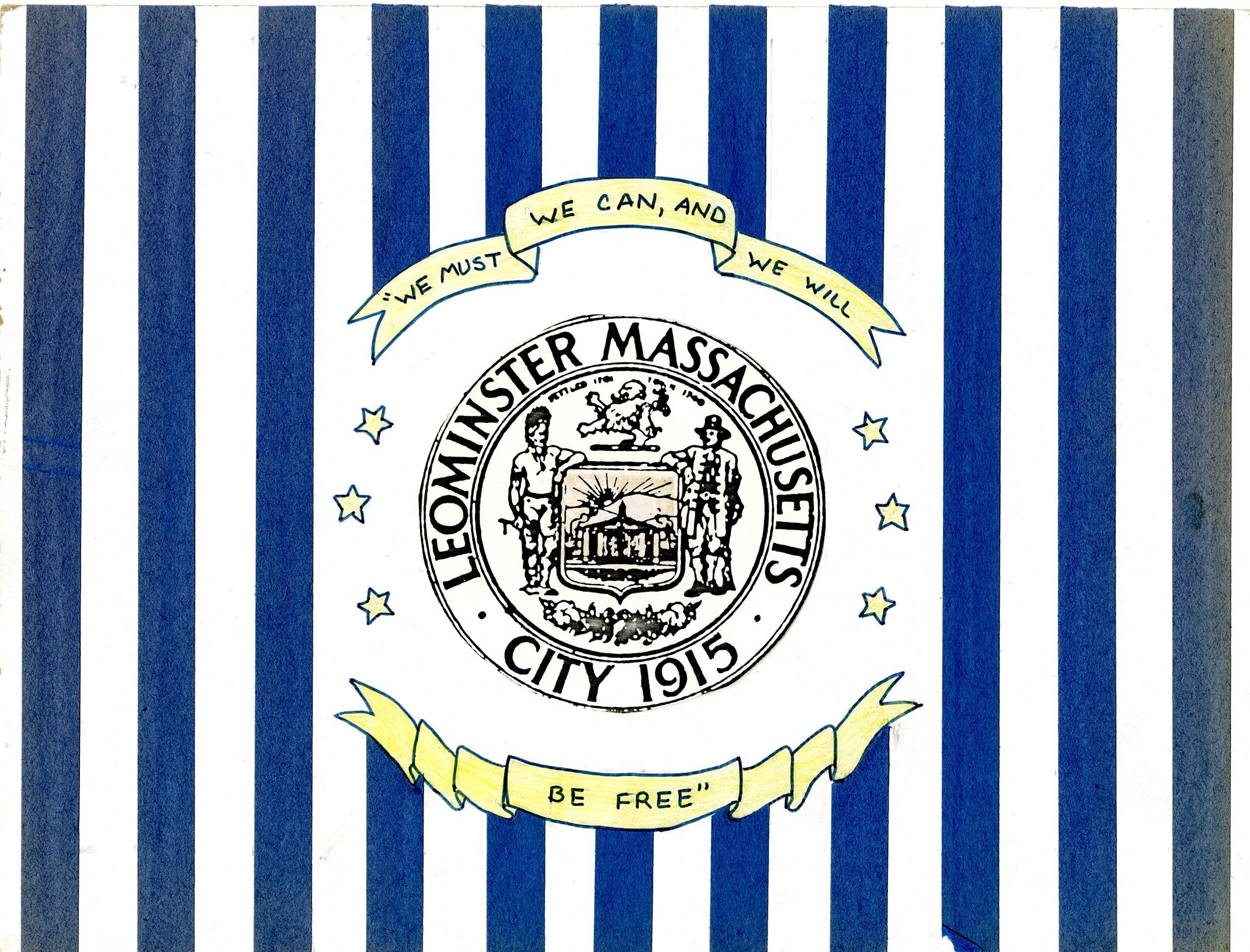
Leominster

Lincoln

Lineville

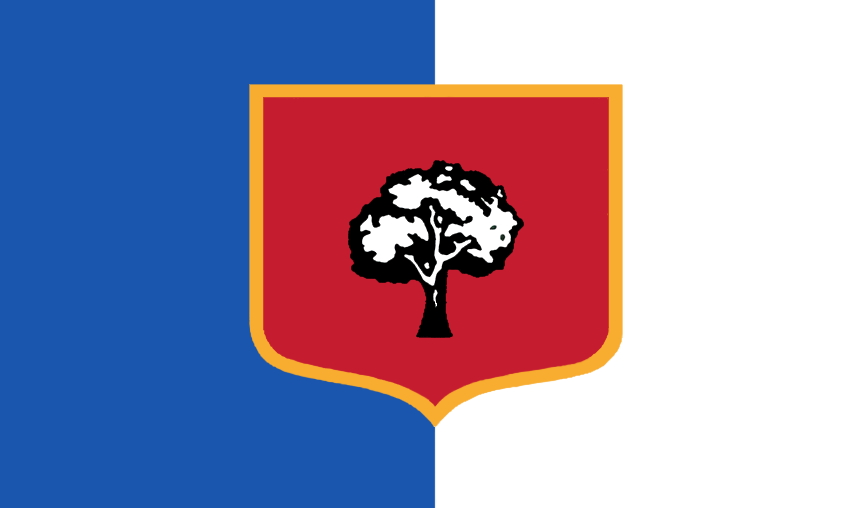
Lisbon

Litchfield Park

Little Rock

Livermore

Lockport

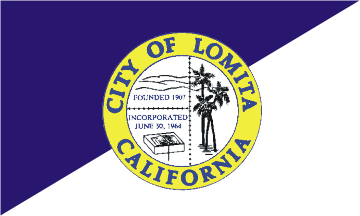
Lomita

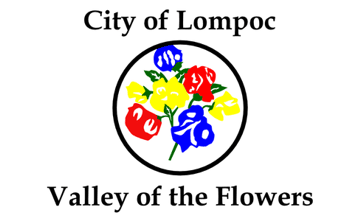
Lompoc

London

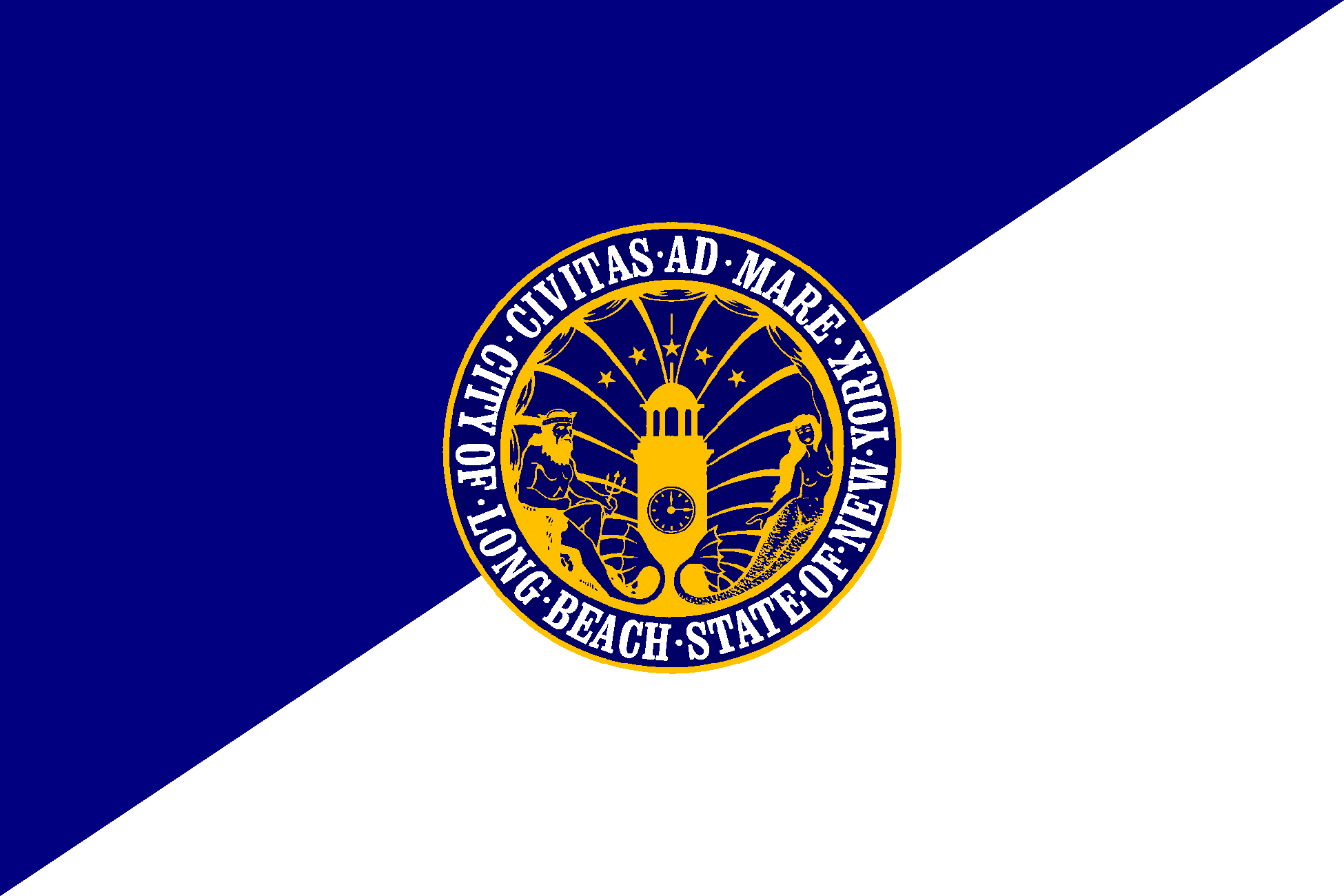
Long Beach

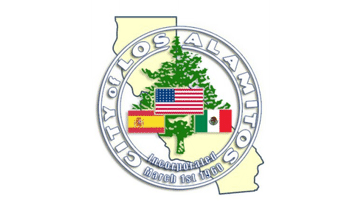
Los Alamitos

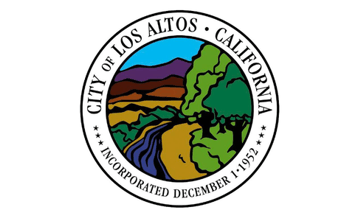
Los Altos

Los Angeles

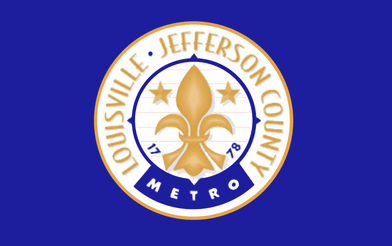
Louisville

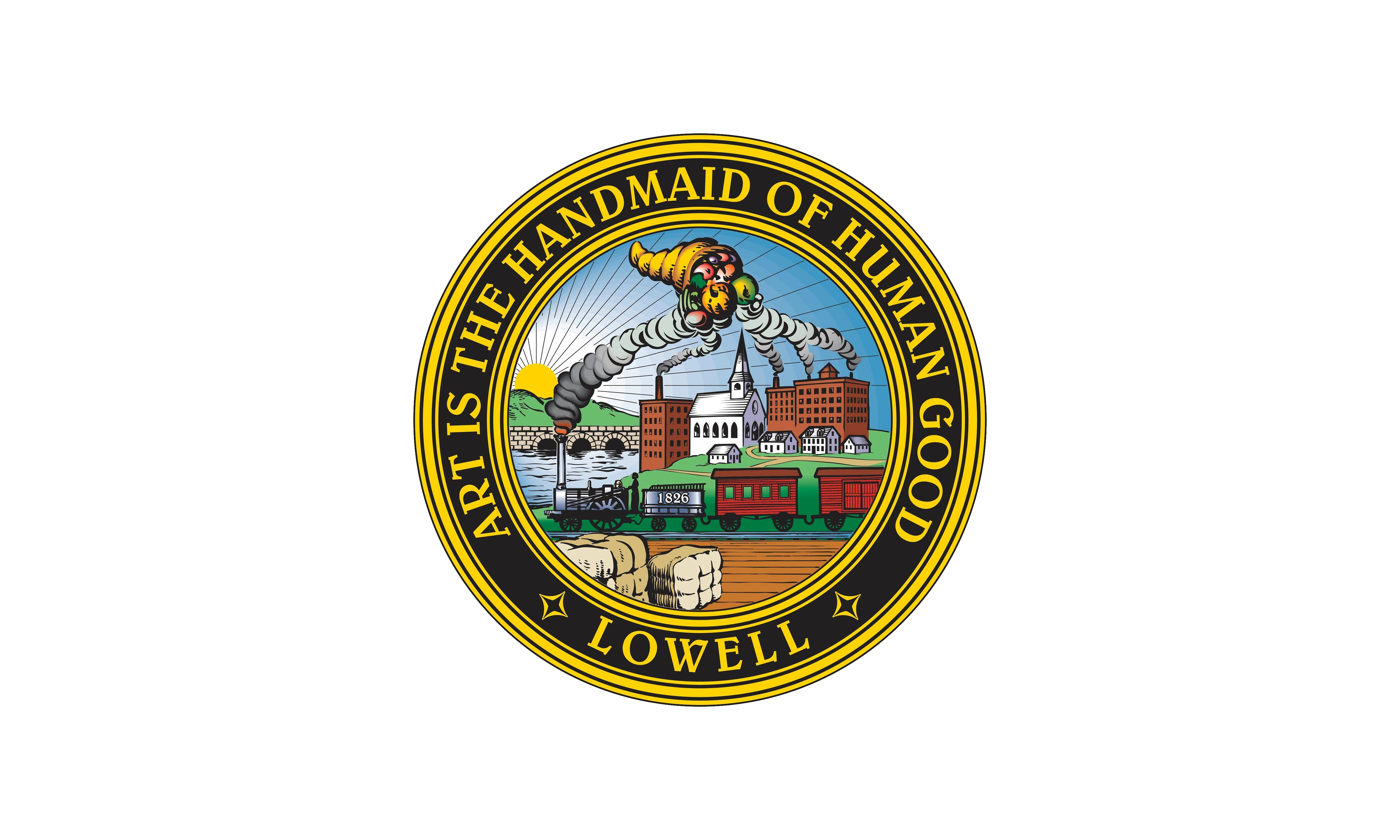
Lowell

Lubbock

Lyle

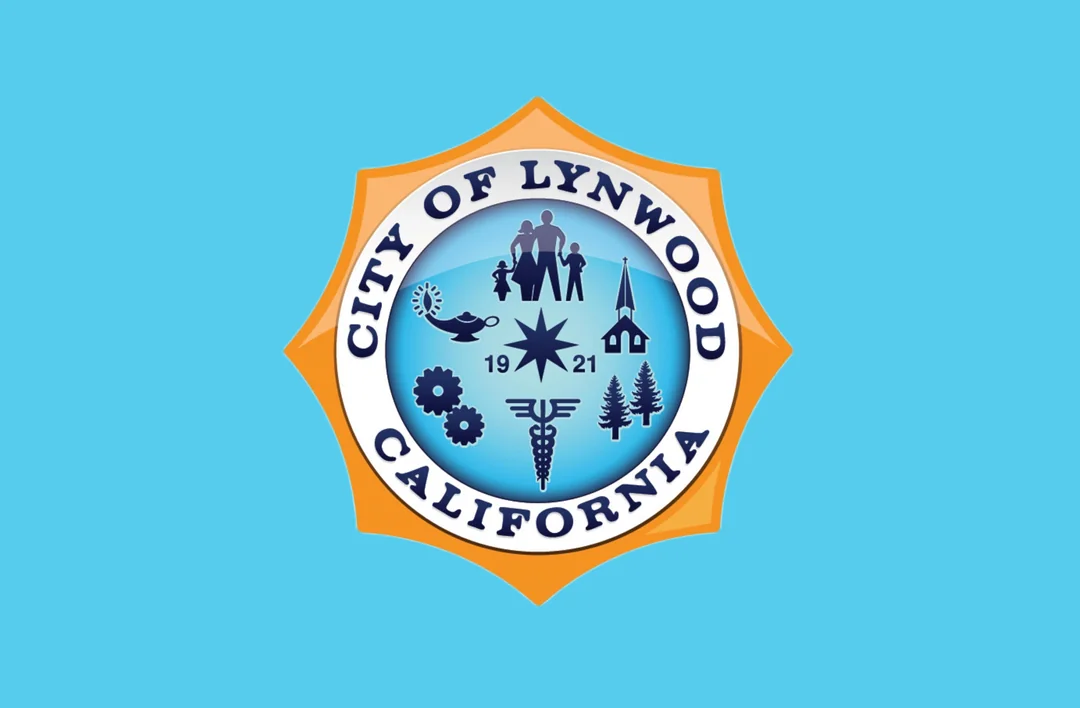
Lynwood

Madison, Georgia

Madison, Wisconsin

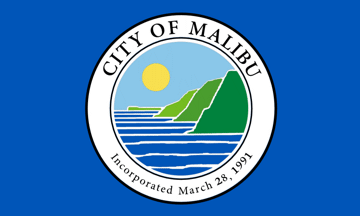
Malibu

Manhattan

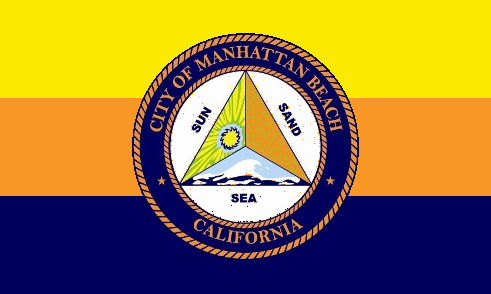
Manhattan Beach

Manitou Springs

Marana

Mansfield

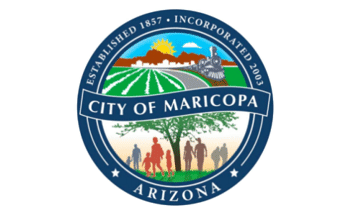
Maricopa

Medley

Melbourne

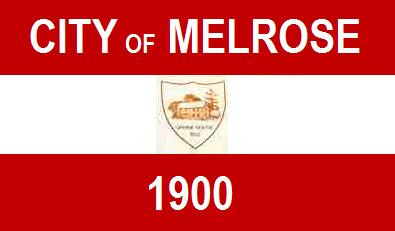
Melrose

Memphis

Merced

Mesa

Metairie

Miami, Arizona

Miami, Florida

Miami Lakes

Milford

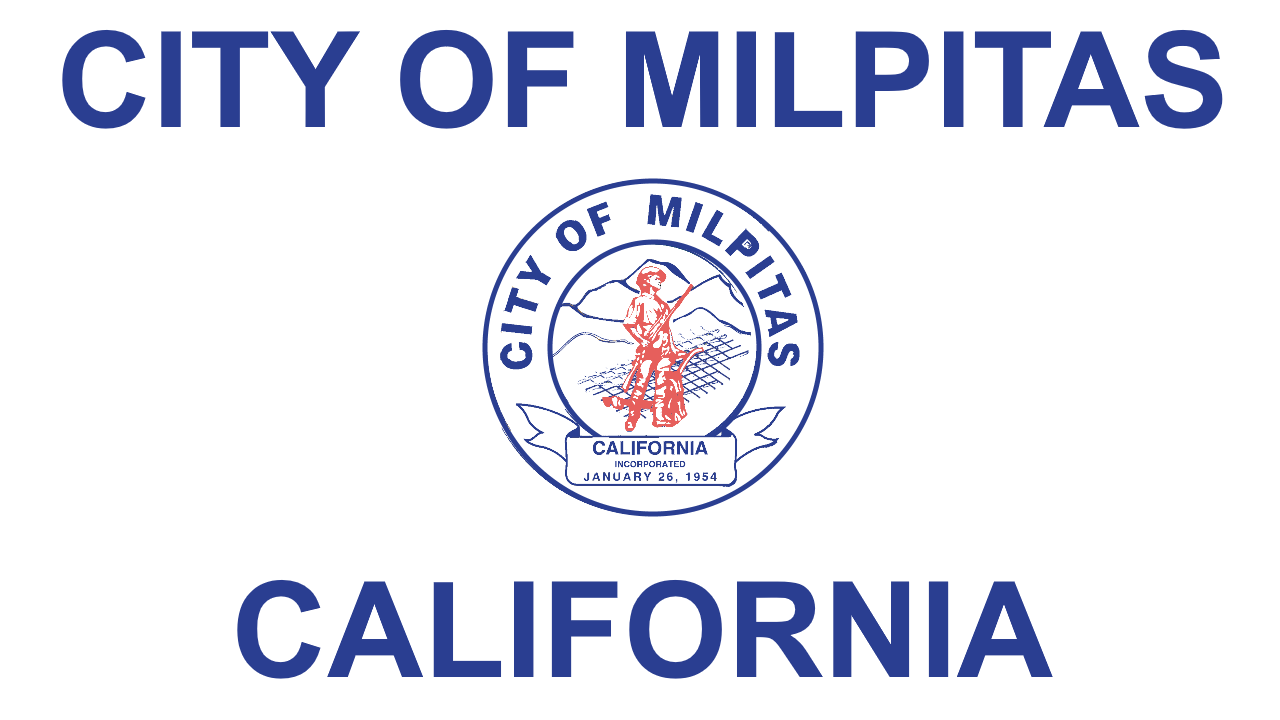
Milpitas

Milwaukee

Minneapolis

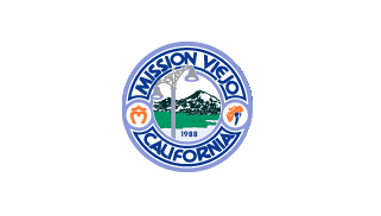
Mission Viejo

Missoula

Mobile

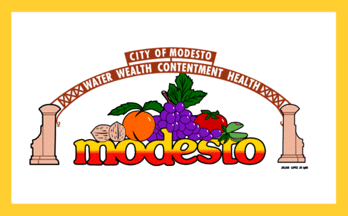
Modesto

Moncks Corner

Monterey

Montgomery, Alabama

Montgomery, Ohio

Montgomery, West Virginia

Montgomery Village

Montpelier

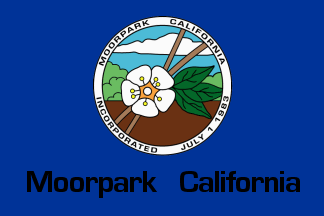
Moorpark

Morgan Hill

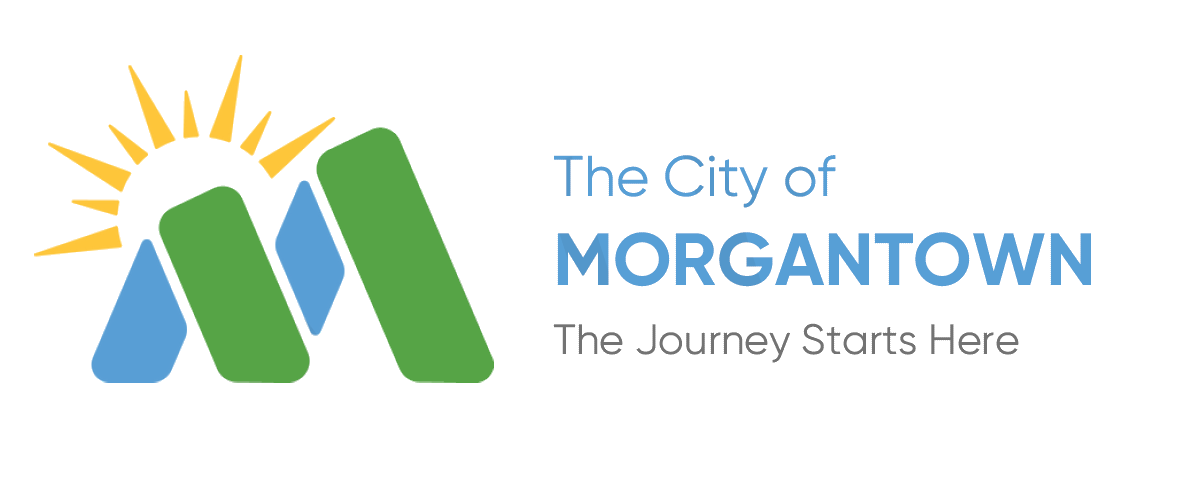
Morgantown

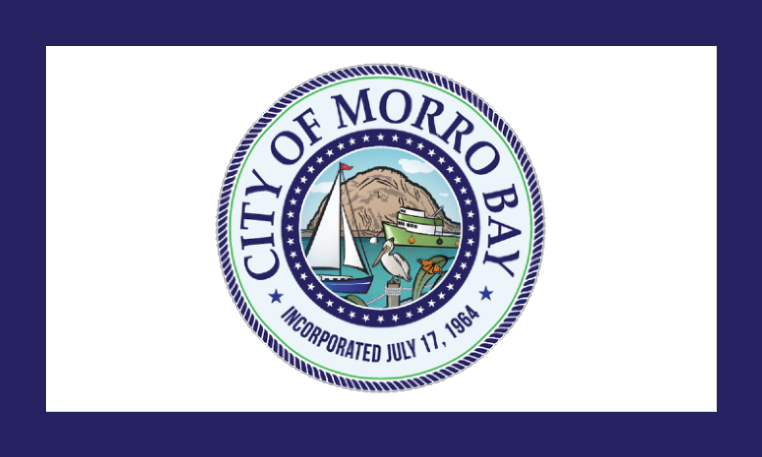
Morro Bay

Mount Dora

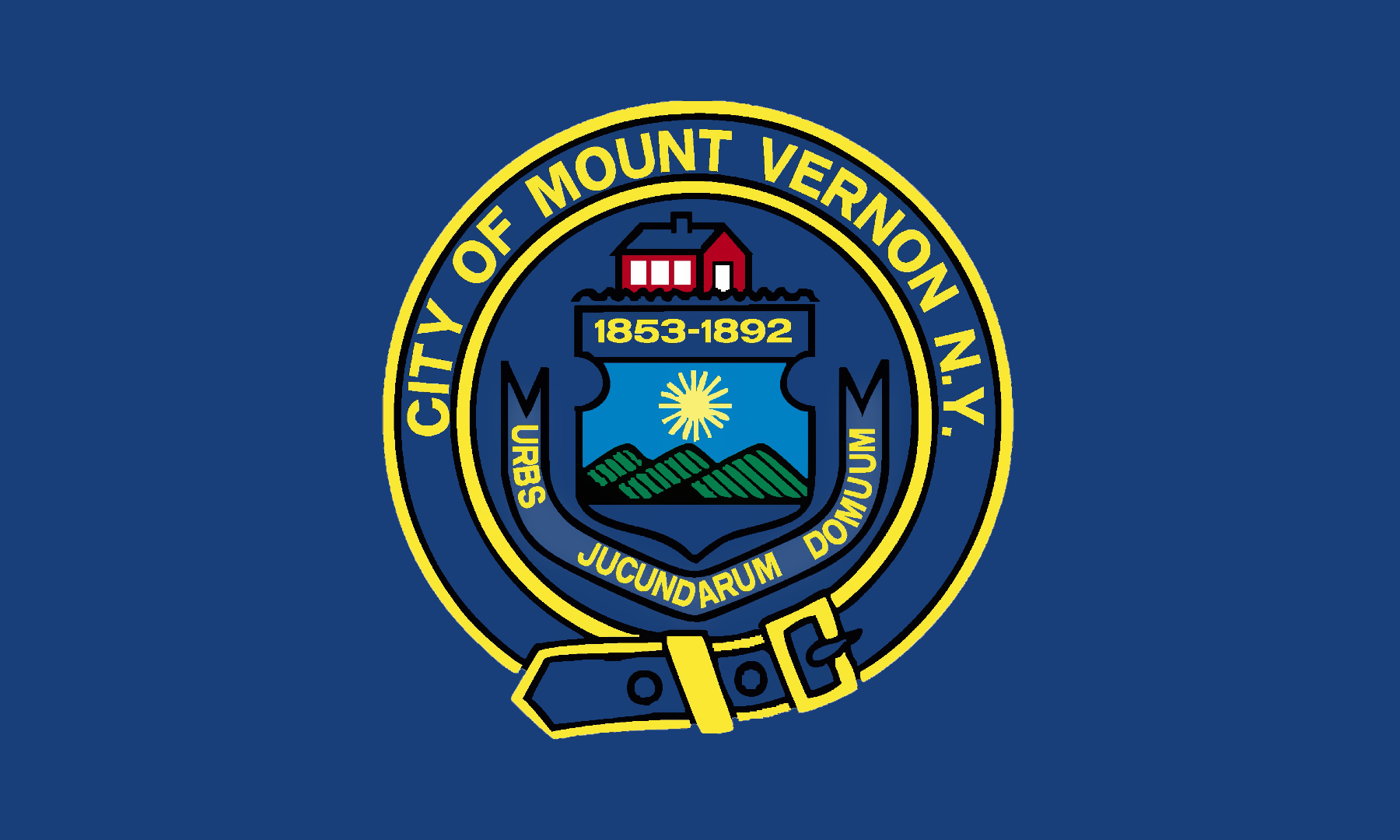
Mount Vernon

Mount Zion

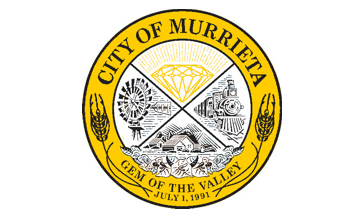
Murrieta

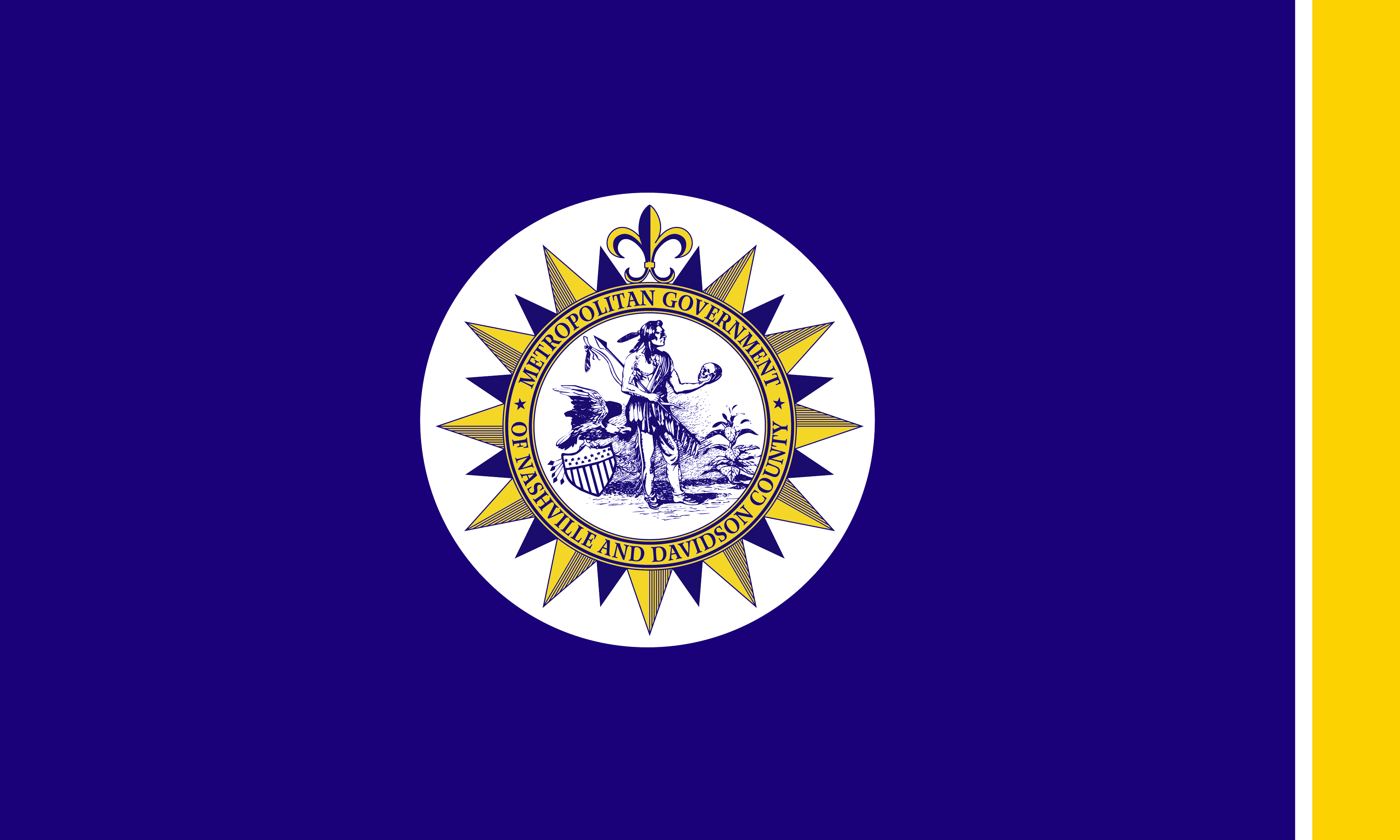
Nashville

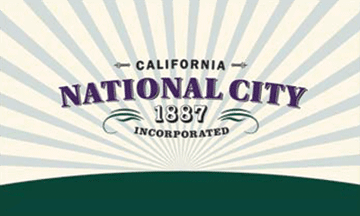
National City

New Bern

New Orleans

New Rochelle

New York City

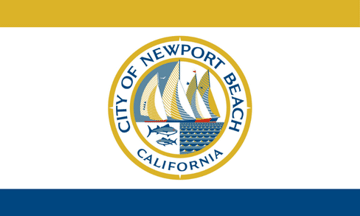
Newport Beach

Newton, Kansas

Newton, Massachusetts

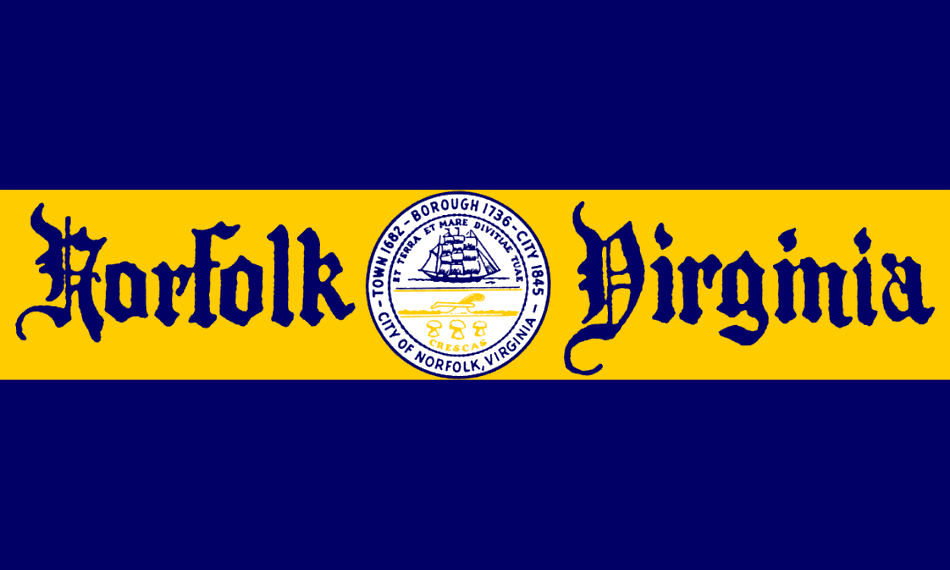
Norfolk

Norwalk

Nibley

Nixa

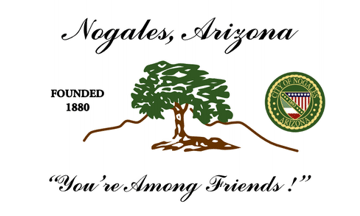
Nogales

Norman

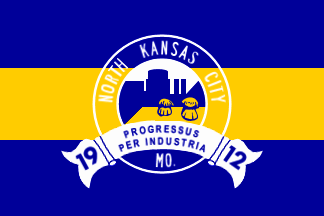
North Kansas City

North Newton

North Tonawanda

Northampton

Oakland

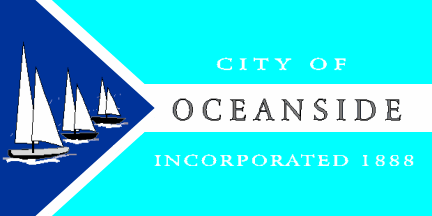
Oceanside

Ocean City

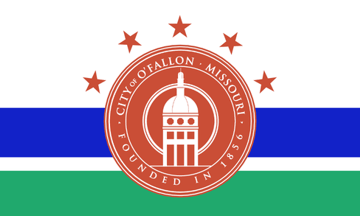
O'Fallon

Ogden

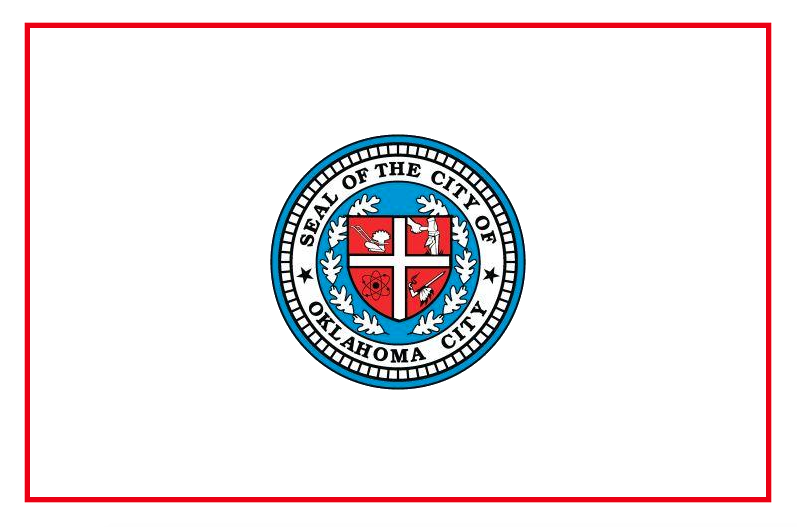
Oklahoma City

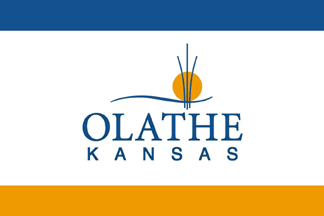
Olathe

Old Town

Omaha

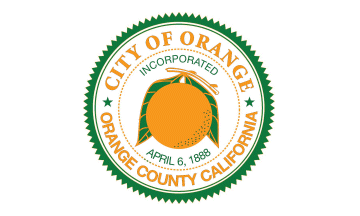
Orange

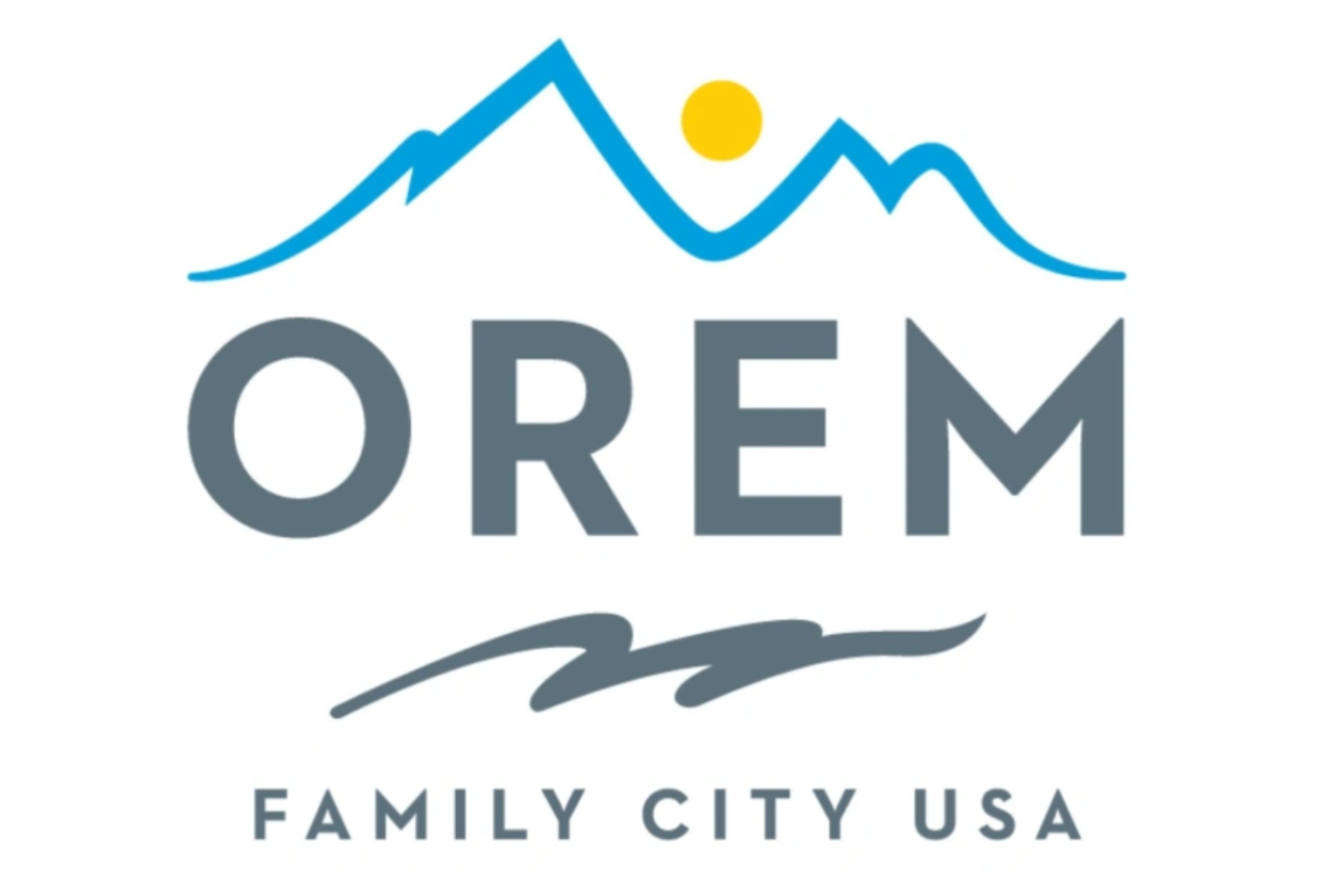
Orem

Orlando

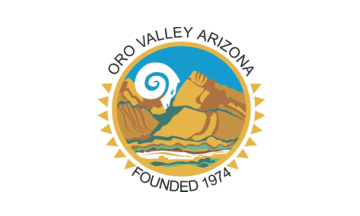
Oro Valley

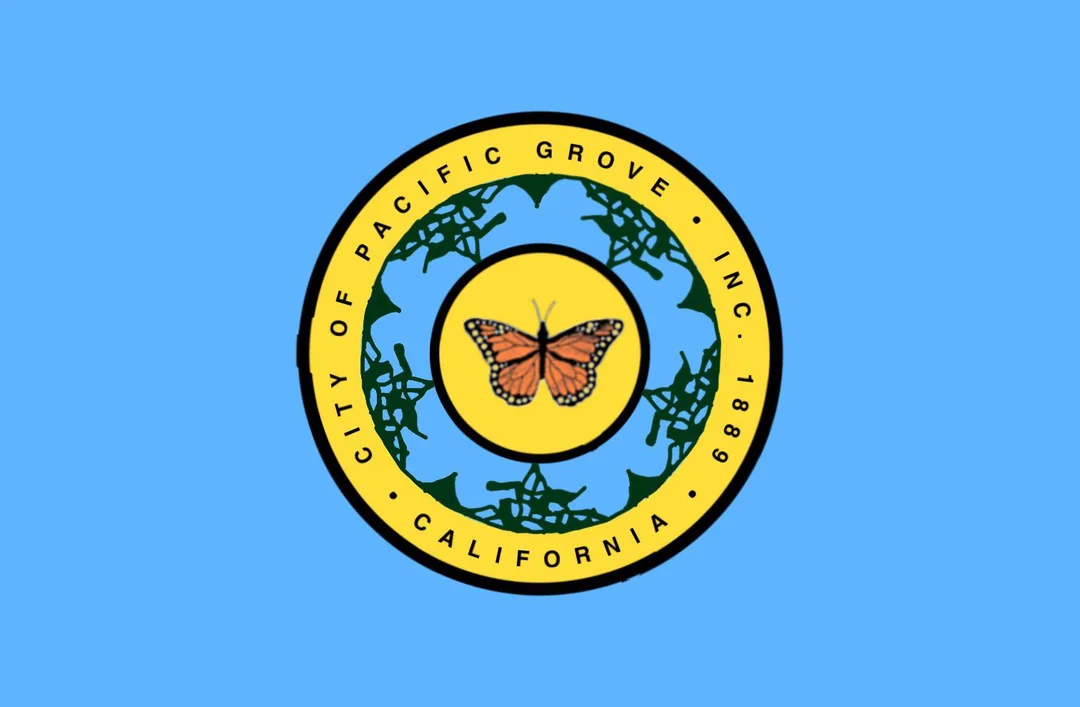
Pacific Grove

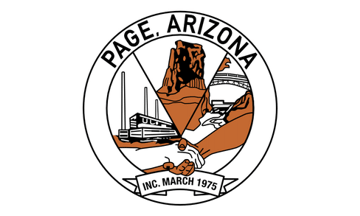
Page

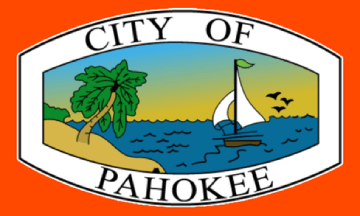
Pahokee

Palm Bay

Palm Springs

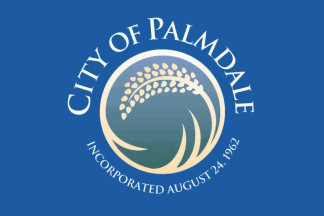
Palmdale

Palo Alto

Paradise

Paradise Valley

Park City

Parker

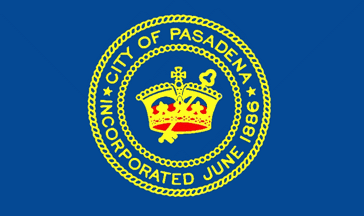
Pasadena

Pembroke Pines

Peoria

Phoenix

Philadelphia

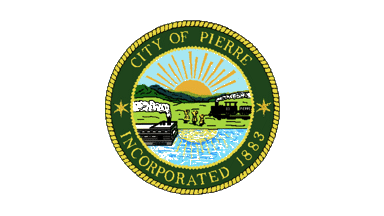
Pierre

Pima

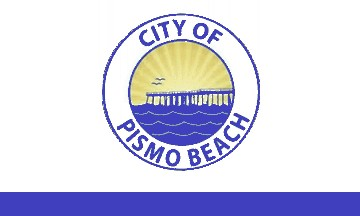
Pismo Beach

Pittsburgh

Placentia

Plano

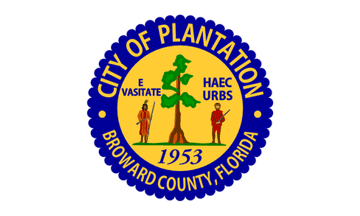
Plantation

Pocatello

Pompano Beach

Ponce

Port Clinton

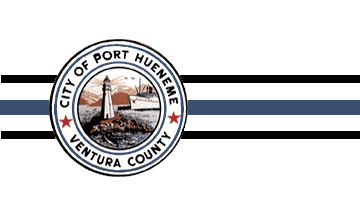
Port Hueneme

Port Orange

Portland

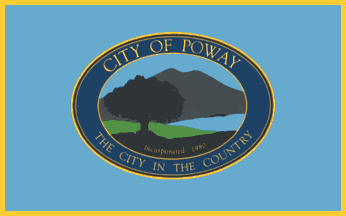
Poway

Prescott Valley

Provo

Queen Creek

Queenstown

Quincy

Raleigh

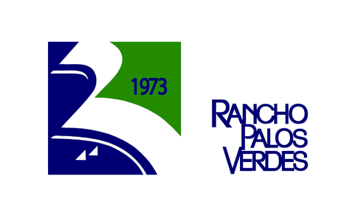
Rancho Palos Verdes

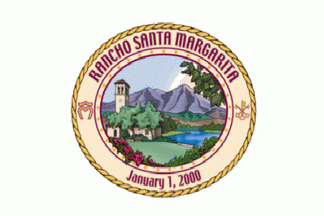
Rancho Santa Margarita

Red Oak

Redding

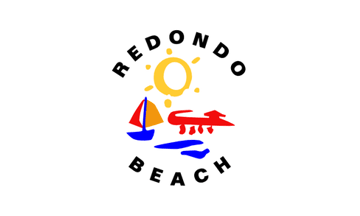
Redondo Beach

Reno

Richland

Riverside

Robertsdale

Rochester

Rockville

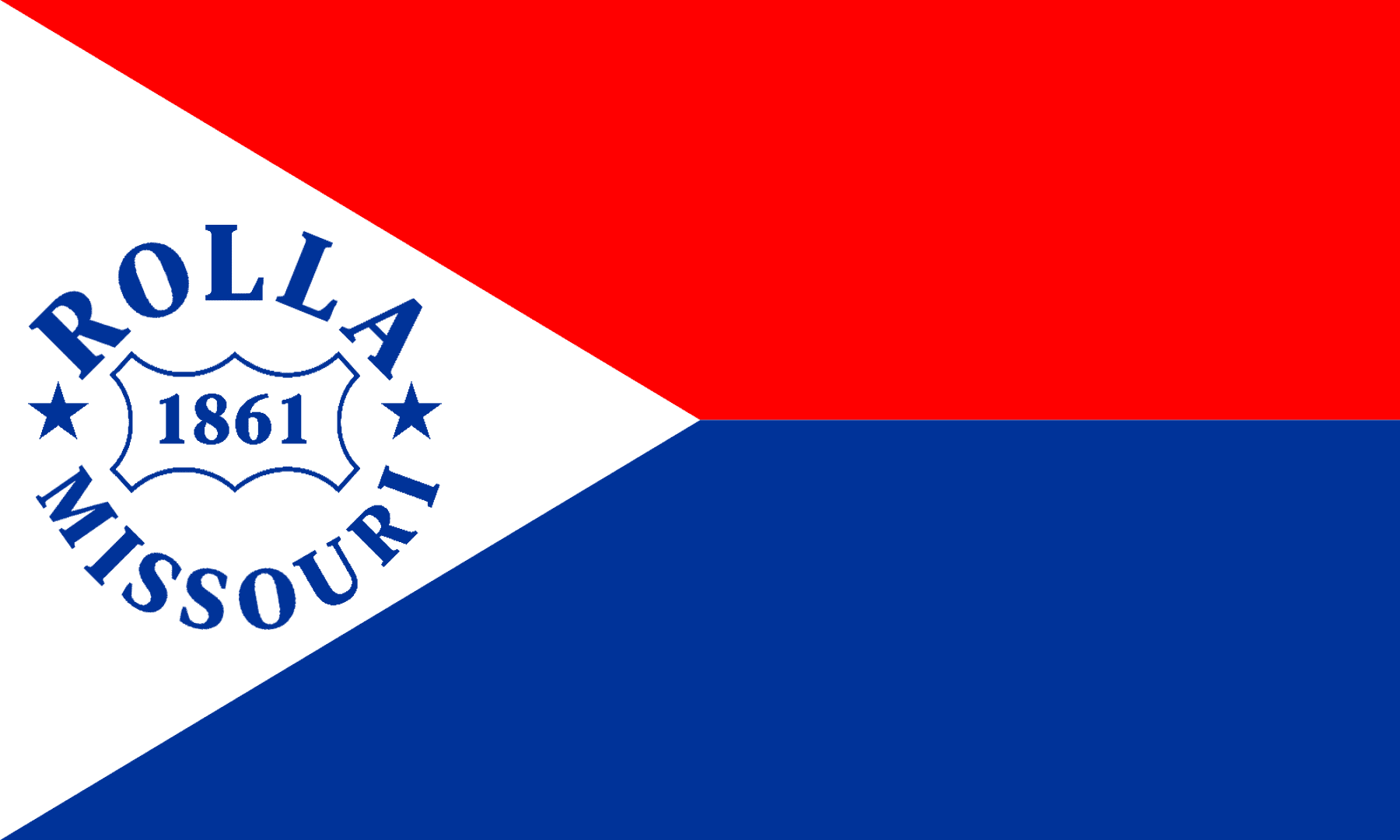
Rolla

Roswell

Sacramento

Safford

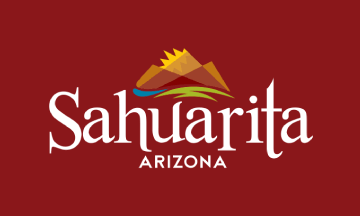
Sahuarita

St. Charles

St. George

St. Johns

St. Louis

St. Michaels

St. Petersburg

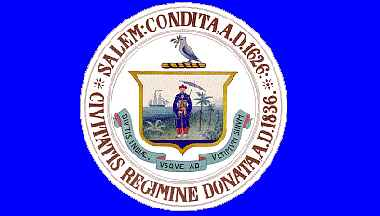
Salem, Massachusetts

Salem, Oregon

Salisbury

Salt Lake City

Salt Lake City

Salt Lake City

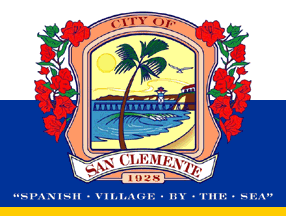
San Clemente

San Diego

San Francisco

San Jose

San Juan

San Luis Obispo

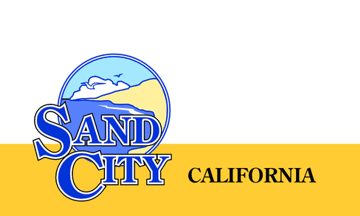
Sand City

Sandy

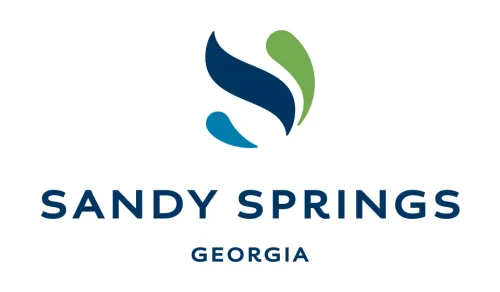
Sandy Springs

Santa Ana

Santa Barbara

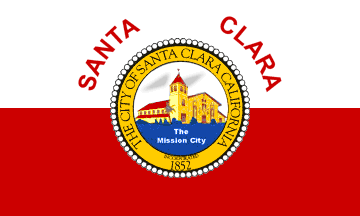
Santa Clara

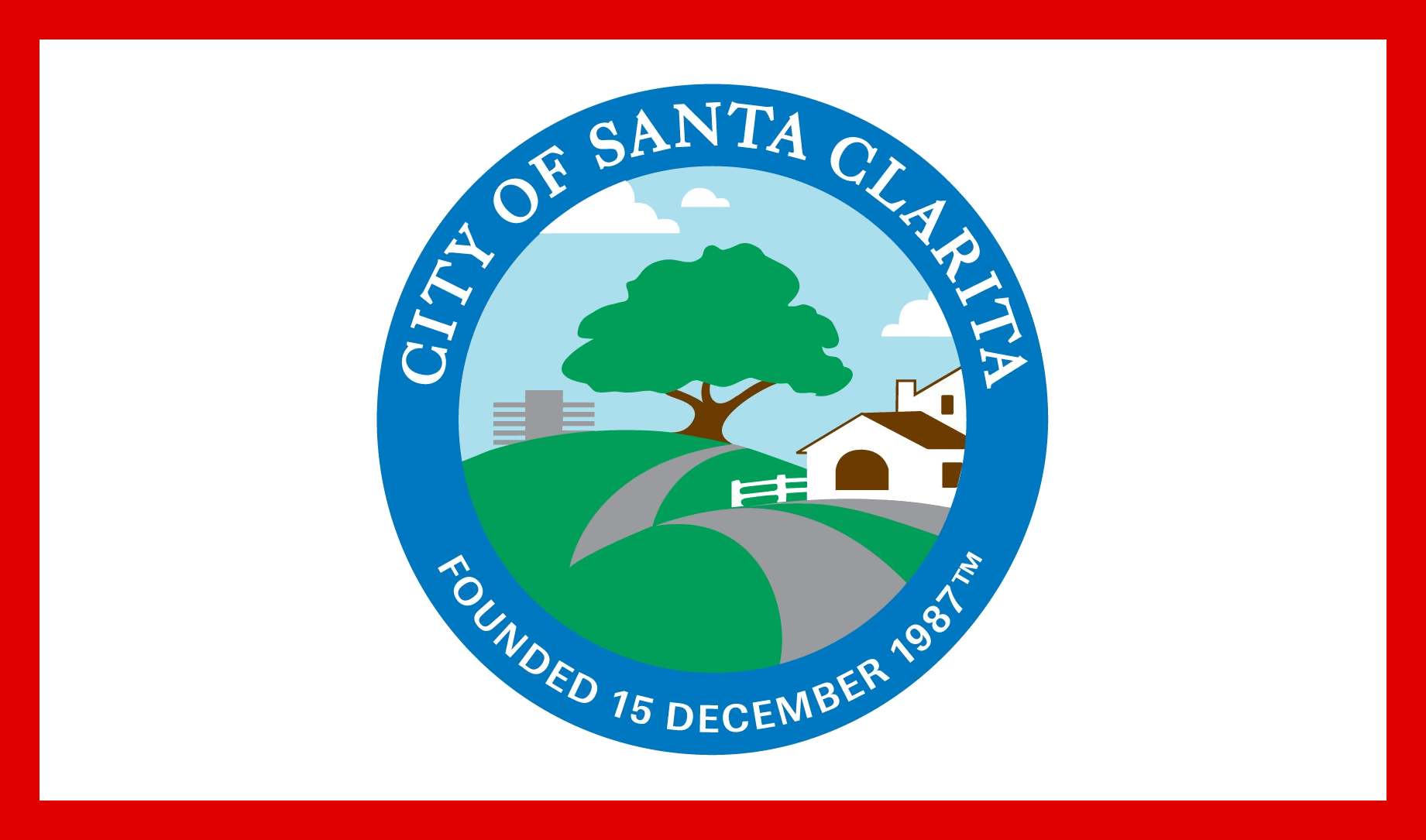
Santa Clarita

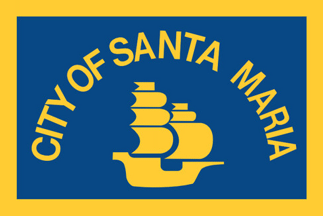
Santa Maria

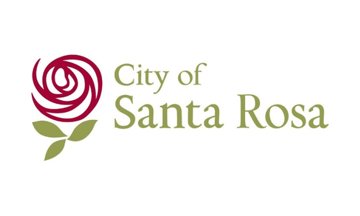
Santa Rosa

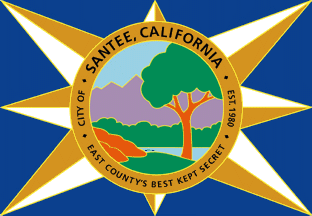
Santee

Sarasota

Satellite Beach

Savannah

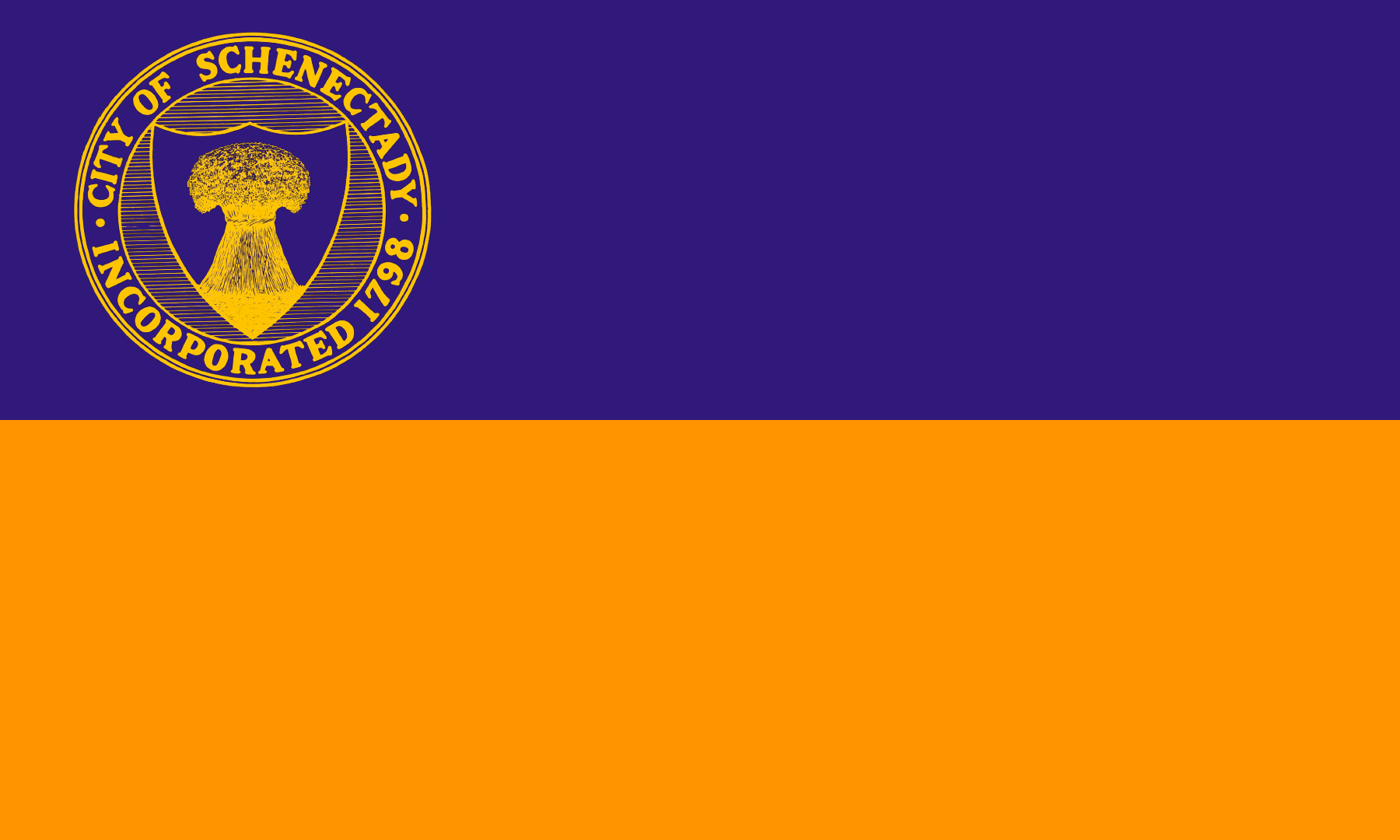
Schenectady

Scottsdale

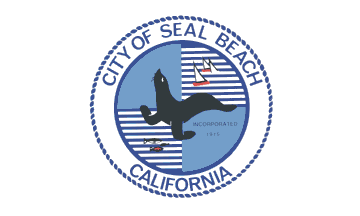
Seal Beach

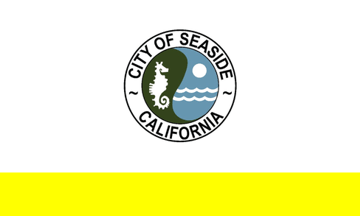
Seaside

Sedona

Seward

Show Low

Sierra Vista

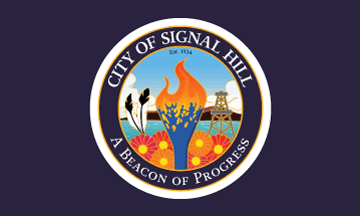
Signal Hill

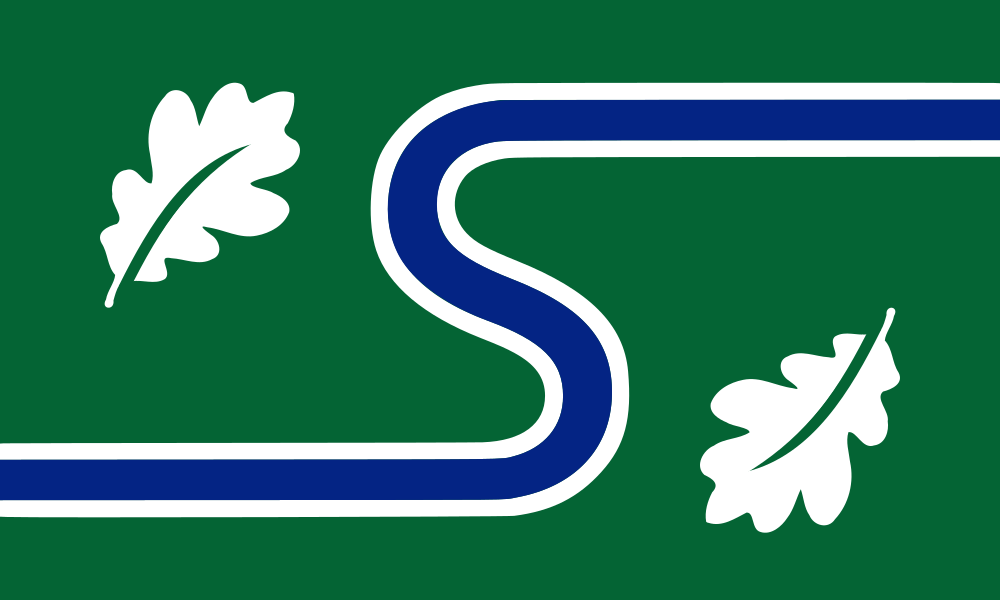
Silverton

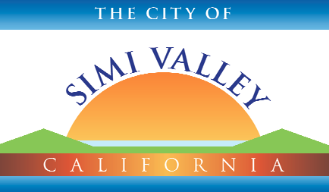
Simi Valley

Sioux Falls

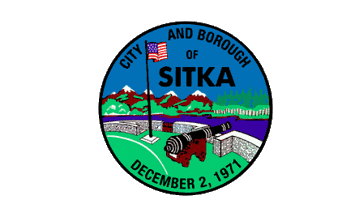
Sitka

Snowflake

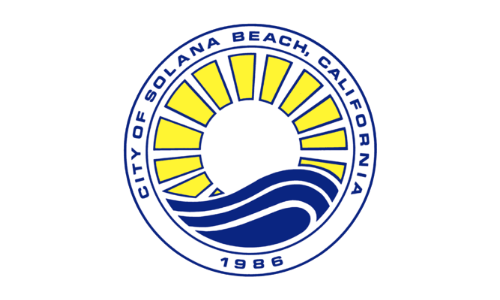
Solana Beach

South Bend

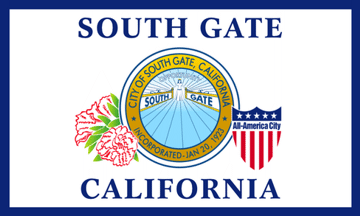
South Gate

South Tucson

Southbridge

Spokane

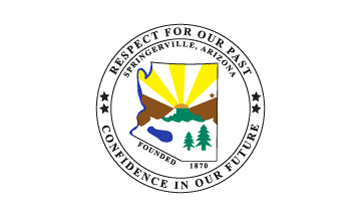
Springerville

Springfield, Illinois

Springfield, Massachusetts

Springfield, Missouri

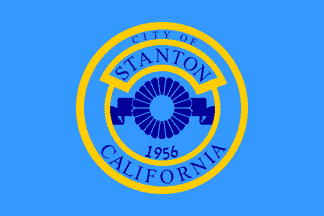
Stanton

Star Valley

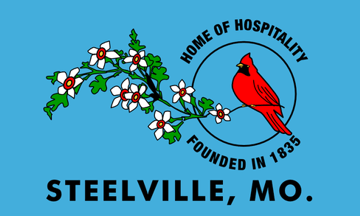
Steelville

Sun City

Sun City West

Sunnyvale

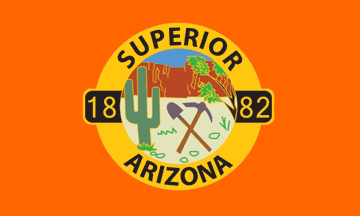
Superior

Surprise

Syracuse

Tacoma

Tallahassee

Tamarac

Tampa

Taunton

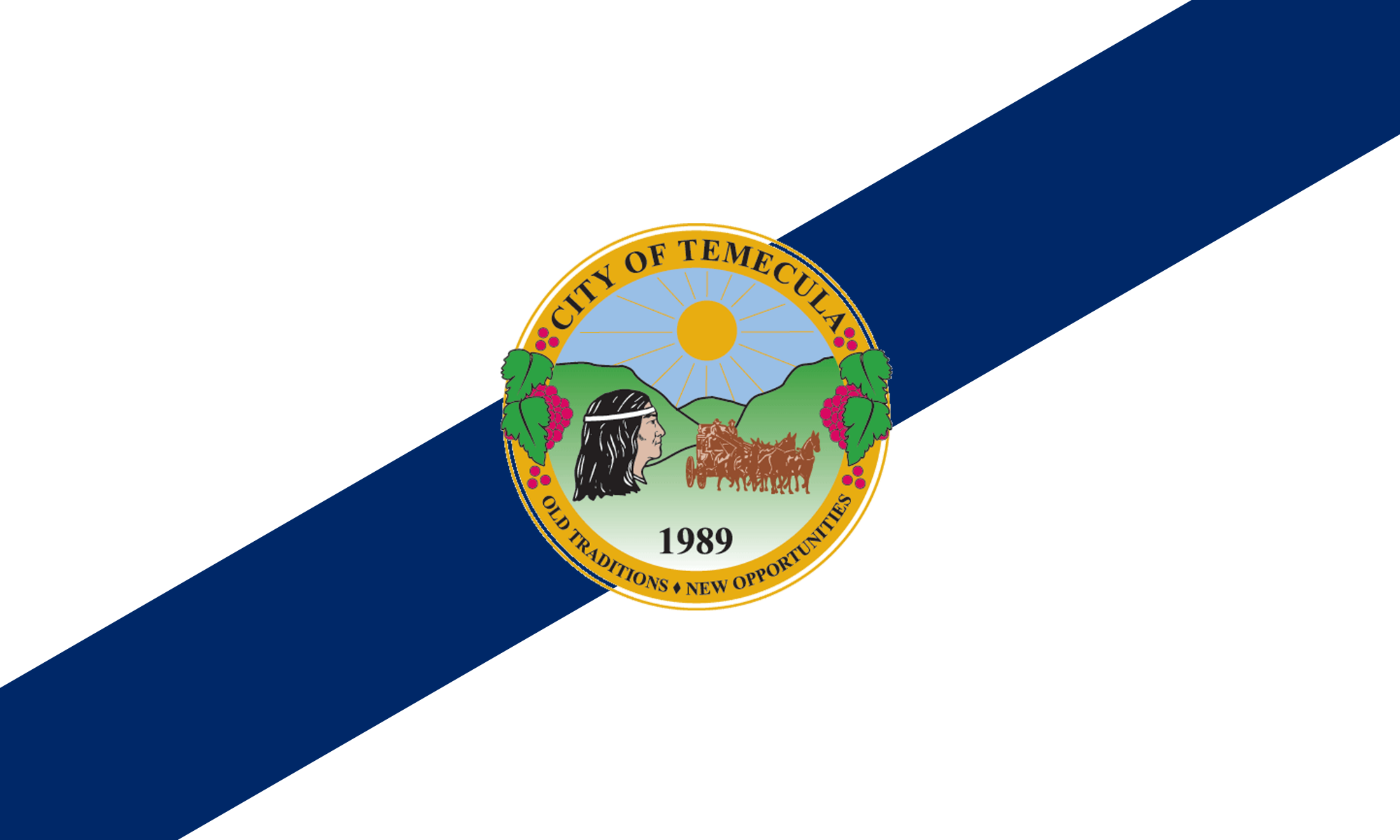
Temecula

Tempe

Terre Haute

Thatcher

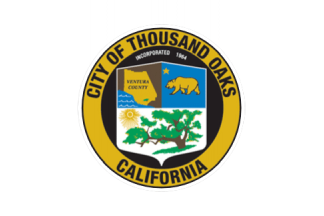
Thousand Oaks

Toledo

Topeka

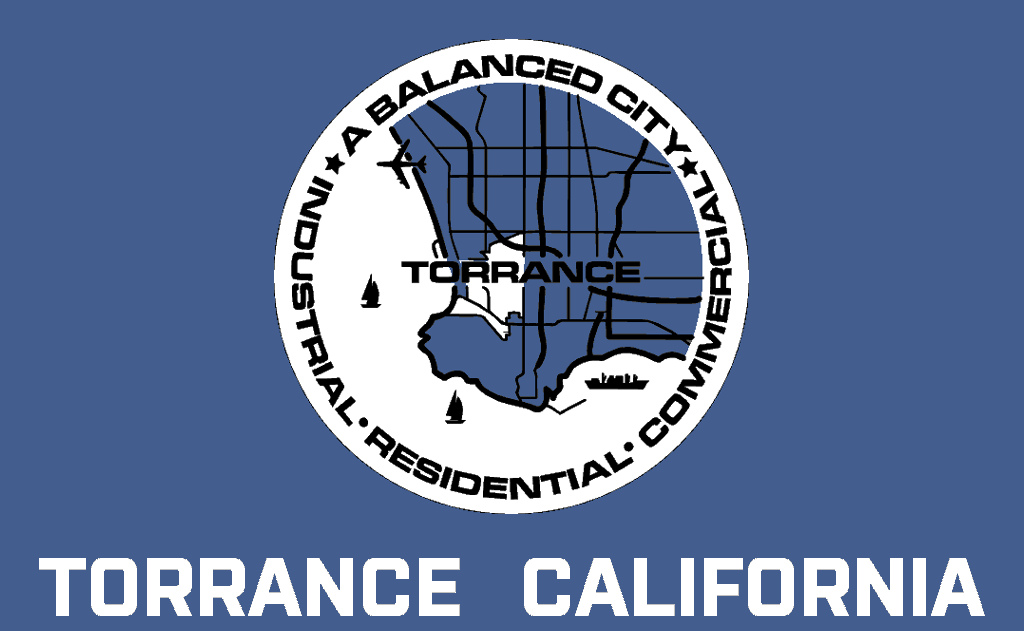
Torrance

Trenton

Tucson

Tulsa

Tusayan

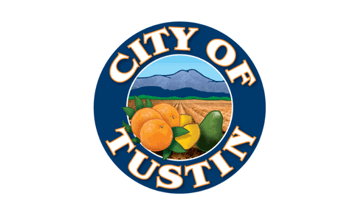
Tustin

Union

Union City

Upper Arlington

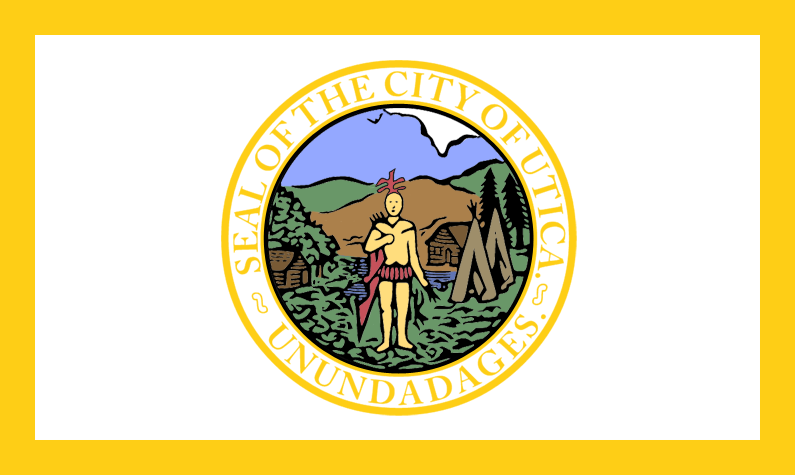
Utica

Valley, Nebraska

Vermillion

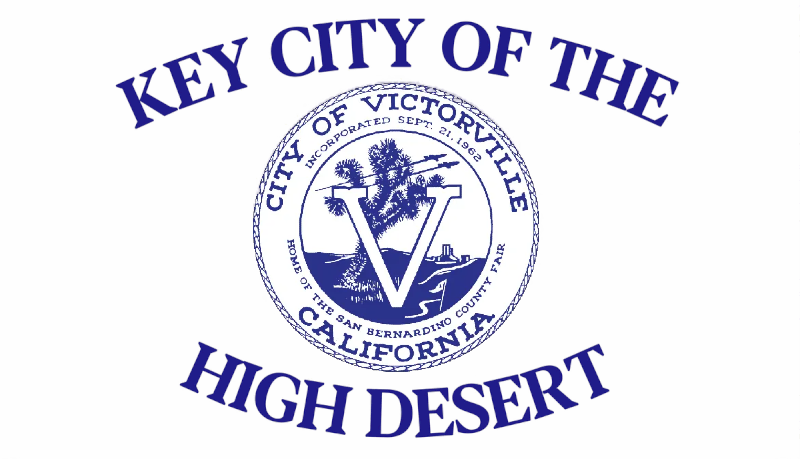
Victorville

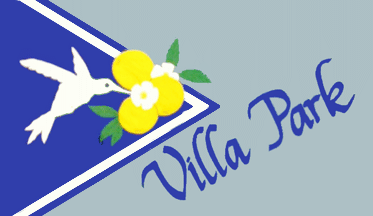
Villa Park

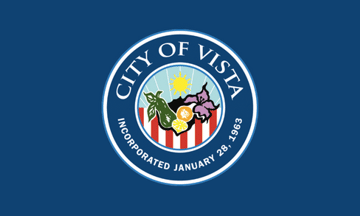
Vista

Walla Walla

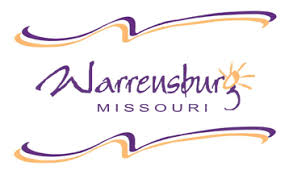
Warrensburg

Washington, D.C.

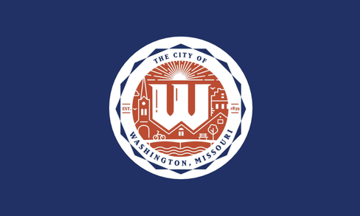
Washington

Waterloo

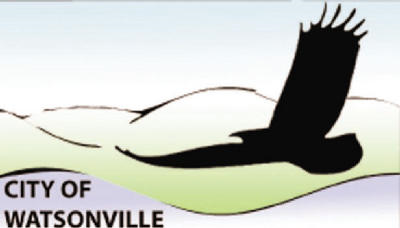
Watsonville

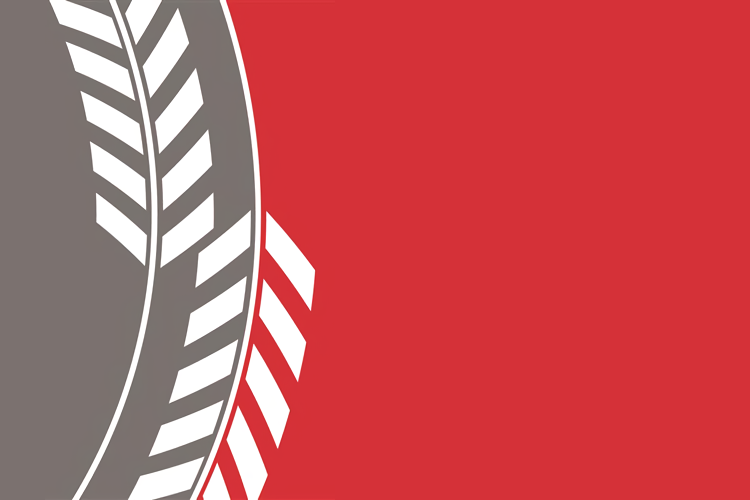
Wellington

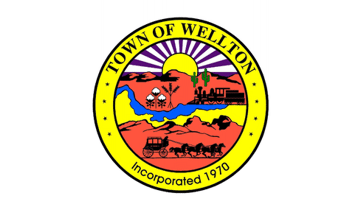
Wellton

West Chester

West Hollywood

West Memphis

West Plains

West Springfield

West Valley City

Westfield

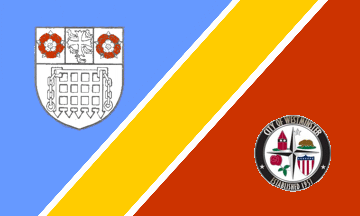
Westminster

Wheeling

Whittier, Alaska

Whittier, California

Wichita

Wickenburg

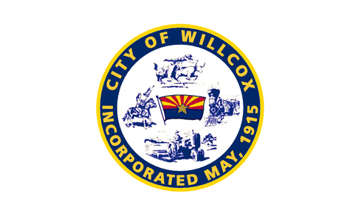
Willcox

Winslow

Worcester

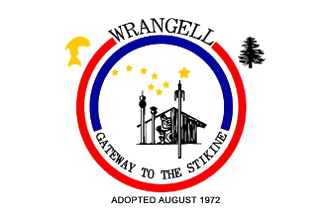
Wrangell

Yorba Linda

Youngtown

Yuma

=== Historical ===
Anaheim (2018–2019)

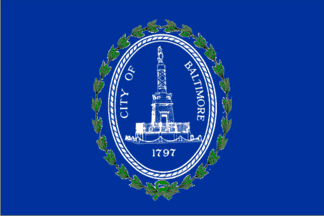
Baltimore (1899-1915)

Baton Rouge (1968–1995)

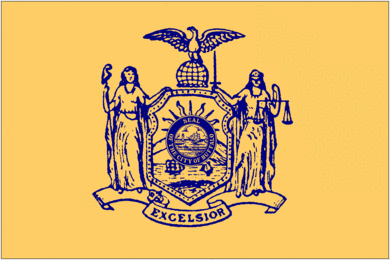
Buffalo (1912-1924)

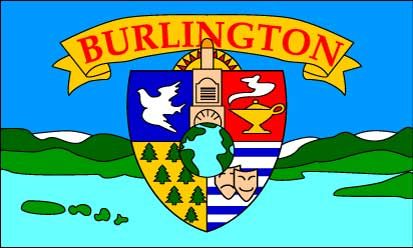
Burlington (1990-2017)

Cedar City (2010–2023)

Chicago (1917–1933)

Chicago (1933–1939)

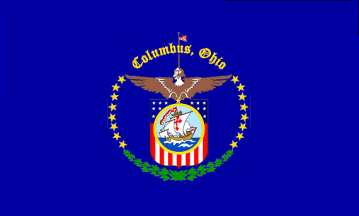
Columbus (1912-1929)

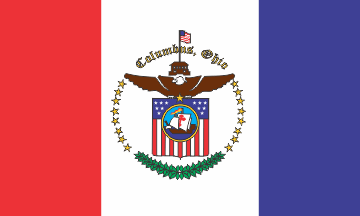
Columbus (c.1965-1975)

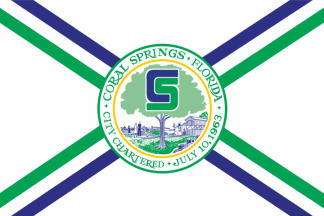
Coral Springs (until 2017)

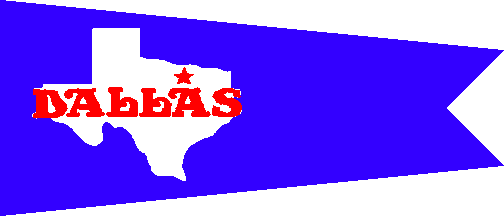
Dallas (1916-1954)

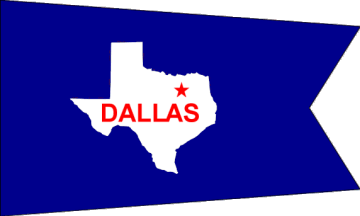
Dallas (1954-1967)

Dayton (1917–1958)

Dayton (1958–2021)

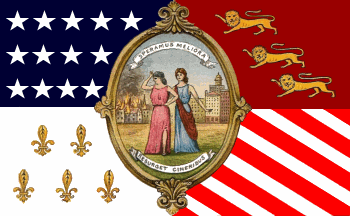
Detroit (1948–1974)

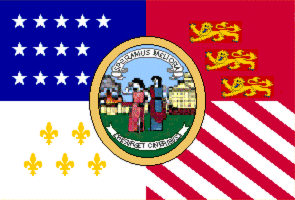
Detroit (1974-1976)

Detroit (1976-2000)

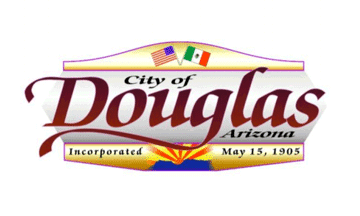
Douglas (1981–2016)

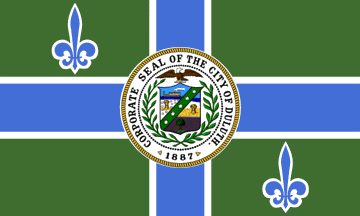
Duluth (1979–2019)

Fall River (1988–2018)

Gilbert (–2017)

Glendale (1979–1990)

Indianapolis (1911-1915)

Indianapolis (1915-1963)

Jacksonville (1914-1976)

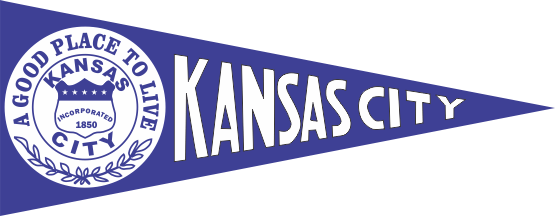
Kansas City (1913–1936)

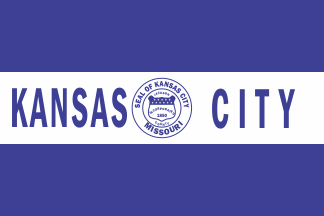
Kansas City (1936–1944)

Kansas City (1944–1972)

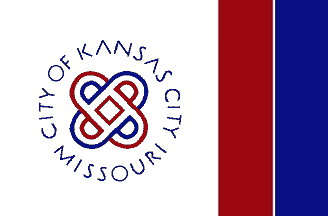
Kansas City (1972–1992)

Kansas City (1992–1995)

Kansas City (1995–2023)

Las Vegas (until 1968)

Louisville (1934-2003)

Madison, Wisconsin (1962–2018)

Marana (2013–2021)

Maricopa (2008–2017)

Memphis (1963-1969)

Mesa (–2005)

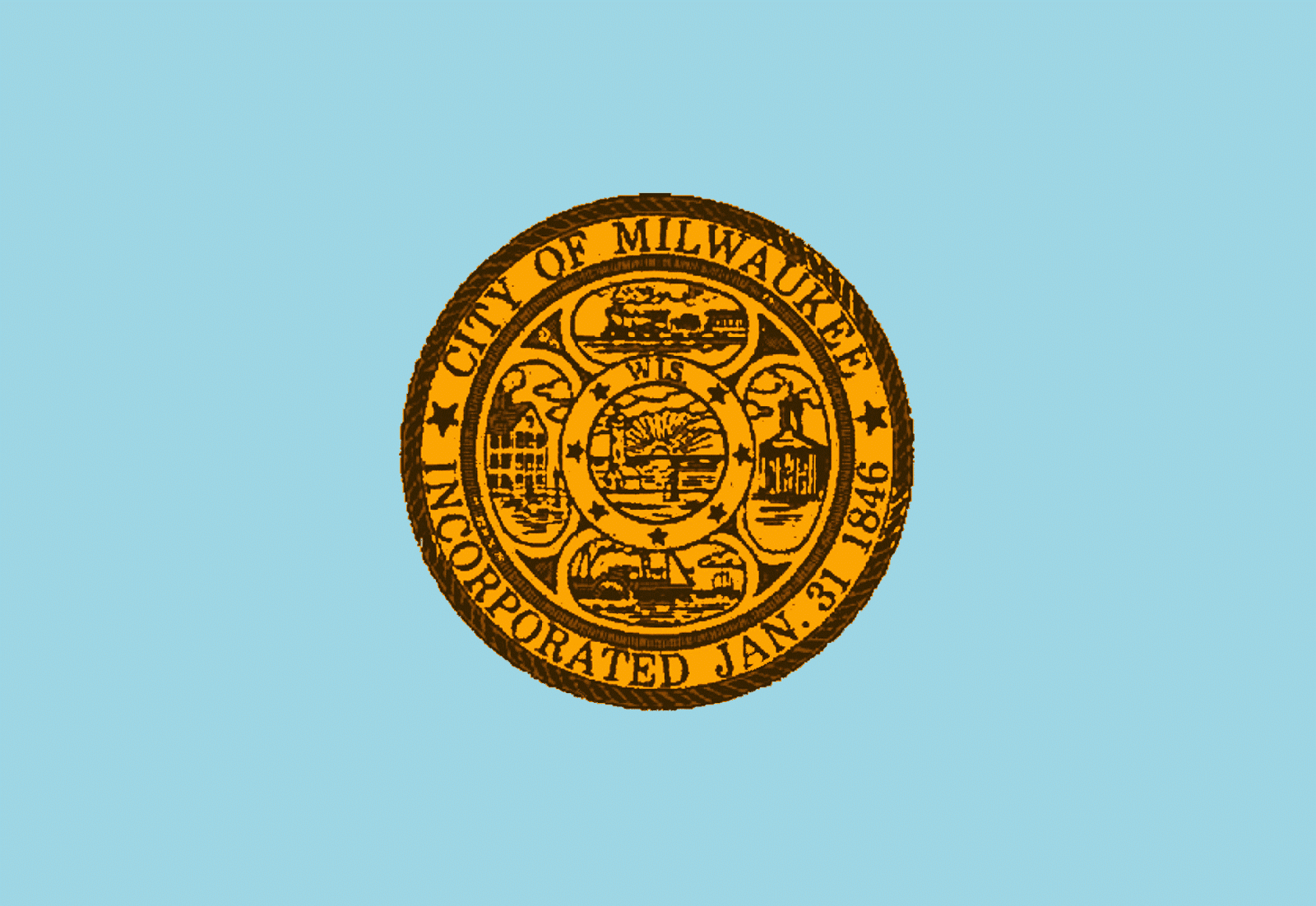
Milwaukee (1927)

Montgomery (1952–2026)

Montpelier (2000–2017)

Nashville (1961-1964)

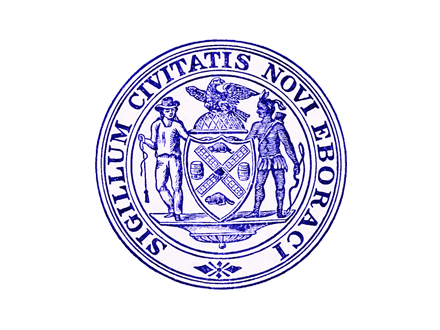
New York City (1914-1915)

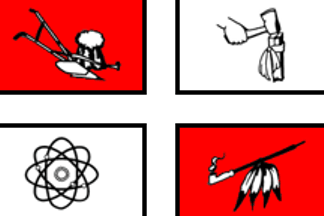
Oklahoma City (1965-1994)

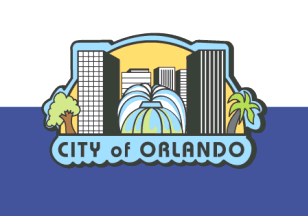
Orlando (1980–2017)

Ozark (1999–2024)

Peoria (1954–2017)

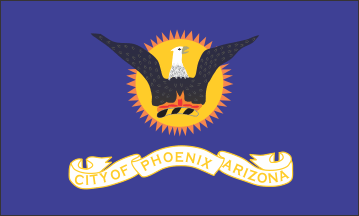
Phoenix (1921-1990)

Portland (1970-2002)

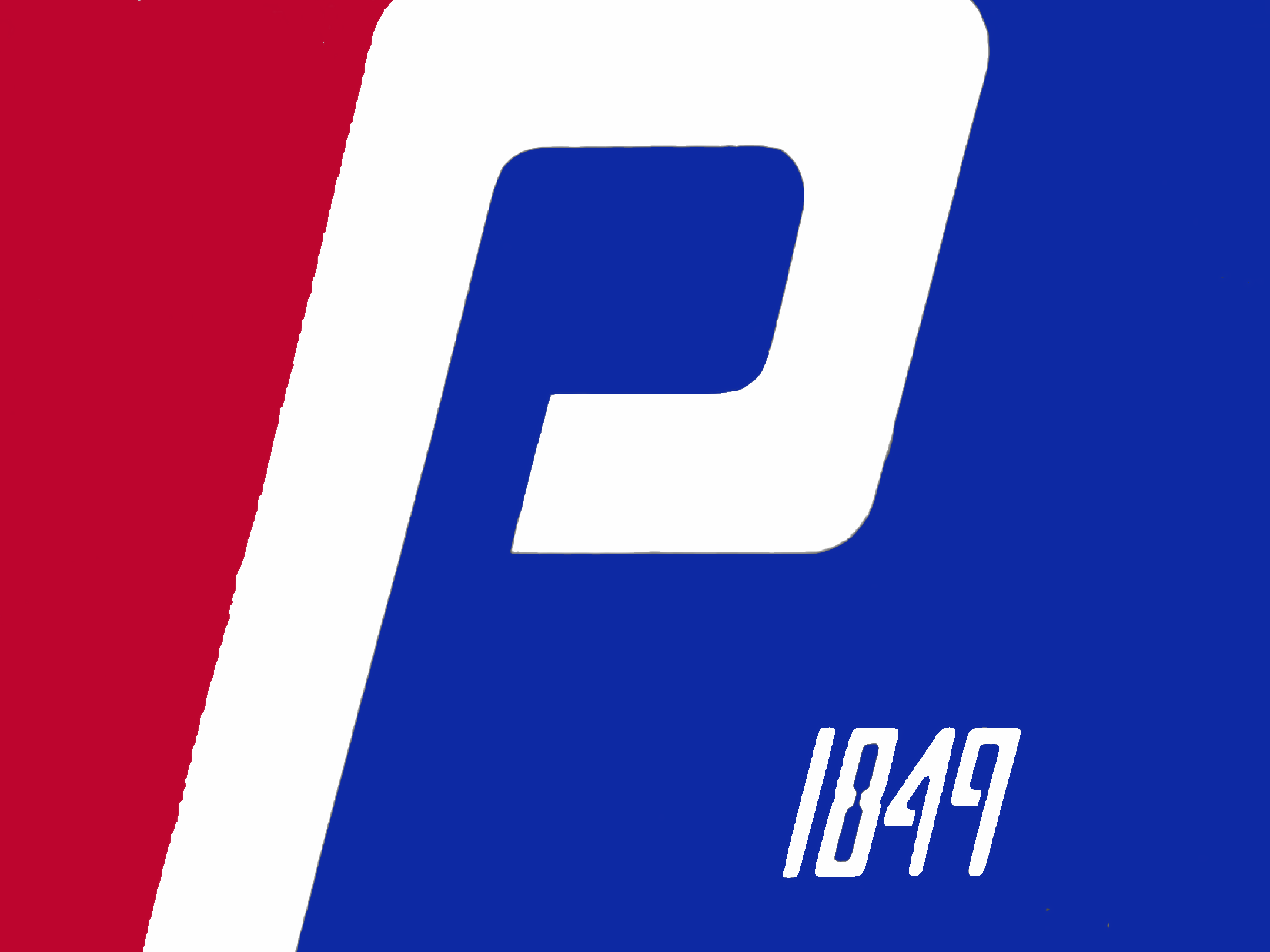
Provo (1976–1989)

Provo (1989–2015)

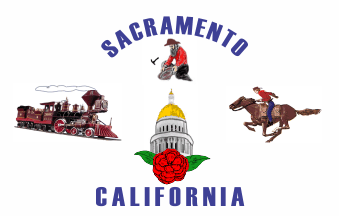
Sacramento (1964-1989)

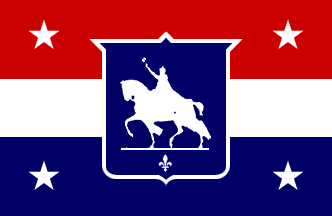
St. Louis (1946-1964)

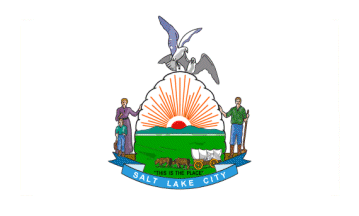
Salt Lake City (1969-2006)

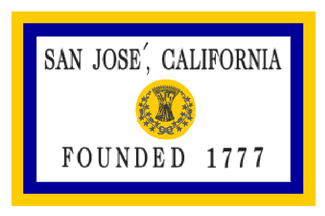
San Jose (1969-1984)

San Francisco (1900-1940)

Seattle (1943-1963)

South Bend (1965–2016)

Spokane (1912-1958)

Spokane (1975-2021)

Springfield (1938-2022)

Star Valley (2011-2017)

Surprise (2001-2014)

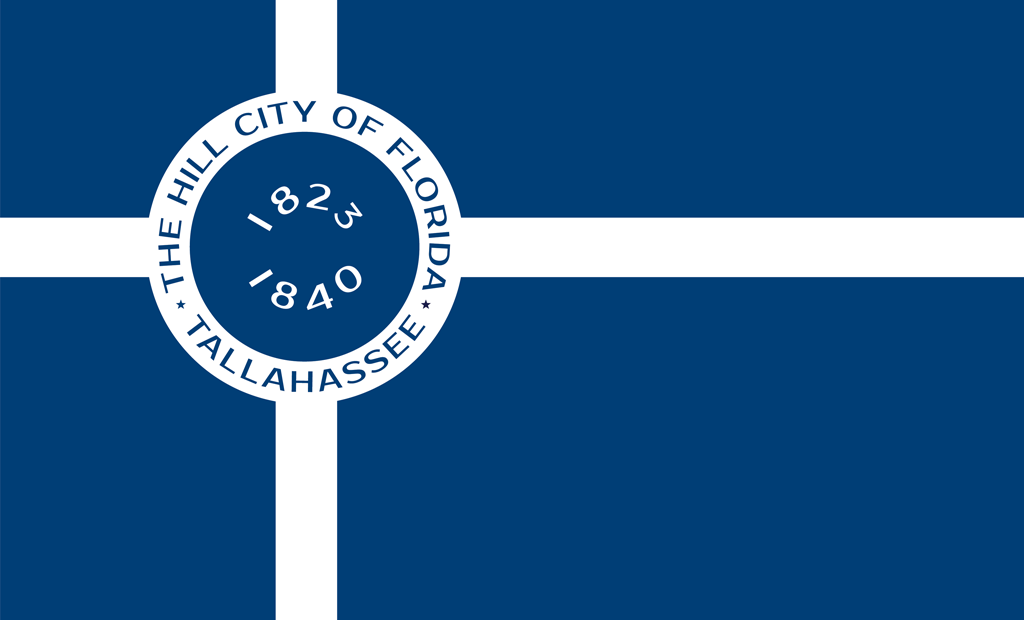
Tallahassee (1916–1920s)

Tallahassee (1955–1986)

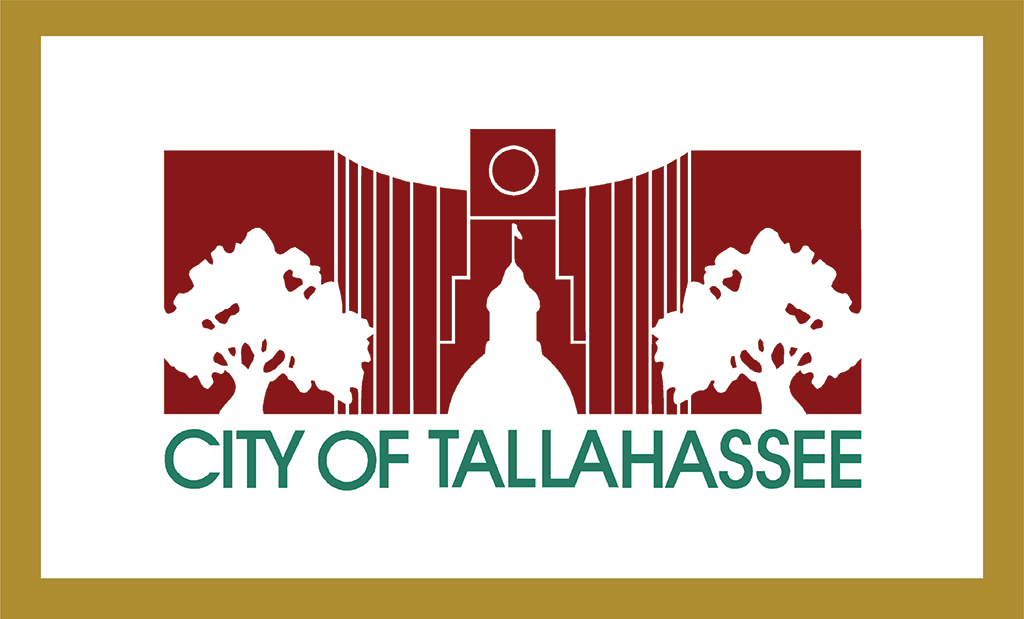
Tallahassee (1986–2002)

Tallahassee (2002–2020)

Tempe (1971–1987)

Tempe (1987–2017)

Toledo (1909–1994)

Toledo (1994–2025)

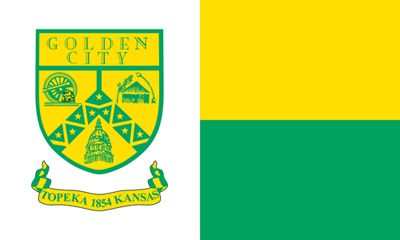
Topeka (1977–2019)

Tulsa (1924-1941)

Tulsa (1941-1973)

Tulsa (1973-2018)

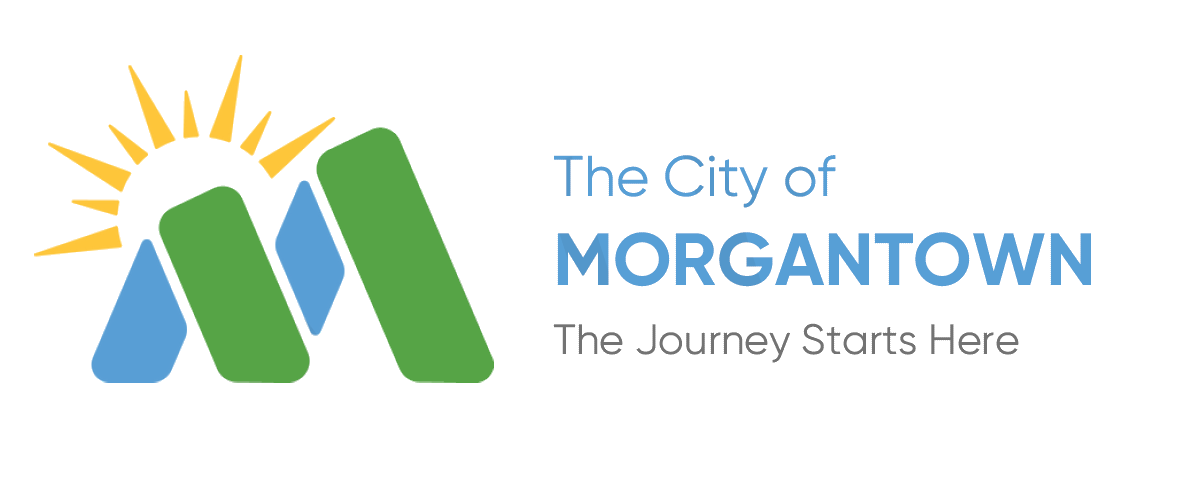
Flag of Morgantown, West Virginia

Wheeling (1968–2018)

Wickenburg (2010–2022)

Winslow (1991–2018)

== See also ==
- List of city flags in Africa
- List of city flags in Asia
- List of city flags in Europe
- List of city flags in Oceania
- List of city flags in South America
