= 3 February Hydroelectric Dam =

Dam and hydroelectric power plant in El Salvador

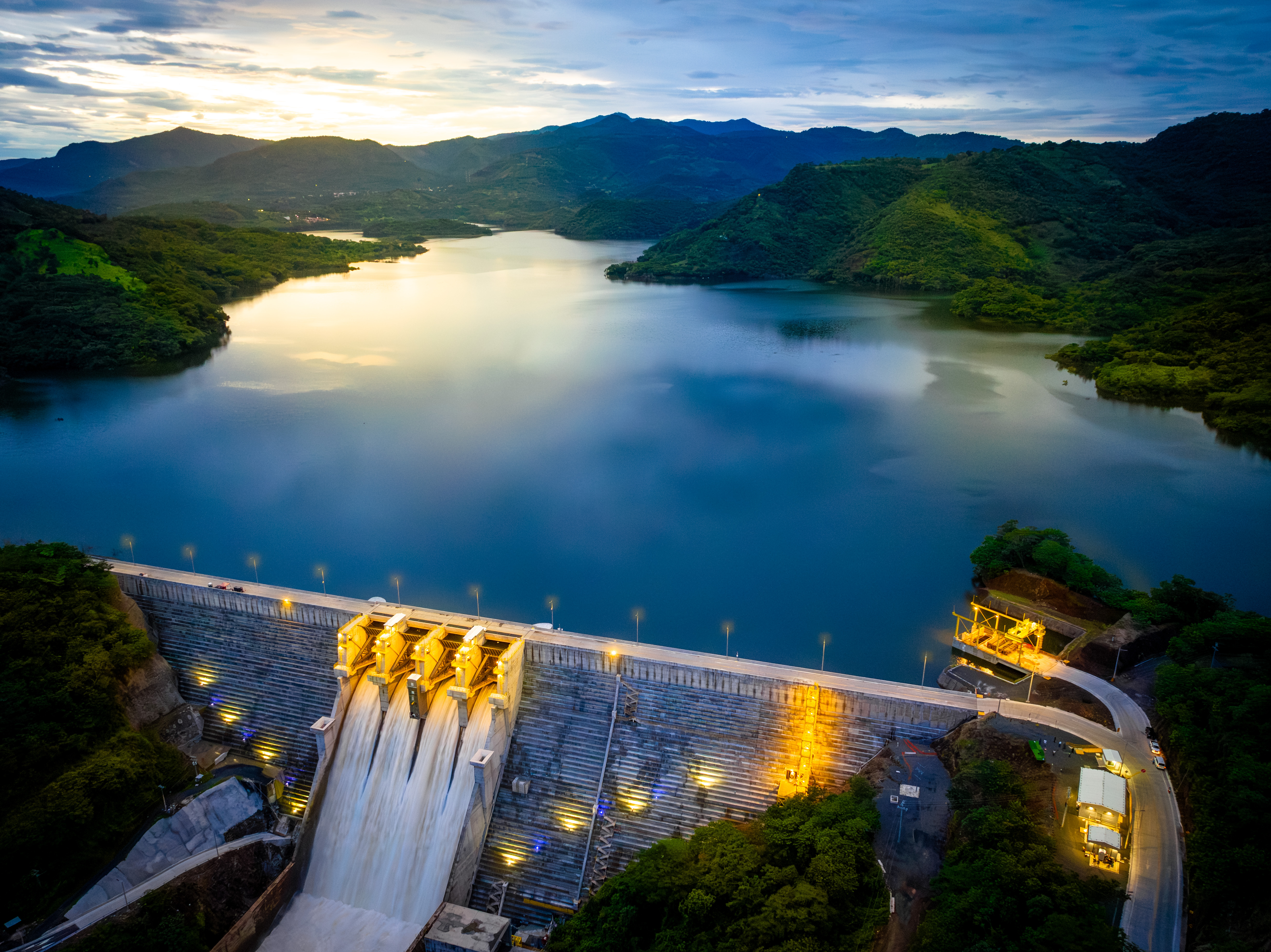
- Interactive map of 3 February Hydroelectric Dam
- Country: El Salvador
- Location: San Luis de la Reina
- Coordinates: 13°51′45.6″N 88°21′03.5″W
- Status: Operational
- Construction began: 2008
- Opening date: 19 October 2023
- Construction cost: US$800 million
- Built by: Astaldi
- Owner: Government of El Salvador

Dam and spillways
- Impounds: Torola River

Power Station
- Installed capacity: 67 MW

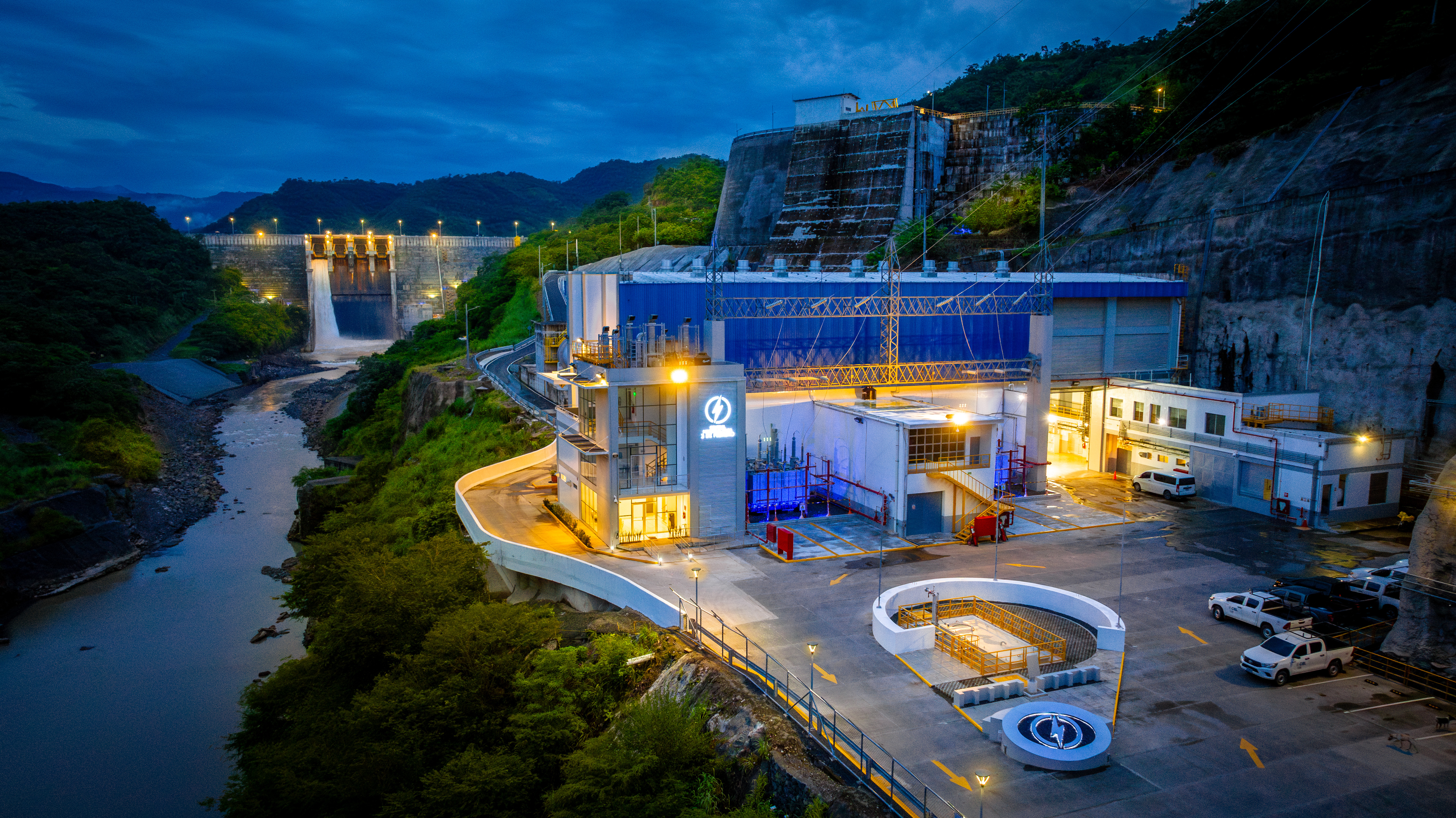
A view of the dam and power plant

The 3 February Hydroelectric Dam (Spanish: Central Hidroeléctrica 3 de Febrero), also known as El Chaparral, is a dam and hydroelectric power plant located in San Luis de la Reina, San Miguel, El Salvador.

== History ==
In 1998, the Salvadoran government initiated surveys to construct the dam and hydroelectric power plant. Construction began in 2008, and the Italian company Astaldi was contracted to build the dam. Construction was suspended in 2010 when Astaldi stated that there were problems at the location where the dam was being built. In 2020, the Salvadoran government presented evidence against former President Mauricio Funes and other government officials accusing them of money laundering and embezzlement regarding the construction project.

Construction resumed in August 2019 during presidency of Nayib Bukele, who had previously described the project as "monument to corruption" ("monumento a la corrupción"). In August 2020, Bukele announced that the dam would be renamed from the El Chaparral Dam to the 3 February Dam, in reference to 3 February 2019, the date that Bukele was elected as president of El Salvador. Construction was completed in October 2022.

On 19 October 2023, Bukele inaugurated the dam and power plant. Bukele explained that the inauguration was delayed to allow the reservoir to be filled with water. During the inauguration, Bukele stated that the dam would reduce electricity prices by 14 percent.

== Specifications ==
The dam's power plant has an installed capacity of 67 megawatts. It cost US$800 million to build.

== Environmental impact ==
Environmentalists have warned that the dam's construction could endanger more than 60 species living near the project.

== See also ==
- Cerrón Grande Dam
