= Carolina Bridge =

New bridge inaugurated by the president Nayib Bukele in San Miguel, El Salvador

The Carolina Bridge is a cable-stayed road structure located over the Torola River in the department of San Miguel, El Salvador. It is the second bridge of its kind built in the country and stands out for its modern architectural design. The project was financed with the Government of El Salvador's own funds, with a total investment of 12.6 million U.S. dollars, and is part of an infrastructure plan aimed at improving regional connectivity, boosting the local economy, and enhancing the quality of life for the residents of municipalities such as Carolina, San Antonio, San Luis de la Reina, and Torola.

The bridge was inaugurated for public use on 12 August 2025 by El Salvador's president, Nayib Bukele. He had also been present in February 2022, for the ceremonial start of construction.

== Technical features ==
The bridge has a total length of 179.8 meters and a width of 13 meters, distributed into an 8-meter-wide two-lane roadway and two lateral pedestrian sidewalks, each 92 centimeters wide. The structure features pylons 92.4 meters high and a total of 21 segments. The cable system reaches a cumulative length of 69.25 kilometers, allowing for a load capacity of up to 40 tons, with a resistance test performed at 150 tons.

The design load complies with the international HL93 standard used for high-capacity bridges. Its construction required 4,371.6 cubic meters of concrete and 608.9 tons of steel. The height above the Torola River bed is 24.0 meters from the reservoir's minimum level and 8.0 meters from its maximum level.
