= Cantón El Tablón =

Flooded locality in El Salvador

Coordinates: 13°56′35″N 89°00′00″W

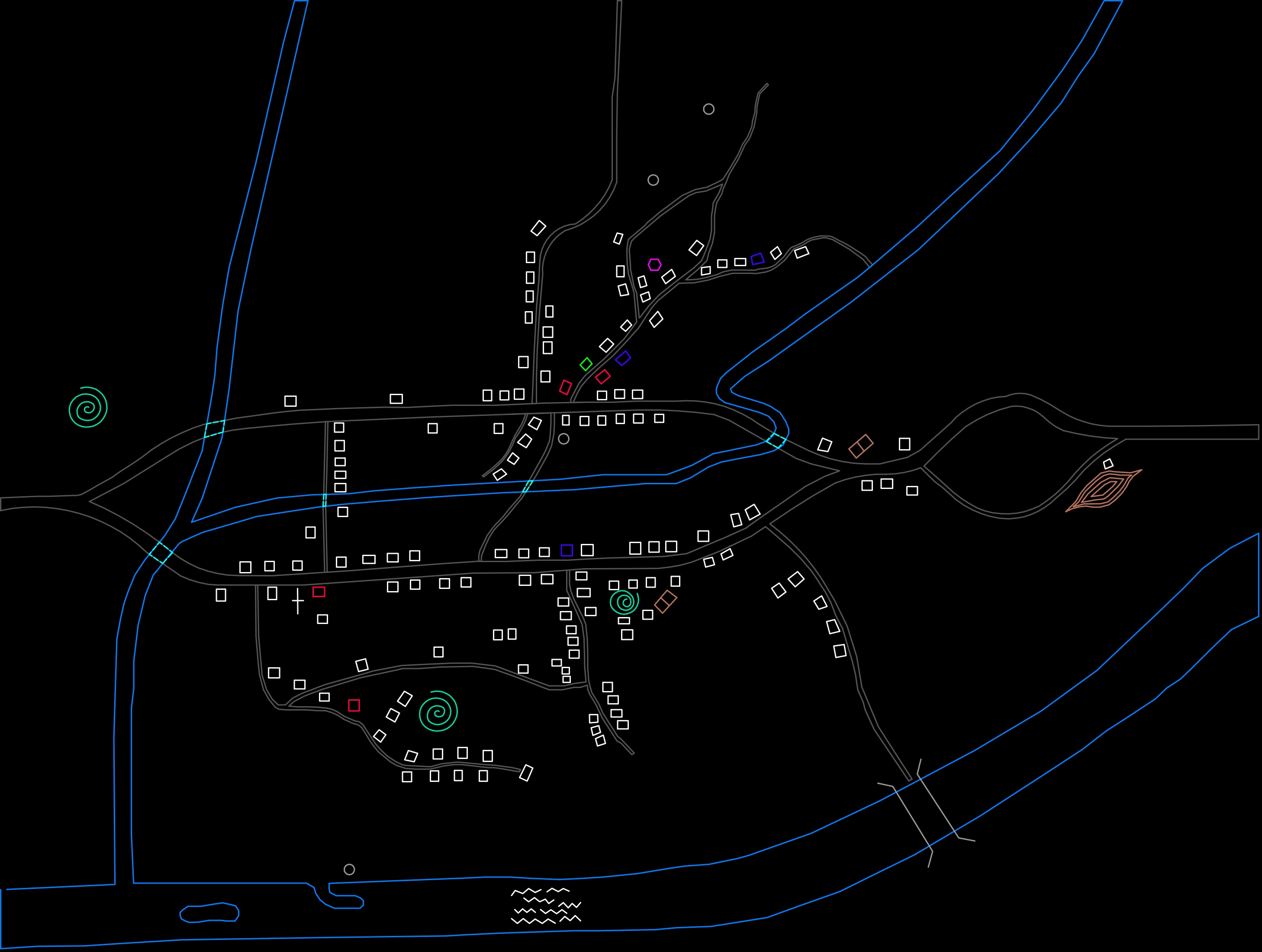
A map of the former locality

Cantón El Tablón belonged to the municipality of Suchitoto, Cuscatlán, El Salvador. Cantón El Tablón was one of many cantons in the surrounding area that was flooded as a result of the Cerrón Grande Hydroelectric Dam built in El Salvador between 1973 and 1976 that created the artificial Cerrón Grande Reservoir. According to former residents of El Tablón, the area was divided up into four main caseríos: Caserío La Hacienda Vieja, Caserío Los Figueroas, Caserío Valle El Tablón, and Caserío Los Palitos. It is unclear where the name El Tablón originated from, but according to local historians, a village named "El Tablón" existed prior to 1860 that was formed through a municipal ejido. An ejido was commonly owned municipal land granted by the Spanish Crown to governing bodies in the Spanish Empire. These lands were considered vacant or unused land in some cases belonging to existing indigenous communities.

== History ==
=== Barca of Río Lempa ===
According to various first-hand accounts, the Barca del Río Lempa was a boating transportation system that would transport people and goods across the Lempa River between the departments of Cuscatlán and Chalatenango. In previous decades, the shortest way to go from Chalatenango to the capital city of San Salvador, residents would use the San Francisco Lempa road that would take them to the Lempa River where they would cross from Canton Los Zepedas, in the municipality of San Francisco Lempa, Chalatenango to Canton El Tablón, in the municipality of Suchitoto, Cuscatlán. The location of the boat crossing was about 13 kilometers from the city of Chalatenango, in the Department with the same name, and about 10 kilometers northeast of the city of Suchitoto, Cuscatlán.

In the early 20th century, a large number of people were transported across the Lempa River on a daily basis. It became an essential part of the local economy and the tourism industry of both departments. As a result of this high usage, the departmental governments of Chalatenango and Cuscatlán agreed to build a suspension bridge named Cayetano Bosque that was destroyed by a severe storm in 1934. That same year, the municipality of San Francisco Lempa decided to build a boat that would be able to transport people and good across the Lempa River as the demand was still very high. That first boat was named Tablón Cayetano Bosque. It was used to not only transport people and goods but also vehicles such as local buses that traveled between the city of Chalatenango and the city of San Salvador. The initiative to build and use these boats as transportation was headed by Don Teodulo Zepeda, son of General Juan Orlando Zepeda. Don Teodulo Zepeda became the administrator of the first boat. These boats were built of wood with a lifespan of at least five years. According to some former users of the transportation system, the boat was susceptible to sinking when there was too much weight on top and would occur most often when transporting buses. To address this issue, the boat was attached to a cable above the boat that crossed the river and was attached to the shorelines. At some point after the construction of the Tablón Cayetano Bosque bridge, another bridge was built across the Lempa River known by locals as Puente Remolino that was also destroyed not long after its construction by another severe storm. These bridges were never rebuilt and so the Barca del Río Lempa continued to be of great use for local residents of the area until 1976 when the Cerrón Grande Hydroelectric Dam was fully built and the lands surround the river in the Paraiso Basin were flooded.

=== Diaspora, internal displacement, and the construction of the Cerrón Grande Hydroelectric Dam ===
What is known today as the Cerrón Grande Reservoir, or Lake Suchitlán, a man-made lake, was formed in the mid-1970s as a result of the Cerrón Grande Hydroelectric Dam construction. It was named Lake Suchitlán by Alejandro Coto after municipality of Suchitoto and the department of Cuscatlán. It was a project initiated by the national government of El Salvador to produce hydro electricity for the country. As a result of the flooding associated with the project, 13,339 people were internally displaced from their family homes and lands in the Paraiso Basin of El Salvador, with around 9,000 people relocating to other communities and the rest receiving a small lump sum of money for their properties. The project affected four departments: Chalatenango, Cuscatlán, San Salvador, and Cabañas, with the department of Chalatenango seeing the most municipalities affected including Tejutla, El Paraíso, San Rafael, Santa Rita, Chalatenango, Azacualpa, San Francisco Lempa, San Luis del Carmen, and Potonico; San Salvador seeing the municipality of El Paisnal affected, and Cuscatlán seeing the municipality of Suchitoto affected.

The project was initiated on 4 August 1972 by the newly elected government of former President Arturo Armando Molina who had discussed the project as part of his government's platform. The project was to create a dam on the Lempa River where two Francis turbines, with a capacity to produce 67.5 MW each, would be constructed as additions to the two turbine system already built on the Guajoyo River and the Lempa River. The project was advertised as the best resource for the country's energy problem, and was to be built 22 kilometers upstream from the dam on the Lempa River, between the municipality of Potonico, Chalatenango and Jutiapa, Cabañas. As a result of this construction, 2,180 million cubic meters of water flooded an area of around 13,500 hectares of land and formed the 135 kilometers squared artificial lake called Lake Suchitlán. As a result of the lake, over 24 archaeological sites were flooded and multiple cantons and caseríos disappeared. In Suchitoto, only two cantons disappeared: Canton El Tablón and Canton San Juan.

The displacement of such a huge population had severe effects on the way of life for thousands of Salvadorans. In Canton El Tablón, there was a population of an estimated 2000 people at the time of the llena, meaning "filling", as described by former residents of the affected areas. The lleno refers to the filling of water or flooding of the Basin. Many displaced peoples from the cantons in Chalatenango, were relocated by the national government to three newly built reurbanicaciones, or "residential communities". These reurbanicaciones are located in the department of Chalatenango and are called Reurbanicación Núcleo #1 "Areneros", Reurbanicación Núcleo #2, and Reurbanicación Núcleo #3.

== Geography ==
El Tablón was located adjacent to the Lempa River and had a stream and a seasonal river crossing through the area named Quebrada El Pacun and the Tacanagua River.
