= Nuevo Edén de San Juan =

- District
- Location in El Salvador
- Coordinates: 13°49′N 88°29′W
- Country: El Salvador
- Department: San Miguel Department

Area
  - District: 24.4 sq mi (63.1 km^{2})
- Elevation: 407 ft (124 m)

Population (2024)
  - District: 3,791
  - Rank: 218th in El Salvador
  - Rural: 3,791

Nuevo Edén de San Juan is a municipality in the San Miguel department of El Salvador.

It is a small town of 1,500 people in the northern part of El Salvador. It is the former home to Santana Vasquez.

== Geography ==
It is bordered by the following municipalities: the north by the Republic of Honduras, to the east, San Gerardo, on the south by Sesori the west by the municipality of Dolores. The municipality is divided administratively into 7 cantons and 53 villages. The seat municipal seat of Edén de San Juan, is located 800 meters above sea level, and lies 50.6 km northwest of San Miguel, El Salvador.

The area of the township is 63.1 square kilometers and it has a population of 3020 inhabitants. The municipality's climate is warm and the total annual rainfall varies between 1,600 and 1,800 milliliters.

The vegetation consists of subtropical rainforest. The most notable tree species are: cognac, laurel, Jicaro, quebracho, and fruit.

The soil types that are in the town are litosols and red clay, with rocky surfaces around the rugged mountains.

== Economy ==
=== Production and trade ===
Agricultural products grown more in the municipality are: basic grains, sesame, vegetables and fruits. In the area there is livestock rearing of cattle and pigs, and poultry farming, beekeeping and fisheries.

The town's main industry is the development of pottery and dairy products. Business is done with the municipalities of San Gerardo, San Luis de La Reina, Sesorí and others.

The town of Nuevo Edén de San Juan is joined by paved road to the town of San Gerardo and the city of El Triunfo, in the Usulután Department. By bridge it communicates with the town of Dolores.

=== Tourism ===
In the town, there are sites which are tourist attractions: La Cascada El Salto and Poza La Bruja.

== Culture ==
=== Festivities ===
The festivities celebrating the patron of San Juan are held on June 23 and 24.
