= Acelhuate River =

River in El Salvador

- Río Acelhuate (Spanish)
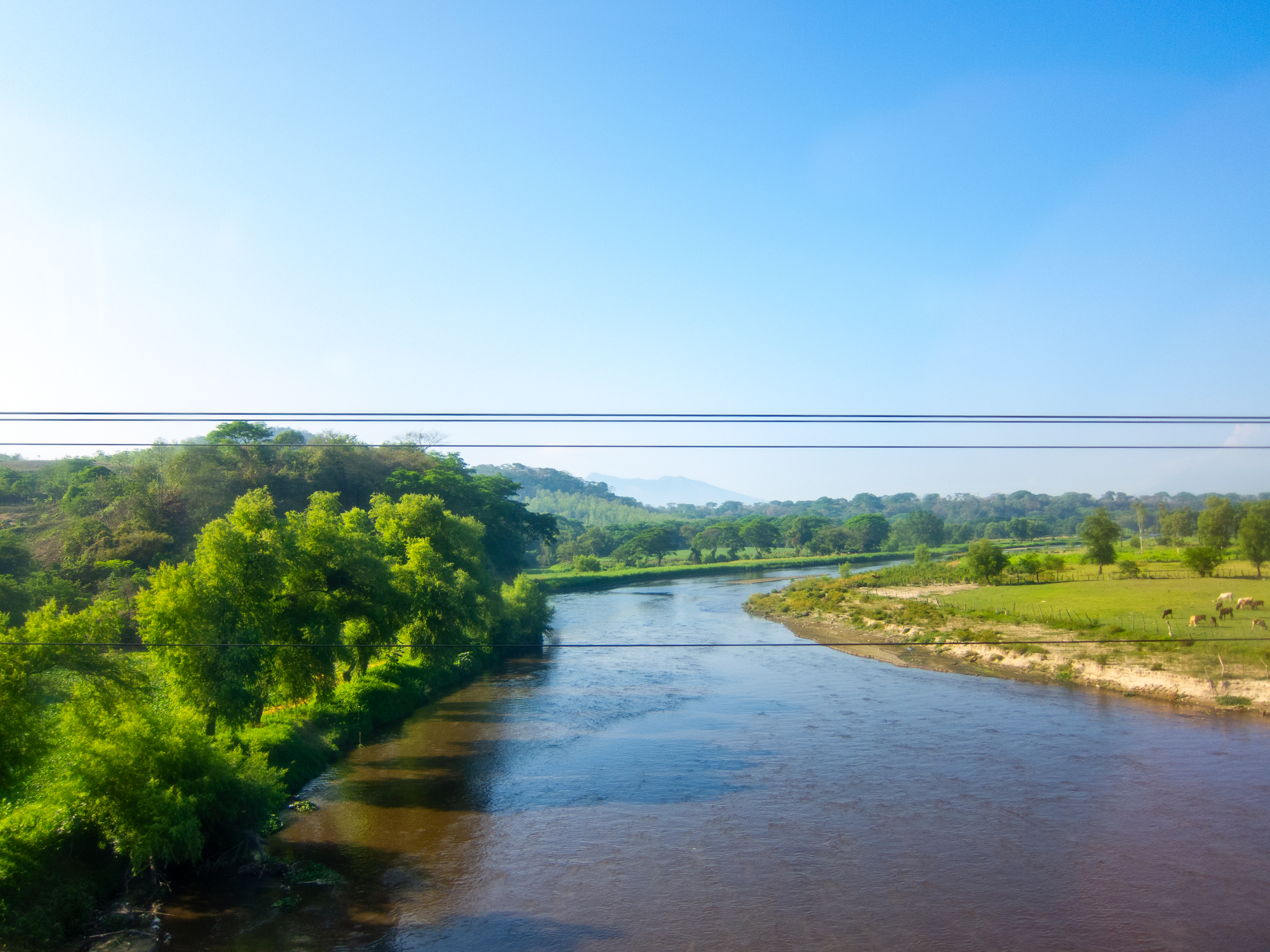
- The Acelhuate River near its mouth as seen from the Carretera Troncal del Norte

- Location within El Salvador
- Interactive map of Acelhuate River
- Location: El Salvador
- Coordinates: 14°04′N 89°08′W
- Type: River
- Primary outflows: Lempa River
- Catchment area: 414 sq mi (1,070 km^{2})
- Max. length: 37 mi (60 km)
- Settlements: San Salvador

The Acelhuate River (Spanish: Río Acelhuate) is a river in El Salvador which originates in the San Salvador Department and flows north into the Lempa River and the Cerrón Grande Reservoir. The city of San Salvador was established along the river in the mid-1500s for its clear waters, but it has since become one of El Salvador's most polluted rivers due to improper waste disposal from San Salvador beginning in the mid-1900s. Despite the river's high levels of contamination by domestic and industrial waste, several animal species continue to inhabit the river and around 1.7 million people live in the river's drainage basin.

== Etymology ==
The name "Acelhuate" derives from the Nawat spelling "Axolhuatl". The Nawat name is a combination of the words "axol", a type of flower, and "huatl" meaning "place".

== Course ==
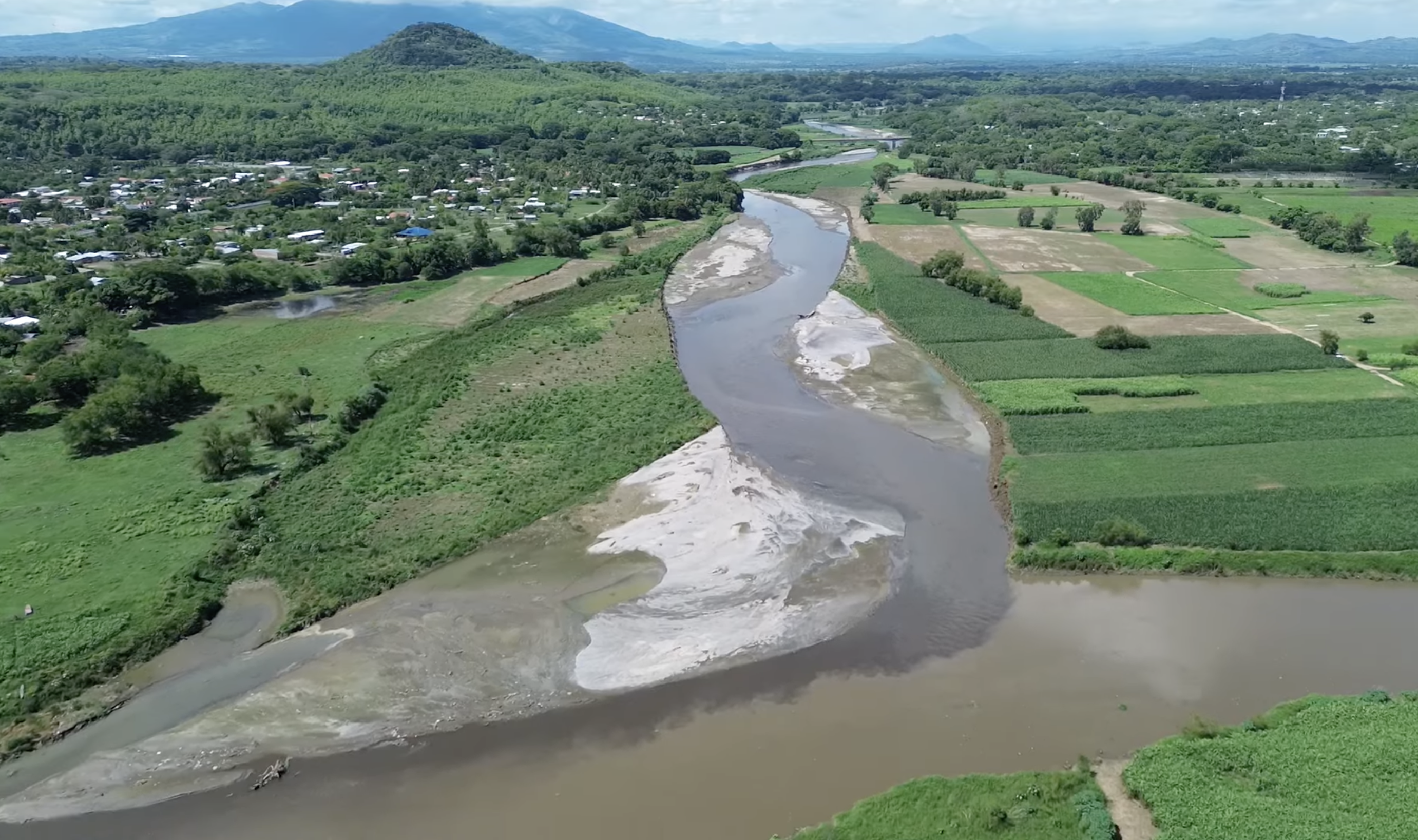
The mouth of the Acelhuate River as it empties into the Lempa River

The Acelhuate River originates in western San Salvador Department and flows north through the city of San Salvador, El Salvador's capital city. The river runs through the center of the San Salvador Department and along part of the northwestern border of the Cuscatlán Department. As a part of the Lempa River basin, the Acelhuate River ends at the Lempa River (the country's largest river) and the Cerrón Grande Reservoir in north-central El Salvador.

The Acelhuate River has a drainage basin of 414 sq mi (1,070 km^{2}), covering 5.1 percent of the country's land area, and is 37 miles (60 km) long. Several rivers flow into it, including the El Piro, Las Cañas, Sumpa, and Tomayate Rivers.

== History ==
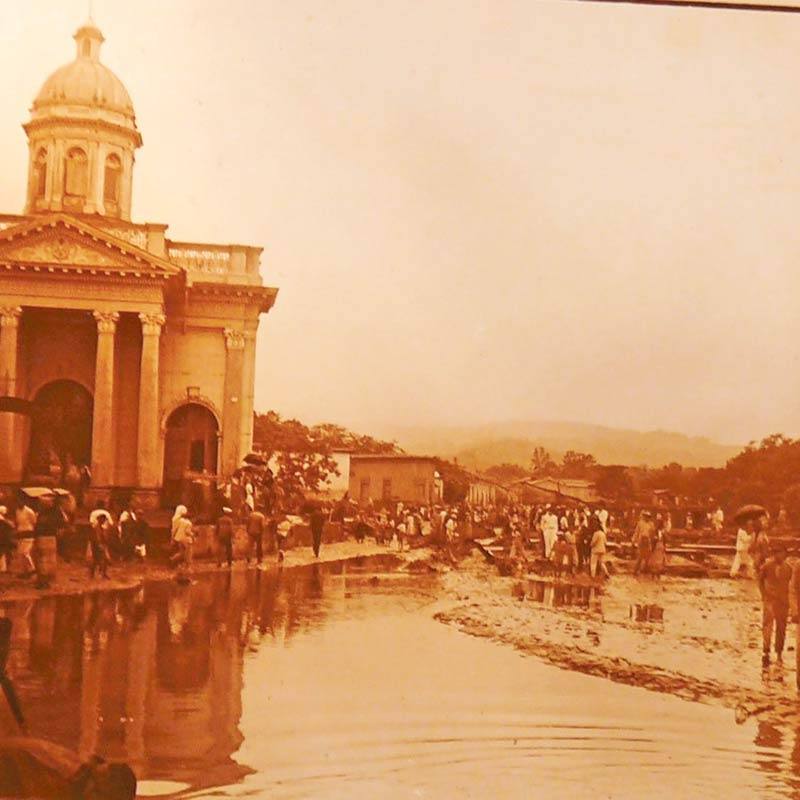
Flooding in San Salvador in 1922 after the Acelhuate River overflowed

Between 900 and 1200, the Acelhuate River basin was inhabited by the Pipil. The Pipil abandoned the area around 1200 due to fighting with other Salvadoran indigenous groups.

On 27 September 1546, the Spanish colonial city of San Salvador (originally founded in 1525) was reestablished along the Acelhuate River due to the river and its various tributaries providing the city an abundance of fresh water. At the time, the river's water was clear and suitable to grow crops around. In 1576, an oidor (judge) of San Salvador wrote to Spanish king Philip II describing the river's water as "very good and clear and without bad taste" ("muy buena y clara y sin ningún mal sabor"). In 1820, San Salvador council member Mariano Francisco Gómez reported to the Spanish parliament that the city's residents bathed in the river's waters and caught fish, mollusks, pearls, tortoiseshell, and murex.

On 12 June 1922, heavy rains caused the Acelhuate River to overflow in parts of San Salvador and Colón. The floods killed hundreds of people, destroyed buildings, blocked roads, and caused landslides. During La Matanza, a series of Salvadoran government mass killings in early 1932, the Directorate General of Police executed hundreds communist and Pipil rebels and buried them in mass graves along the Acelhuate River. On 3 July 2008, 30 people were killed when a bus fell into the Acelhuate River during a storm; those killed were members of the Misión Cristiana Elim Internacional church.

As of 2018, around 1.7 million people in 19 districts live in the Acelhuate River's drainage basin.

== Contamination ==
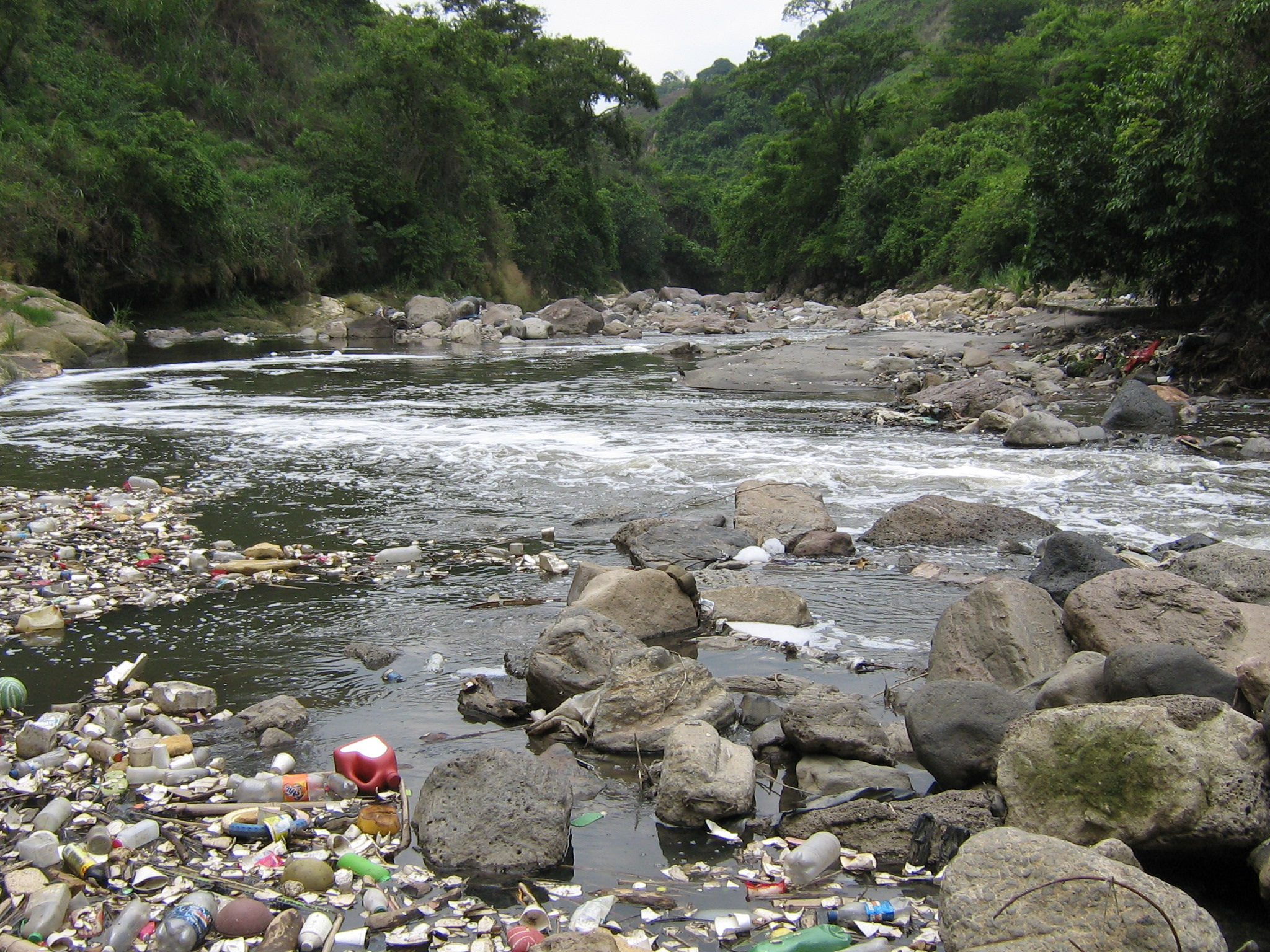
Garbage along the Acelhuate River near Ciudad Delgado

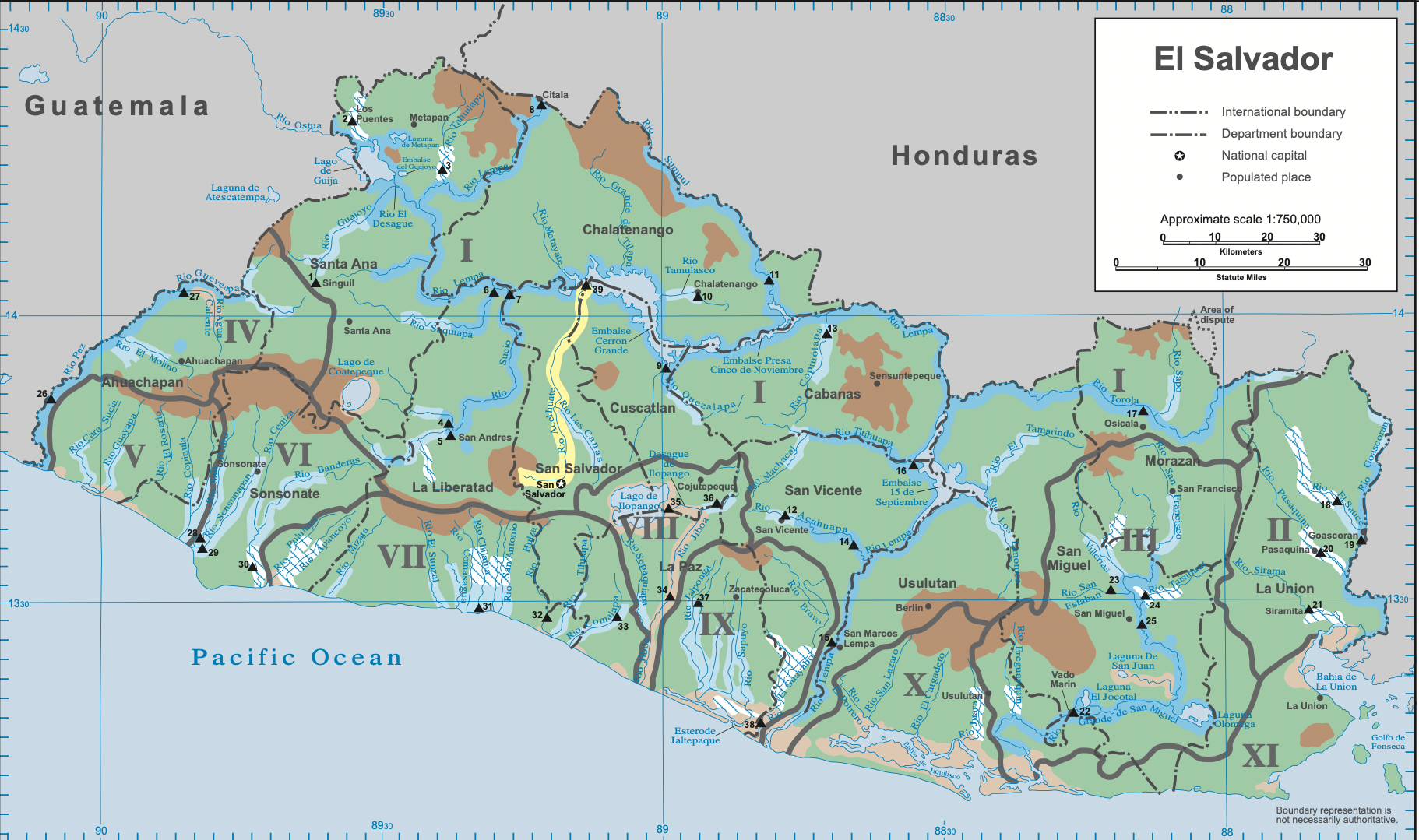
A U.S. Army Corps of Engineers map of El Salvador's surface water resources; the Acelhuate River is highlighted in yellow signifying "highly contaminated water".

The Acelhuate River is one the most contaminated and polluted rivers in El Salvador. The river functions as a drainage for untreated domestic and industrial waste improperly disposed from San Salvador which flows into the Cerrón Grande Reservoir in north-central El Salvador, polluting that body of water in the process. A 2015 Salvadoran government survey estimated that domestic waste composed 62 percent of pollutants in the river, industrial waste composed 32 percent, and garbage dumped in the river or caught by rainfall composed the remaining 6 percent. Industrial materials such as iron, arsenic, lead, mercury, and zinc are dumped into the river by factories. During El Salvador's dry season (November to April), the river is almost entirely composed of sewage. In 1999, up to 1,600 tons of sewage were dumped into the Acelhuate River every day.

According to Salvadoran government documents, the Acelhuate River began to experience high levels of pollution of contamination during the mid-1900s. A 1979 study of the Acelhuate River conducted by the Ministry of Agriculture and Livestock and the Land Resources Development Center of the Overseas Development Administration of Great Britain described the pollution as "chronic" ("crónica") and as posing a health hazard to people living near the river. The Acelhuate River is one of five rivers labeled by the Ministry of the Environment and Natural Resources as having a water quality bad enough to inhibit the development of aquatic life and pose a danger to humans. El Diario de Hoy's Francisco Rubio and Mauro Arias described the Acelhuate River as a "symbol" ("símbolo") of contamination in El Salvador's rivers.

In a 1998 survey of El Salvador's water resources, the United States Army Corps of Engineers described the river's waters as "severely contaminated" and a "biohazard" and recommended that contact with the river water "should be avoided". The survey also concluded that decontaminating the river through reverse osmosis would not be possible due to high levels of organic chemical compounds in the water. These compounds have contaminated wells and aquifers around the river.

=== Decontamination efforts ===
In June 2015, Minister of the Environment and Natural Resources Lina Pohl introduced a plan to decontaminate the Acelhuate River by 80 percent in 10 years through the construction of four wastewater treatment plants and requiring factories to build treatment plants in their facilities. The government sought to turn the banks of the river into a recreational area once the waters were decontaminated, but the plan was scrapped in 2019 as Pohl stated that the treatment plants were too expensive and that the government had failed to provide adequate funding.

In December 2017, the Hydroelectric Executive Commission of the Lempa River (CEL) began analyzing the possibility of using the Acelhuate River's contaminated water to power a biogas electric power plant. On 20 February 2024, the Legislative Assembly of El Salvador approved funding for CEL to construct such a biogas electric power plant on the Acelhuate River near Ciudad Delgado and Cuscatancingo with the assistance of Saudi Arabian investors. On 9 July, the Legislative Assembly voted to reaffirm the funding, with deputy William Soriano remarking that the project would "solve problems caused in the Acelhuate River" ("solventará problemáticas ocasionadas en el río Acelhuate").

== Flora and fauna ==
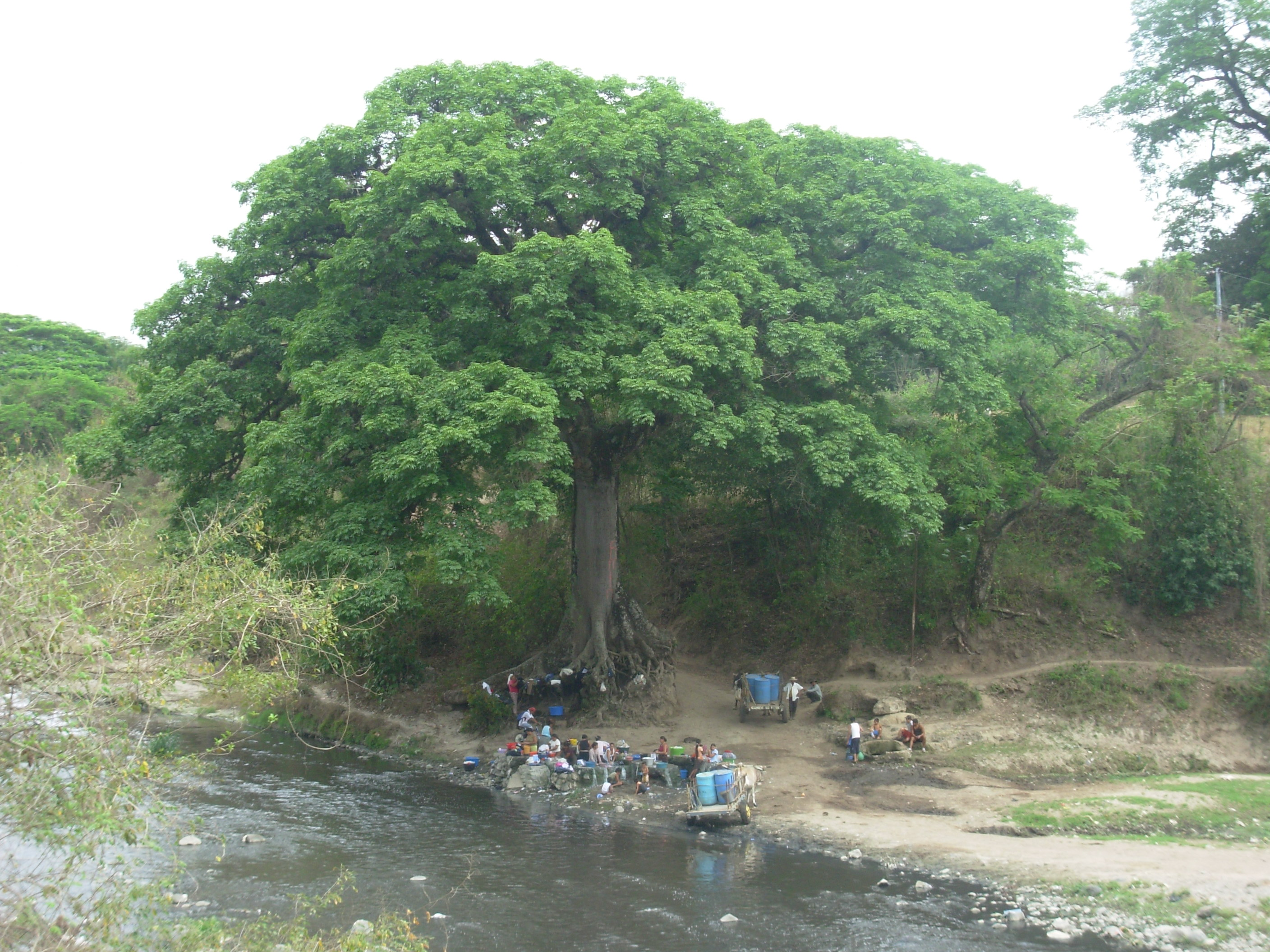
People along the Acelhuate River

Despite the Acelhuate River's contamination, several species of plants and animals continue to inhabit the river and the surrounding areas. The 1979 survey stated that "fish life is non-existent" ("la vida de los peces es inexistente"), but several plant and animal species have since adapted to be able to live in and around the river such as by being able to consume garbage and dead fish.

Several bird species as well as tortoises and some fish inhabit the river. Fishing is possible in some parts of the river, particularly near the mouth of the river where it feeds into the Lempa River and the Cerrón Grande Reservoir. In 2017, non-native crocodiles appeared in the Acelhuate River, which the Ministry of the Environment and Natural Resources believed arrived due to a migration event or due to them being released into the river by a private owner. The axol flower, after which the river is named, can also be found along its banks.

== See also ==
- List of rivers of El Salvador
- List of most-polluted rivers
