= Core Relocations =

Neighborhood of Chalatenango

Core Relocations Reubicación Núcleos
- Neighborhood
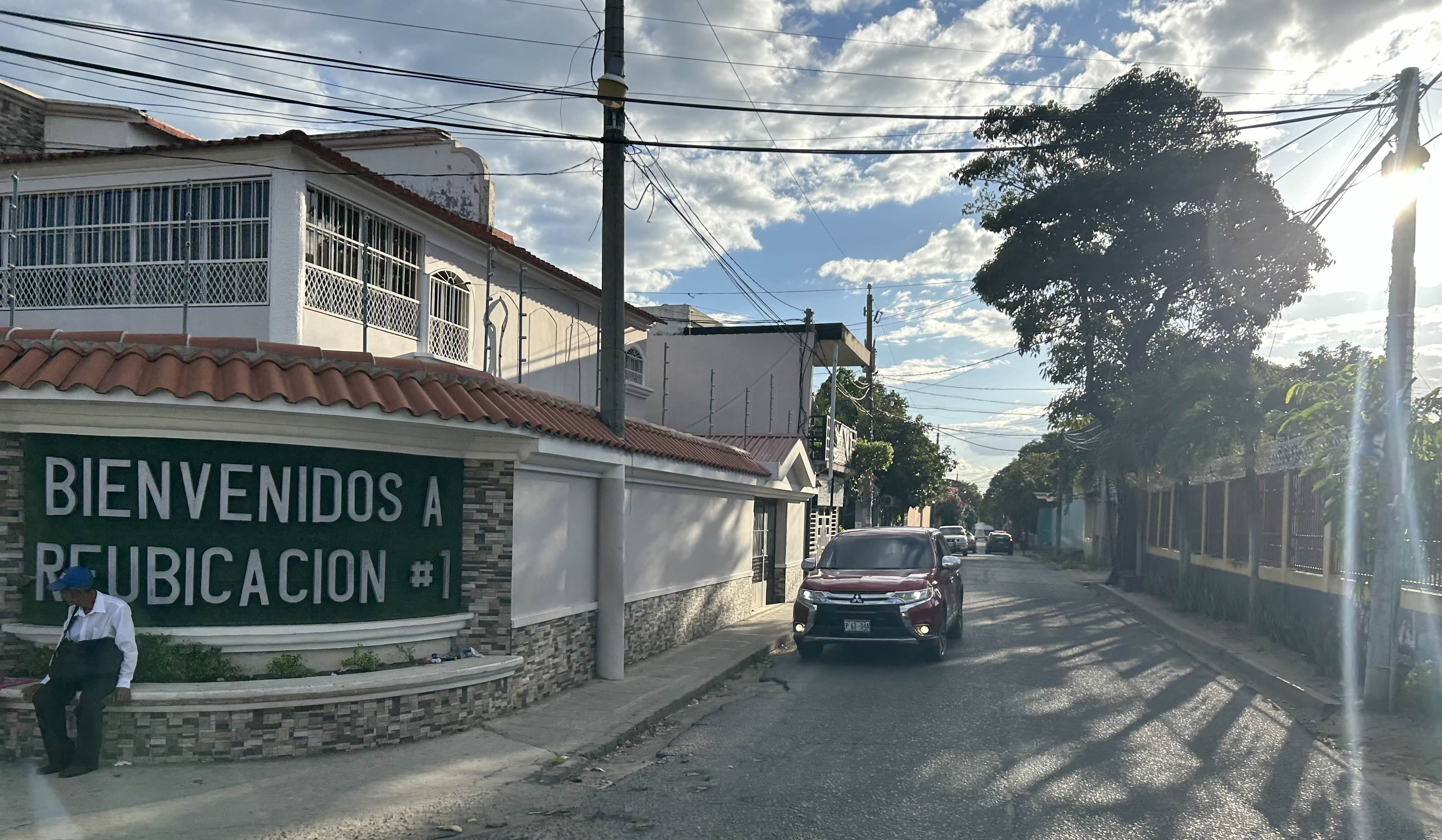
- The entrance of Core Relocation #1

- Location within El Salvador
- Coordinates: 14°03′40″N 89°0′35″W
- Country: El Salvador
- Department: Chalatenango
- Municipality: Chalatenango Centro
- District: Chalatenango
- Established: c. 1973–1975

The Core Relocations (Spanish: Reubicación Núcleos) are a neighborhood composed of three circular settlements located on the outskirts of Chalatenango, El Salvador. The Core Relocations were built by the Salvadoran government during the 1970s to relocate almost 10,000 people displaced by the flooding of the Cerrón Grande Reservoir.

== History ==
From 1973 to 1976, the Salvadoran government flooded 15,000 acres (6,100 ha) of land in northern El Salvador following the completion of the Cerrón Grande Hydroelectric Dam, and the subsequent formation of the Cerrón Grande Reservoir led to the displacement of 10,000 people. Most of these people were relocated to a camp known as El Dorado just north of the reservoir. Located in the municipality (now district) of Chalatenango, the camp eventually turned into the Core Relocation neighborhood divided into three circular settlements known as Core Relocation #1, Core Relocation #2, and Core Relocation #3. In 1975, the Executive Hydroelectric Commission of the Lempa River (CEL) designated Core Relocation #2 as the administrative center of the neighborhood.

In 1992, a bill was proposed in the Legislative Assembly of El Salvador to elevate the neighborhood to the status of a municipality, separating it from Chalatenango. Lawmakers did not act on the proposal, and by 1995, the proposal was abandoned.

== Infrastructure ==
The Core Relocations are located north of the Cerrón Grande Reservoir on the western outskirts of the Chalatenango district. The Motochico River flows between Core Relocation #1 and Core Relocations #2 and #3. The Carretera Longitudinal del Norte runs just north of the three Core Relocations. Core Relocations #1 and #2 are directly connected to the Carretera Longitudinal del Norte, while a road connects Core Relocation #3 to Core Relocation #2. The La Prosperidad bridge crosses the Motochico River; the bridge was destroyed in June 2017 by heavy floods, and a US$2.5 million reconstruction project rebuilt the bridge by October 2018.

The Core Relocations are organized into circular formations. Most of the neighborhood's services, including schools, health clinics, and a museum, are located in Core Relocation #2. Each Core Relocation has a church. Bus route 300 connects the Core Relocations to downtown Chalatenango. The Core Relocations use the postal code 1301.

Core Relocation #1 is nicknamed "Areneros" after one of the cantons submerged by the Cerrón Grande Reservoir's flooding.

== Economy ==
As of 2008, according to José Baltasar Menjívar, the then-vice president of ADESCO (a company located in Core Relocation #3), most residents of the Core Relocations are fishermen, farmers, or ranchers.
