= Cerrón Grande Reservoir =

Reservoir in northern El Salvador

- Lake Suchitlán
- Embalse Cerrón Grande (Spanish); Lago Suchitlán (Spanish)
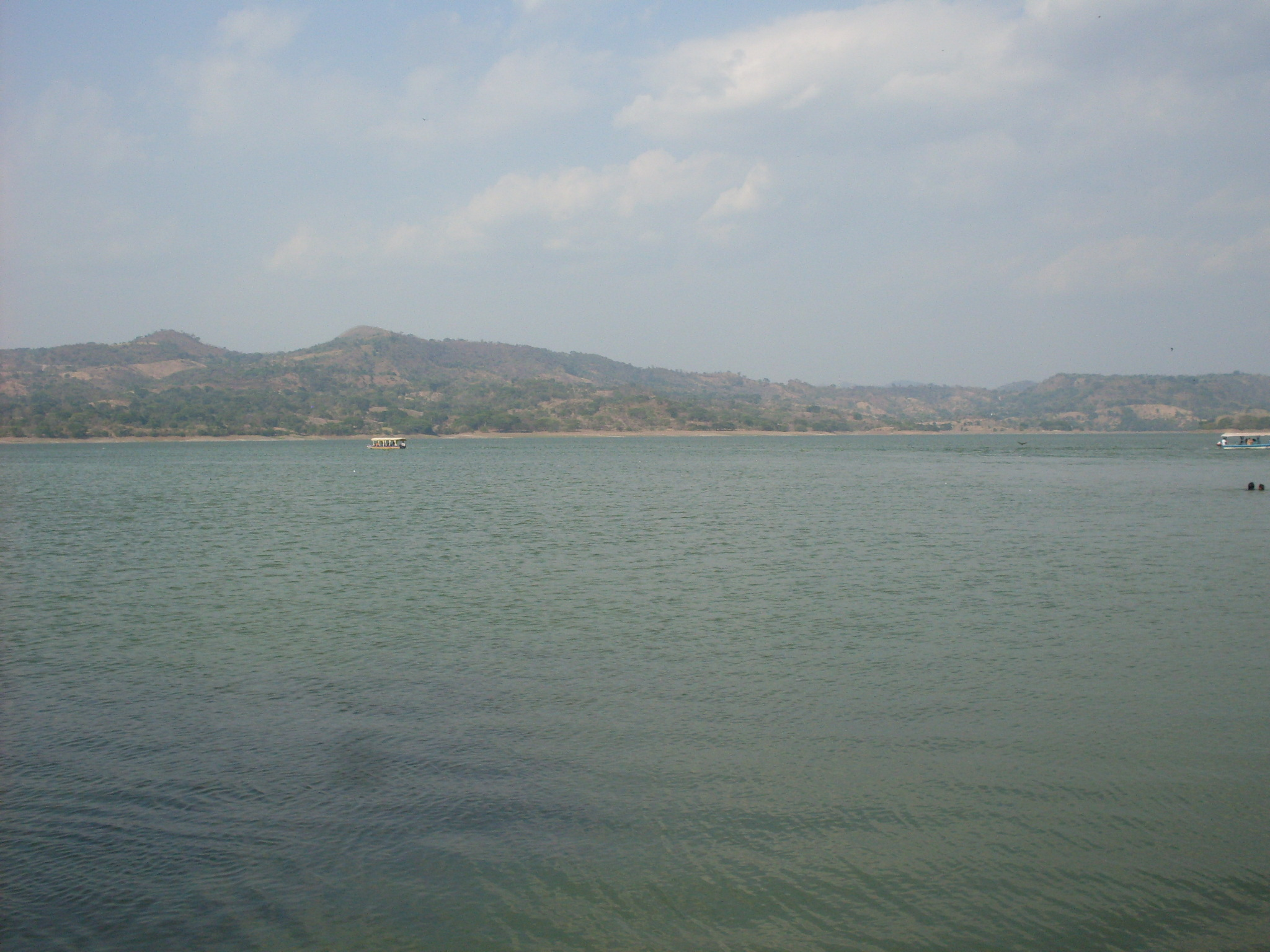
- View of the reservoir from Suchitoto

- Location within El Salvador
- Location: El Salvador, Central America
- Coordinates: 14°00′00″N 89°01′50″W
- Type: Artificial lake
- Etymology: Nahuatl for "Place of Flowers" (for Suchitlán)
- Primary inflows: Acelhuate River, Lempa River
- Primary outflows: Lempa River
- First flooded: 1976
- Max. length: 40 km (25 mi)
- Max. width: 10 km (6.2 mi)
- Surface area: 135 km^{2} (52 sq mi)
- Average depth: 30 m (98 ft)
- Max. depth: 56 m (184 ft)
- Water volume: 2,150 km^{3} (520 cu mi)
- Surface elevation: 230 m (750 ft)
- Settlements: Colima, Platanares, San Cristobal, San Francisco Lempa, San Juan, San Luis del Carmen

The Cerrón Grande Reservoir (Spanish: Embalse Cerrón Grande), also known locally as Lake Suchitlán (Spanish: Lago Suchitlán), is a reservoir in northern El Salvador and the largest body of fresh water in the country. The reservoir was filled between 1973 and 1976, subsequent to the construction of the Cerrón Grande Hydroelectric Dam. The Cerrón Grande Reservoir is among the most polluted bodies of fresh water in Central America.

== Name ==
The reservoir is called Cerrón Grande after the hydroelectric dam that formed it, which itself was named after the property it was built on. The reservoir is known locally as Lake Suchitlán (Lago Suchitlán). Suchitlán is a Nahuatl word meaning "Place of Flowers" and was coined by Salvadoran writer Alejandro Cotto.

== Geography ==
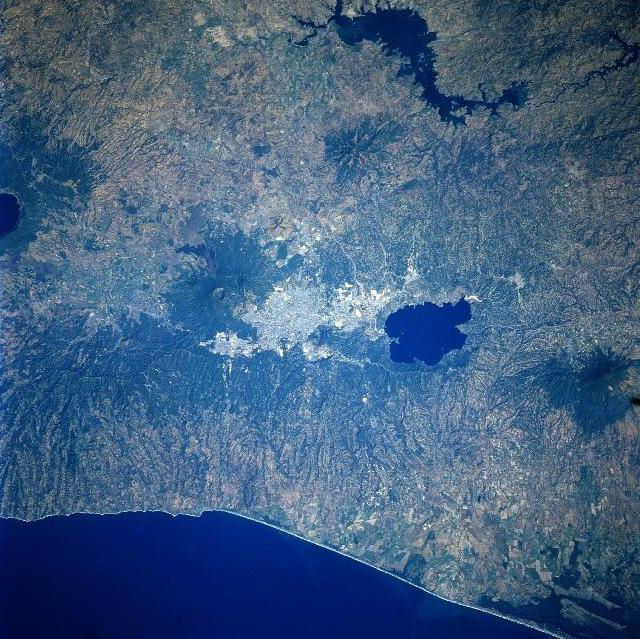
The Cerrón Grande Reservoir is the northernmost body of water in this image taken by NASA.

The Cerrón Grande Reservoir is located in northern El Salvador and surrounded by the departments of Cabañas, Chalatenango, Cuscatlán, and San Salvador. The reservoir's primary inflows are the Acelhuate River and the Lempa River. Its primary outflow is the Lempa River, which flows northwest to southeast.

The reservoir has a surface area of 135 square kilometres (52 sq mi), making it the largest body of water in the country. The average flow of the Lempa River from the reservoir is about 153 cubic metres (5,400 ft^{3}) per second.

== Ecology and tourism ==
The lake is populated by twelve of the country's fourteen native fish species as well as by many bird and plant species, making it a popular tourist destination. A 38,000 hectares (94,000 acres) site encompassing the lake and its surrounds has been designated an Important Bird Area (IBA) by BirdLife International because it supports significant populations of white-bellied chachalacas, lesser ground-cuckoos, Pacific screech-owls, orange-fronted parakeets, Nutting's flycatchers and white-throated magpie-jays.

In 2005, the reservoir was declared a part of the Cerrón Grande Wetland in an effort to preserve the wildlife that live in the reservoir. Common tourist activities on the reservoir include birdwatching, boat rides, and kayaking.

== History ==
In 1973, President Arturo Armando Molina began the construction of the Cerrón Grande Hydroelectric Dam, and it was fully flooded by December 1976. The dam has an output capacity of 135 megawatts.

The area that was flooded included several villages, fertile farmland, grazing land, and archeological sites of the Lenca people; around 12,000 people were displaced from this area, and another 9,000 were relocated in the three Core Relocation settlements. Part of the main road connecting Chalatenango to El Coyolito was flooded and had to be rebuilt, and direct access from Chalatenango to Suchitoto was severed.

== Contamination and pollution ==
According to the International Ecological Engineering Society (IEES), the reservoir is one of the most contaminated and polluted bodies of fresh water in Central America. An investigation by the Salvadoran Association of Human Aid Pro-Vida found high levels of contamination and pollution such as "[h]eavy metals, banned insecticides, cyanides, fecal bacteria, and toxic algae", which negatively affects the health of people and animals living near and around the reservoir. Large amounts of waste are dumped into the reservoir from San Salvador via the Acelhuate River (as much as 4,000,000 kilograms (8,800,000 lb) of feces monthly). Since its creation, the reservoir has transformed into hypertrophic lake, a lake with a high abundance of nutrients, which caused anoxia and reductions in water quality. Toxic substances such as cyanide and Dieldrin, an insecticide whose importation and distribution (but not usage) was banned by the Salvadoran government in 2000, have been found in abundance in the waters of the reservoir. The United States Army Corps of Engineers stated that sedimentation, which is caused by deforestation, in the reservoir is "dangerously high" and estimated to be around 7 million cubic meters (247 million cubic feet) per year.

== Gallery ==
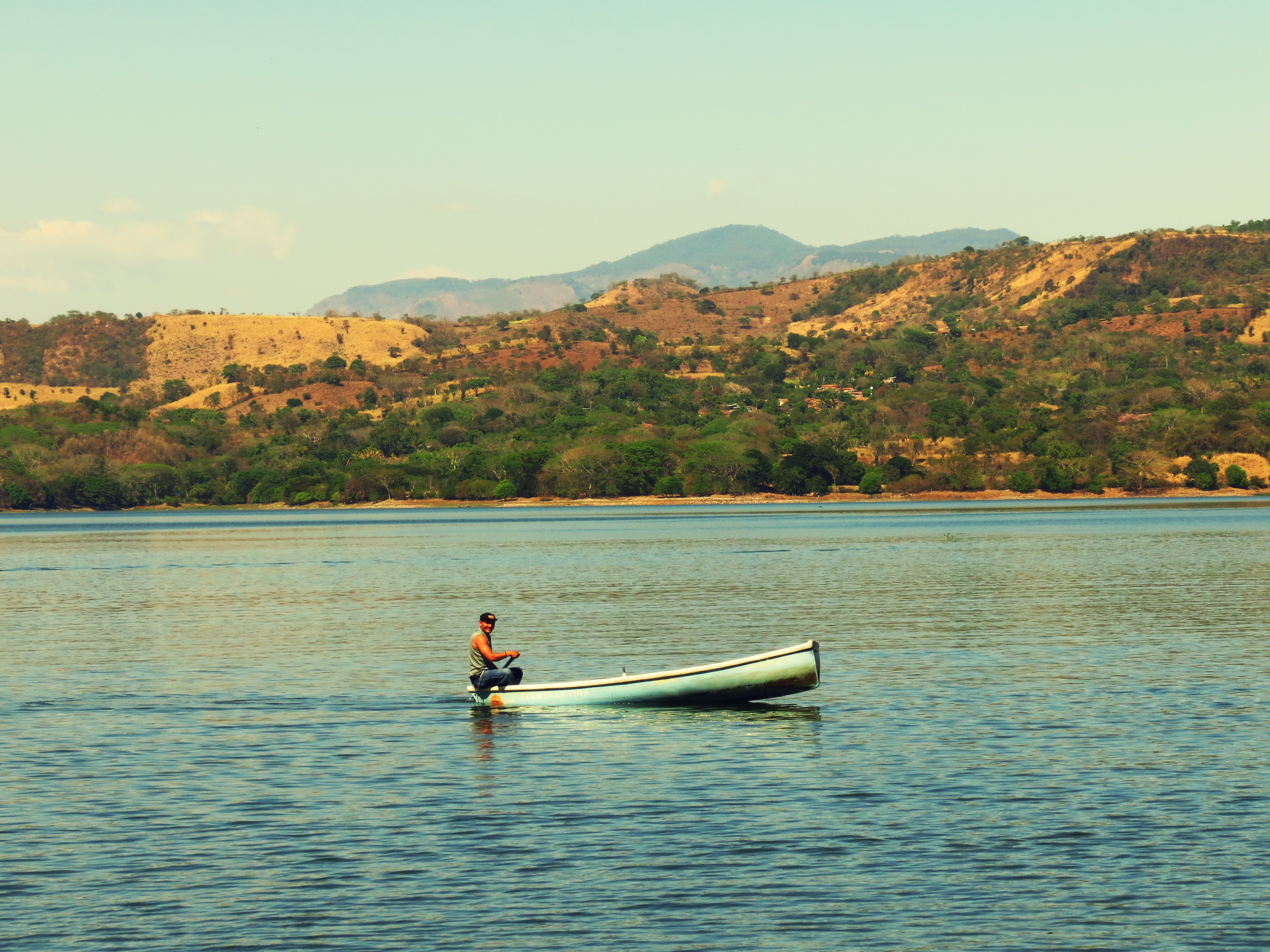
A boater on the reservoir.

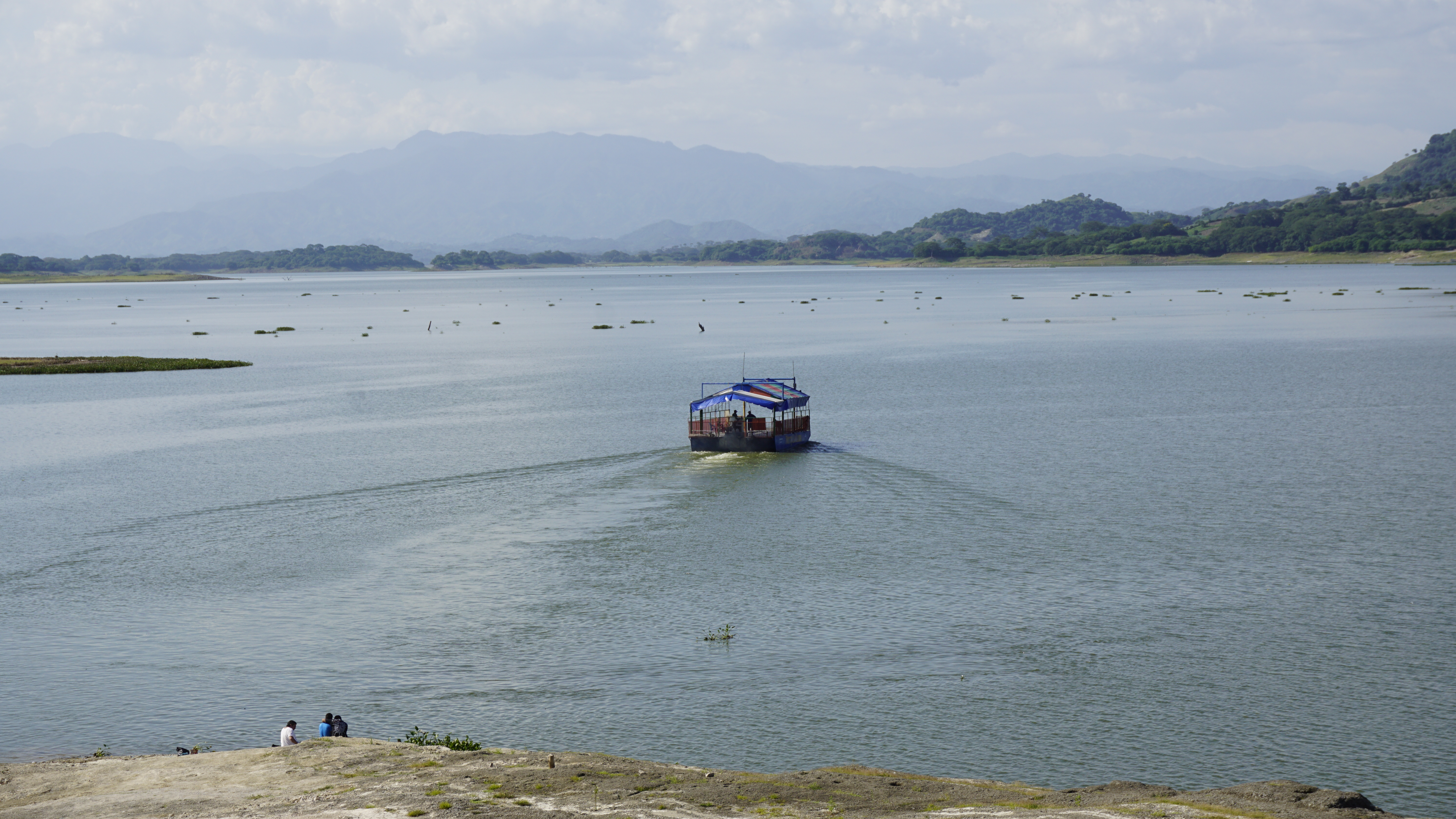
A boat leaving San Juan.

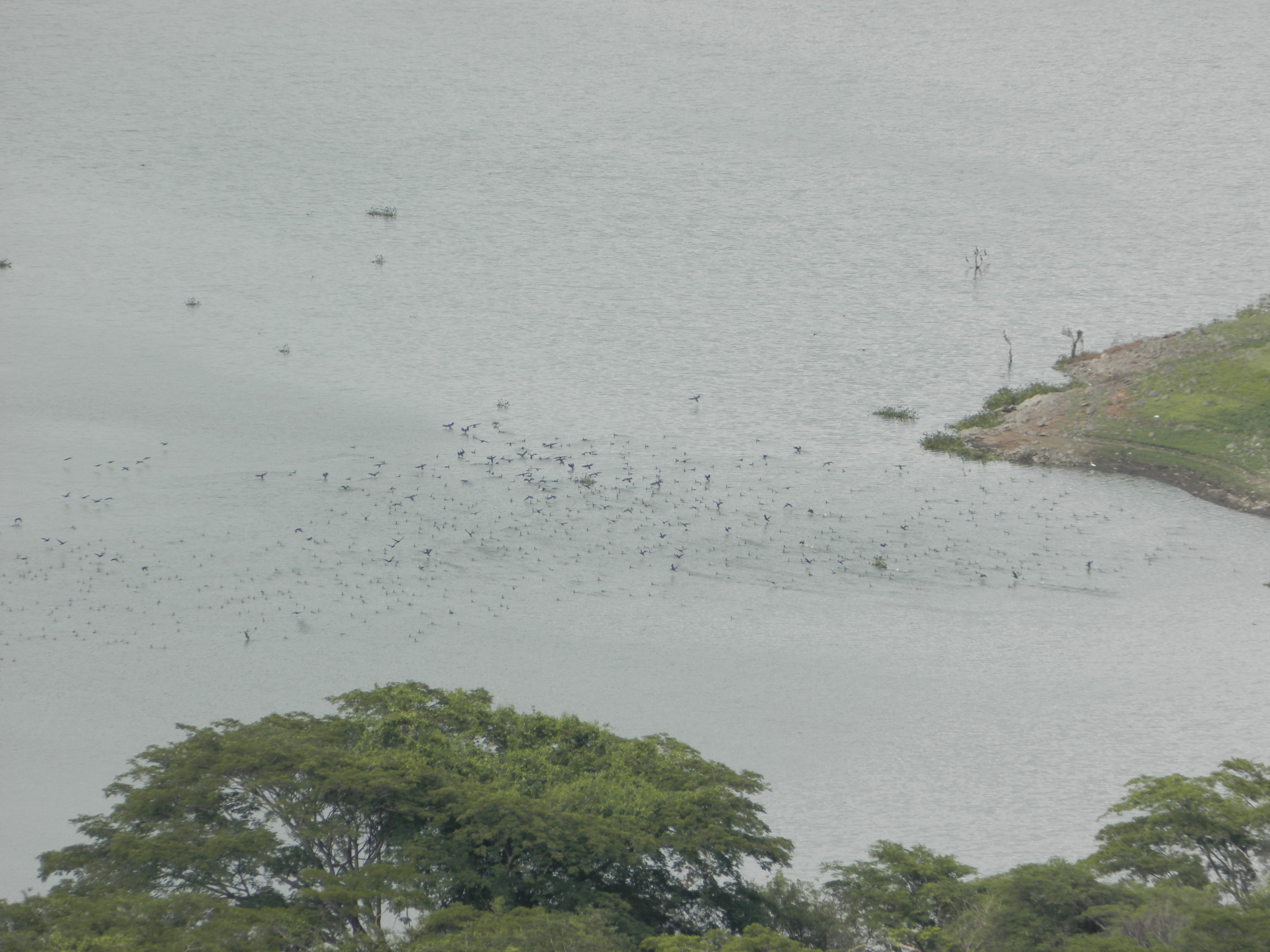
Birds on the reservoir.

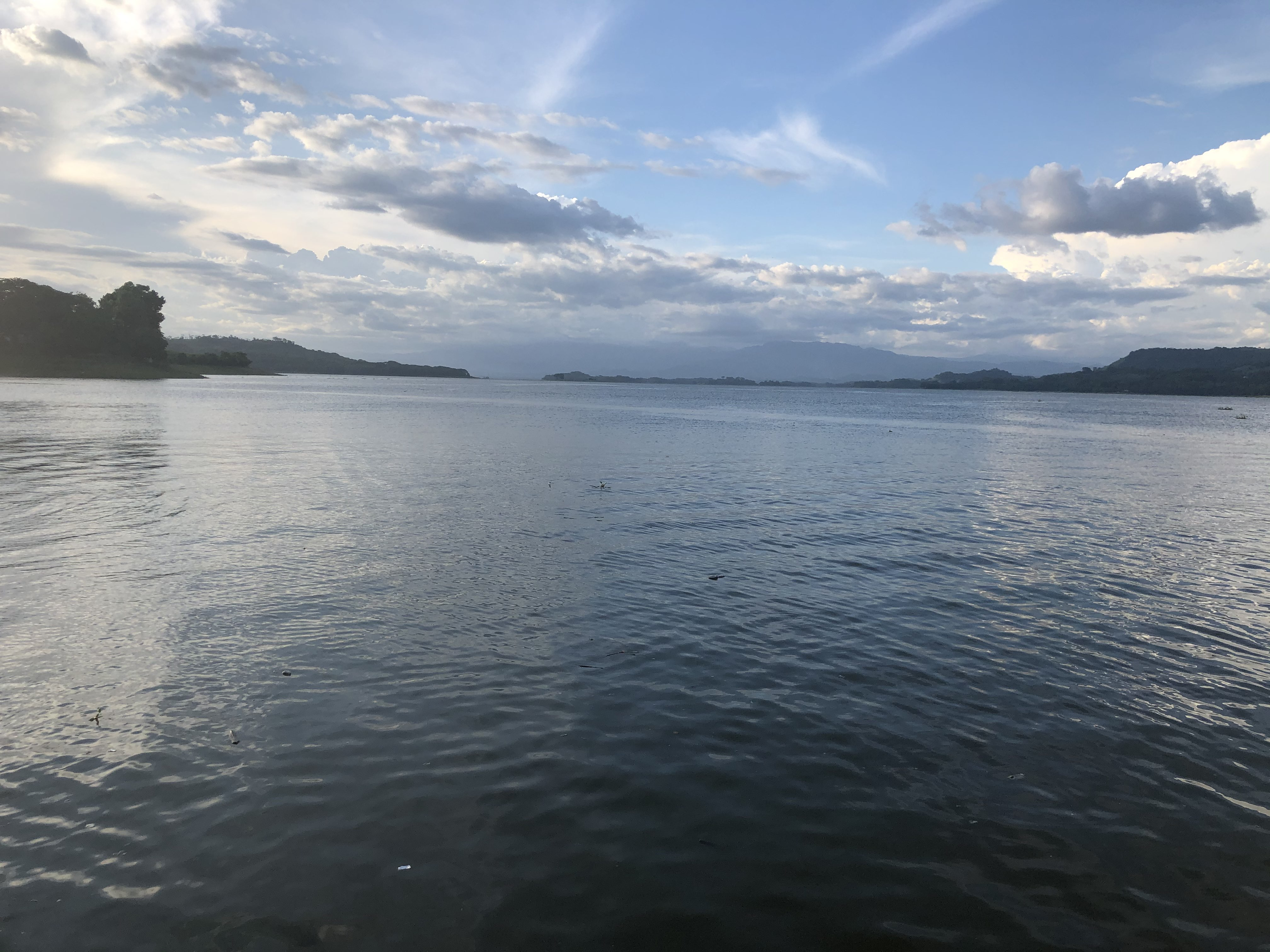
View of the reservoir from San Juan.

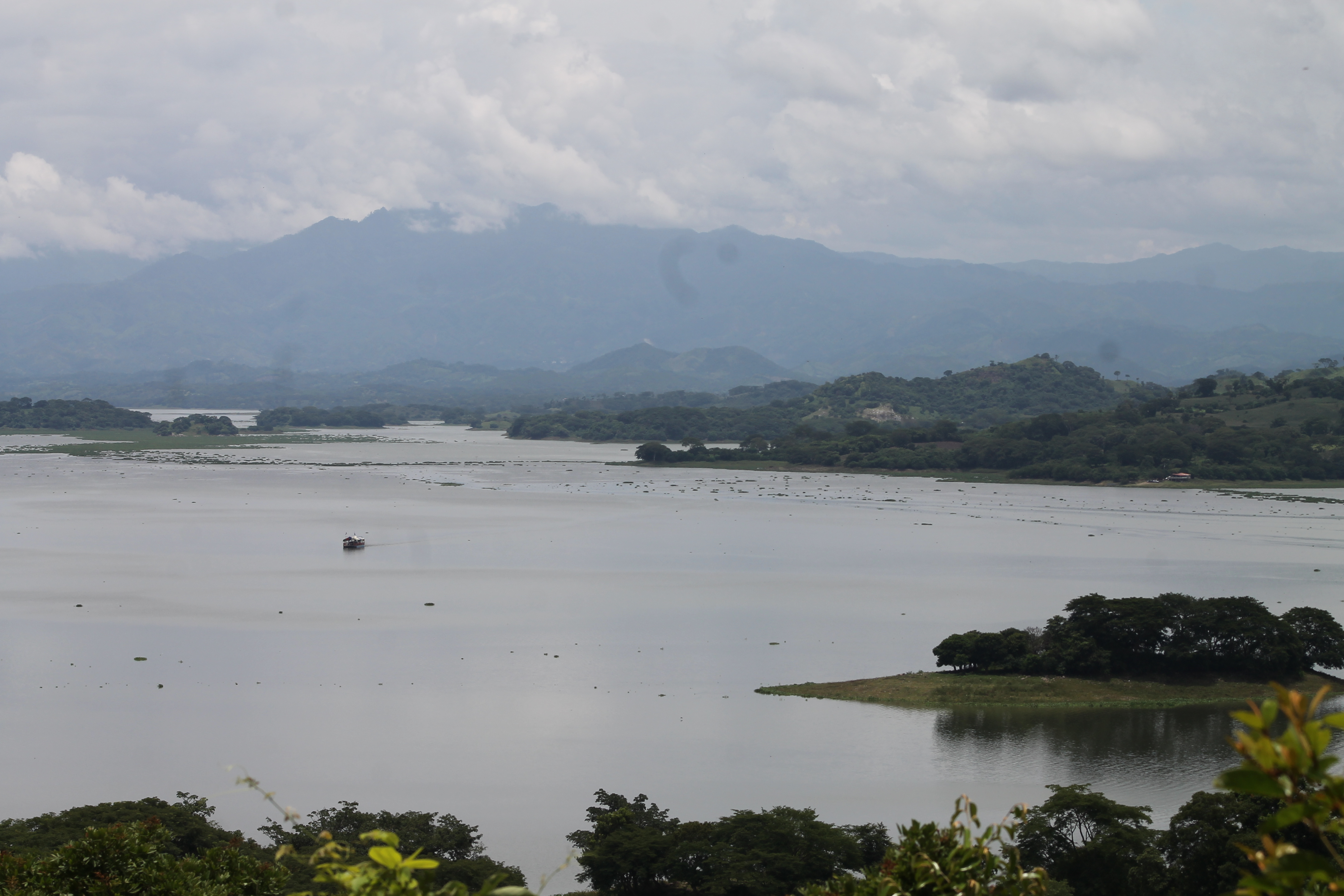
View of the reservoir from Los Tercios.

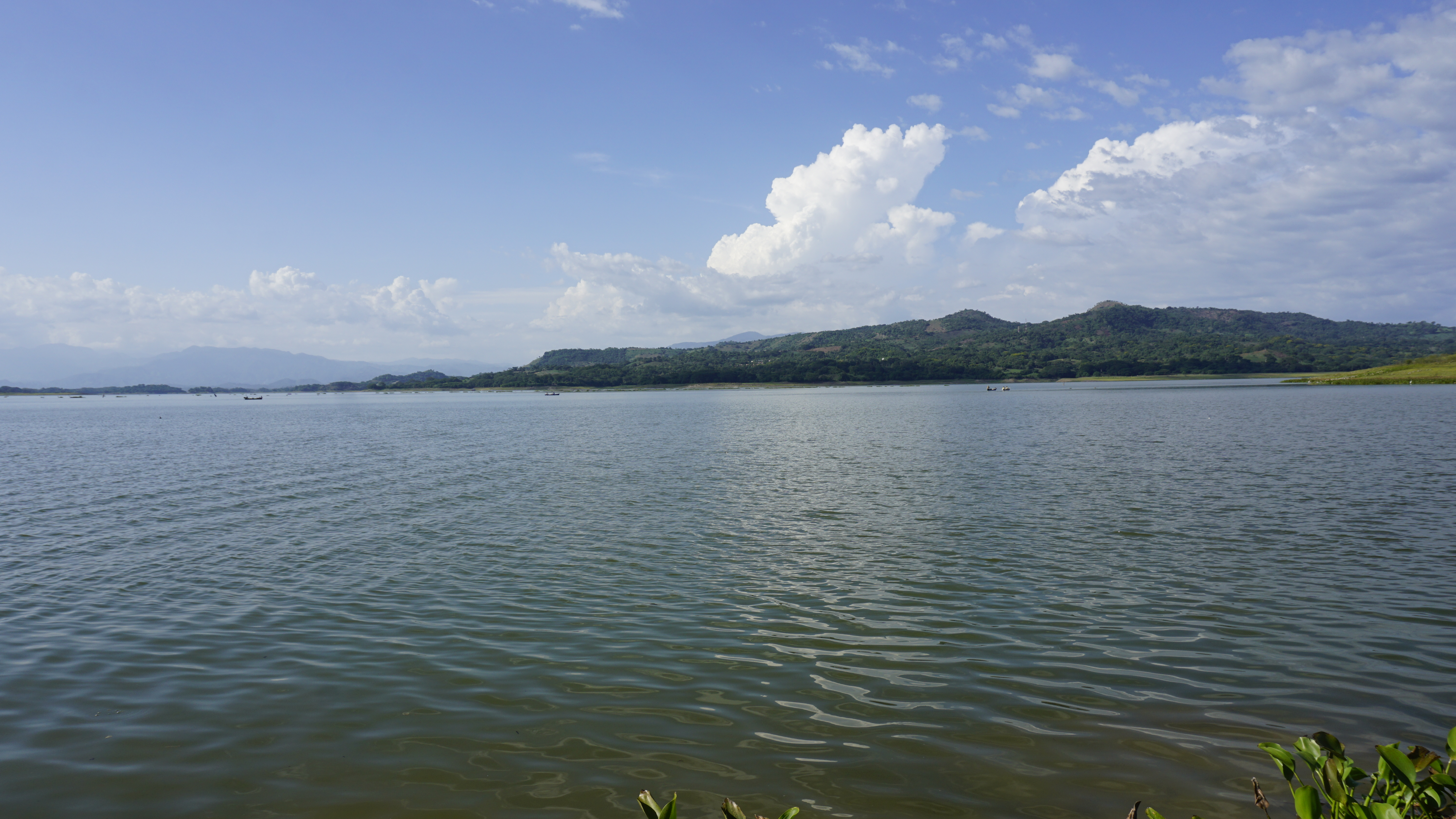
View of the reservoir from San Francisco Lempa.

== See also ==
- Cantón El Tablón – a canton of Suchitoto flooded by the reservoir
- Lake Ilopango – El Salvador's largest natural lake
