= Jutiapa (disambiguation) =

Jutiapa is a municipality in Jutiapa Department, Guatemala.

Jutiapa may also refer to:

- Jutiapa Department, a department in Guatemala
- Jutiapa, Cabañas, a municipality in Cabañas Department, El Salvador
- Jutiapa, Atlántida, a municipality in Atlántida Department, Honduras
