= Suchitoto =

- District
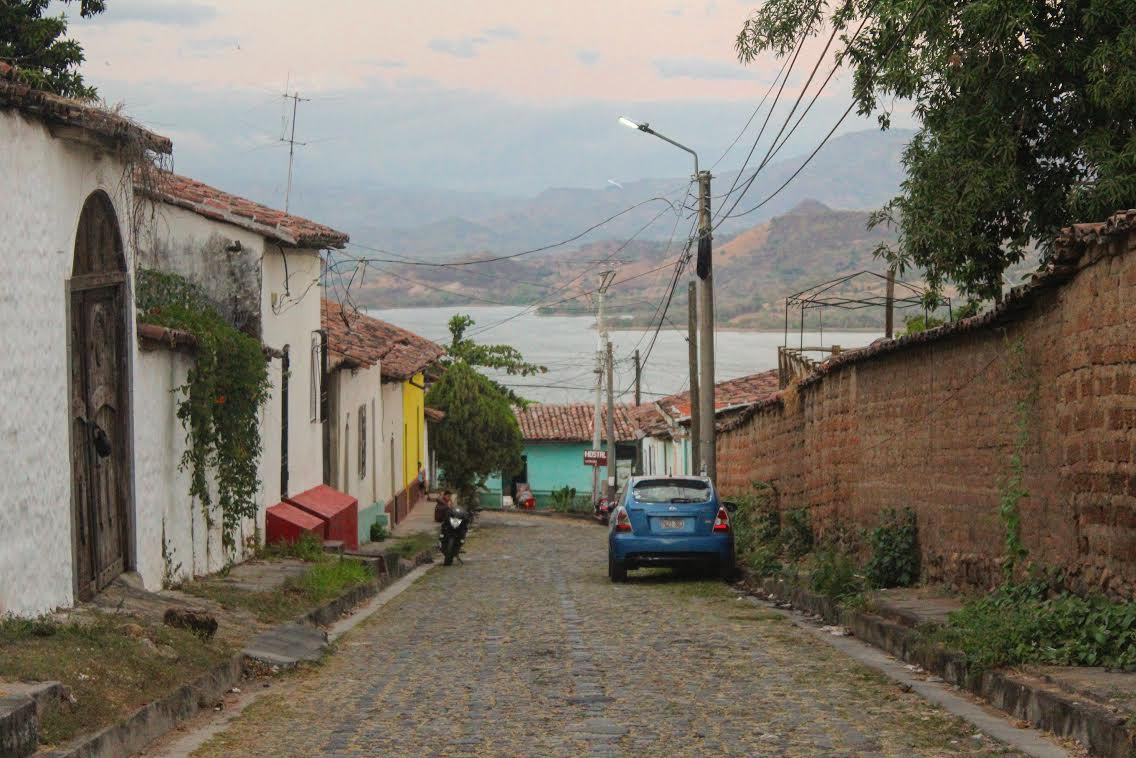
- Suchitoto, El Salvador

- Suchitoto, Cuscatlan, El Salvador
- Coordinates: 13°56′N 89°2′W
- Country: El Salvador
- Department: Cuscatlán
- Municipality: Cuscatlán Norte
- Villa: March 22, 1836
- City: July 15, 1858
- Elevation: 1,086 ft (331 m)

Population (2024)
  - District: 22,716
  - Rank: 66th in El Salvador
  - Urban: 6,908
  - Rural: 15,808

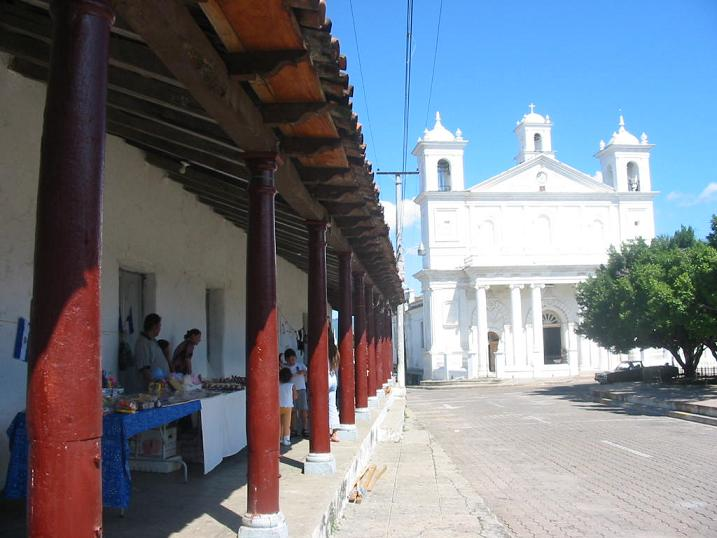
Area around the main square of the colonial town of Suchitoto, with its church built by the Spaniards in the 18th century

Suchitoto is a district in the Cuscatlán Department, El Salvador that has seen continuous human habitation long before Spanish colonization. Within its municipal territory, Suchitoto holds the site of the original founding of the Villa of San Salvador in 1528 that existed for a short time before the site was abandoned. In more recent times, the municipality has prospered even after the severe effects of civil war in El Salvador that lasted between 1980–1992 and saw the population of Suchitoto decrease from 34,101 people in 1971 to 13,850 by 1992. It has become an important tourist destination partly due to its well conserved colonial architecture and cobblestone roads that provide a sense of Spanish colonial living. This rise in tourism has attracted service sector businesses to open up in the small city including hostels, restaurants, and picturesque cafes. As a result of tourism, many arts and cultural spaces have opened up in Suchitoto that are also providing positive alternative opportunities for youth in the community. According to the 2007 Official Census, the small city has a population of 24,786 people with 7,654 people living in the urban area and 17,132 people living in the rural communities.

== History ==
=== Pre-Columbian era and Spanish colonization ===
The population of the area surrounding Suchitoto is of pre-Columbian origin, and its inhabitants belonged to the Nahua ethnic group. A major site of ritual human sacrifice, it was already a densely populated site upon the arrival of the Spanish conquerors, who reestablished the town of San Salvador about 12 km from the area by Diego de Alvarado. in the Bermuda Valley in April 1528, by order of the lieutenant governor and captain general Don Jorge de Alvarado. The original settlement had taken place in 1525 in an undetermined location.

The town, dedicated to the Holy Trinity, had a difficult existence. Apart from the siege by the natives, the villagers faced the threat of Martín de Estete, an envoy of Pedrarias Dávila who wanted to be recognized as their lieutenant governor and captain general. Around 1539, the settlers began to move to the Hamacas Valley, the current site of the city of San Salvador, so the town of Bermuda was abandoned. The official authorization of the transfer was made by resolution of the Royal Court of the Confines in 1545. By the year 1550 Suchitoto had about 600 inhabitants.

Due to its privileged position, the town was the parish seat of an extensive territory of the Guatemalan bishopric. By 1770, according to Pedro Cortés y Larraz, there were about 43 "tributary Indians,” so their population was estimated at 215 people. Furthermore, as head of the parish, the parish seat exercised jurisdiction in the towns of Jutiapa and Tenancingo. It was notable enough that the Central American hero Vicente Aguilar y Bustamante was one of its parish priests. The town's prominence further grew with the rise of indigo manufacturing beginning in the region in the 17th century due to its role as one of the sector's most important production centers. In 1786, Suchitoto joined the San Salvador Party of the San Salvador Municipality. According to Mayor Antonio Gutiérrez y Ulloa, 911 people lived in the place in 1807.

=== Republican era ===
By the Republican era, Suchitoto had become part of the department of San Salvador following the department's establishment on June 12, 1824. In 1835, by decree of the Supreme Chief Nicolás Espinoza, the town was established as the head of the department of Cuscatlán and was also part of the Suchitoto district. Suchitoto acquired the title of town on March 22, 1836. On the other hand, in the midst of the conflicts that devastated the Federal Republic of Central America, General Francisco Morazán was in Suchitoto in 1839, who tried to prevent an advance by Francisco Ferrera.

Throughout the remainder of the 19th century, the town maintained its economic importance through indigo trade and early coffee cultivation, which fueled a period of architectural expansion characterized by neoclassical and traditional adobe constructions arranged around central courtyards.

=== The lost cantons of Suchitoto and the Cerrón Grande Hydroelectric Dam ===
What is known today as Lake Suchitlán, a man-made lake, was formed in the mid-1970s as a result of the construction of the Cerrón Grande Hydroelectric Dam. It was a project initiated by the central federal government of El Salvador to produce hydro electricity for the country. As a result of the flooding associated with the project, 13,339 people were internally displaced from their family homes and lands, with around 9,000 people relocating to other communities and the rest receiving a small lump sum of money for their properties. The project affected four Departments: Chalatenango, Cuscatlán, San Salvador, and Cabañas. The Department of Chalatenango seeing the most municipalities affected including Tejutla, El Paraiso, San Rafael, Santa Rita, Chalatenango, Azacualpa, San Francisco Lempa, San Luis del Carmen, and Potonico; San Salvador seeing the municipality of El Paisnal affected, and Cuscatlán seeing the municipality of Suchitoto affected.

The project was initiated on August 4, 1972, by the newly elected government of former President Arturo Armando Molina who had discussed the project as part of his government's platform. The project was to create a dam on the Lempa River where two Francis turbines, with a capacity to produce 67.5 MW each, would be constructed as additions to the two turbine system already built on the Guajoyo River and Lempa River. The project was advertised as the best resource for the country's energy problem, and was to be built 22 kilometres upstream from the Central dam on the Lempa River, between the municipality of Potonico, Chalatenango and Jutiapa, Cabañas. As a result of this construction, 2,180 million cubic metres of water flooded an area of around 13,500 hectares of land and formed the 135 kilometres squared artificial lake called Lago Suchitlan. As a result of the lake, 24 archaeological sites were flooded and multiple cantons and caserios or hamlets disappeared, including Canton El Tablon and Canton San Juan in Suchitoto.

Suchitoto is a Sister City of Prescott, Arizona.
