= San Antonio, El Salvador =

San Antonio
- Municipality
- Location in El Salvador
- Coordinates: 13°50′N 88°16′W
- Country: El Salvador
- Department: San Miguel Department
- Elevation: 2,024 ft (617 m)

Population (2024 census)
  - Total: 5,941

San Antonio is a municipality in the San Miguel department of El Salvador.

== See also ==
- San Antonio del Mosco Bridge
