= San Antonio del Mosco Bridge =

Bridge near San Antonio, El Salvador

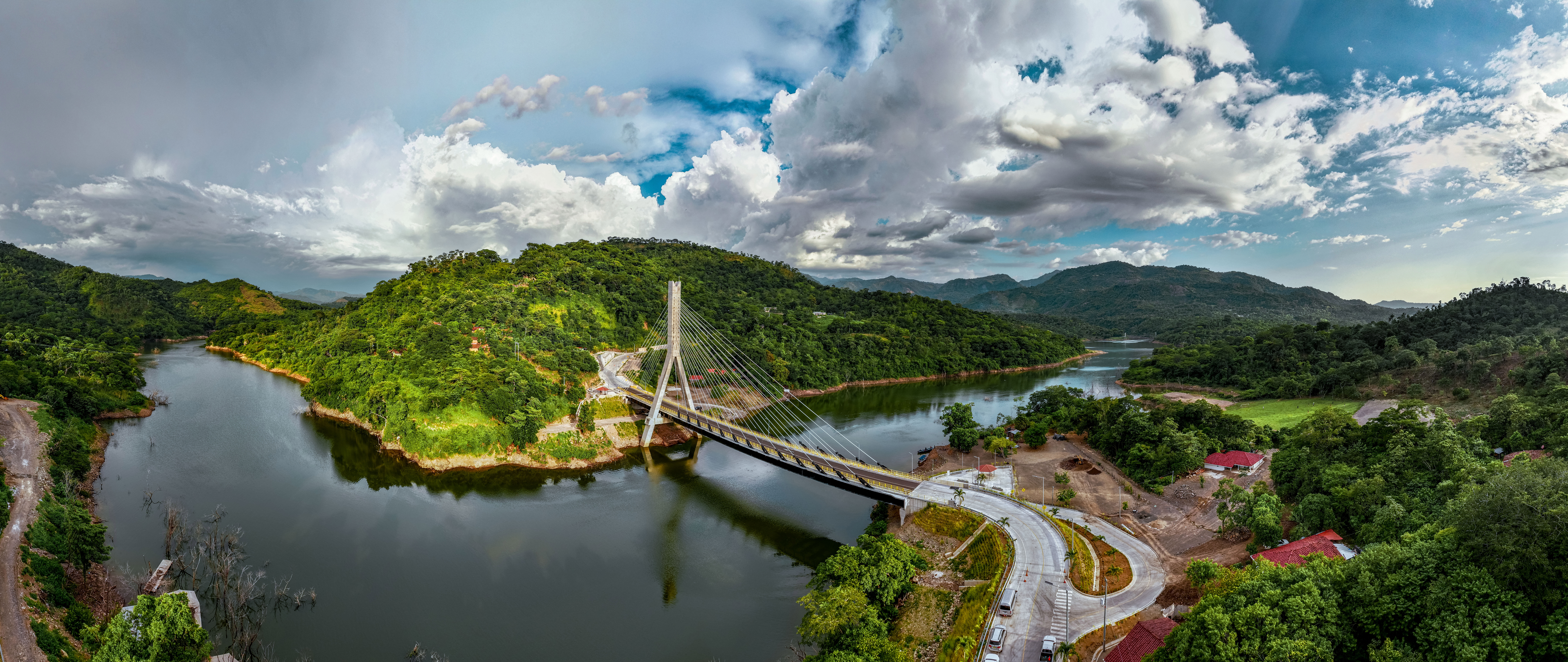
- The bridge in August 2025
- Coordinates: 13°52′21.5832″N 88°16′25.806″W

Characteristics
- Total length: 157.6 metres (517 ft)
- Width: 13 metres (43 ft)
- Height: 87.1 metres (286 ft)

The San Antonio del Mosco Bridge, or simply San Antonio Bridge, is a cable-stayed road infrastructure located over the Torola River in El Salvador. It is notable for being the first bridge of its kind in the country and for its modern architectural design, conceived to facilitate both vehicular and pedestrian traffic, as well as to promote tourism activities in the area. The project had a total investment of 11.8 million U.S. dollars.

== Technical features ==
The bridge has a total length of 157.6 meters and a width of 13 meters, distributed into an 8-meter-wide two-lane roadway and two lateral pedestrian sidewalks, each 92 centimeters wide. The structure features pylons 87.1 meters high and a total of 20 segments. The cable system, with a cumulative length of 47.81 kilometers, allows for a load capacity of up to 40 tons.

The design load complies with the international HL93 standard used for high-capacity bridges. Its construction required 4,371.6 cubic meters of concrete and 608.9 tons of steel. The height above the Torola River bed is 24.0 meters from the reservoir’s minimum level and 8.0 meters from its maximum level.
