= San Jorge, El Salvador =

San Jorge
- Municipality
- Location in El Salvador
- Coordinates: 13°25′N 88°21′W
- Country: El Salvador
- Department: San Miguel Department

Government
- Elevation: 1,473 ft (449 m)

Population (2024)
  - Total: 9,414

San Jorge is a municipality in the San Miguel department of El Salvador.
