= Nueva Guadalupe =

- District
- Location in El Salvador
- Coordinates: 13°32′N 88°21′W
- Country: El Salvador
- Department: San Miguel Department
- Elevation: 1,644 ft (501 m)

Population
  - Total: 8,996 (2,018)

Nueva Guadalupe is a district in the San Miguel department of El Salvador, with nearly 9000 inhabitants in 2018.
