= Sesori =

- Municipality
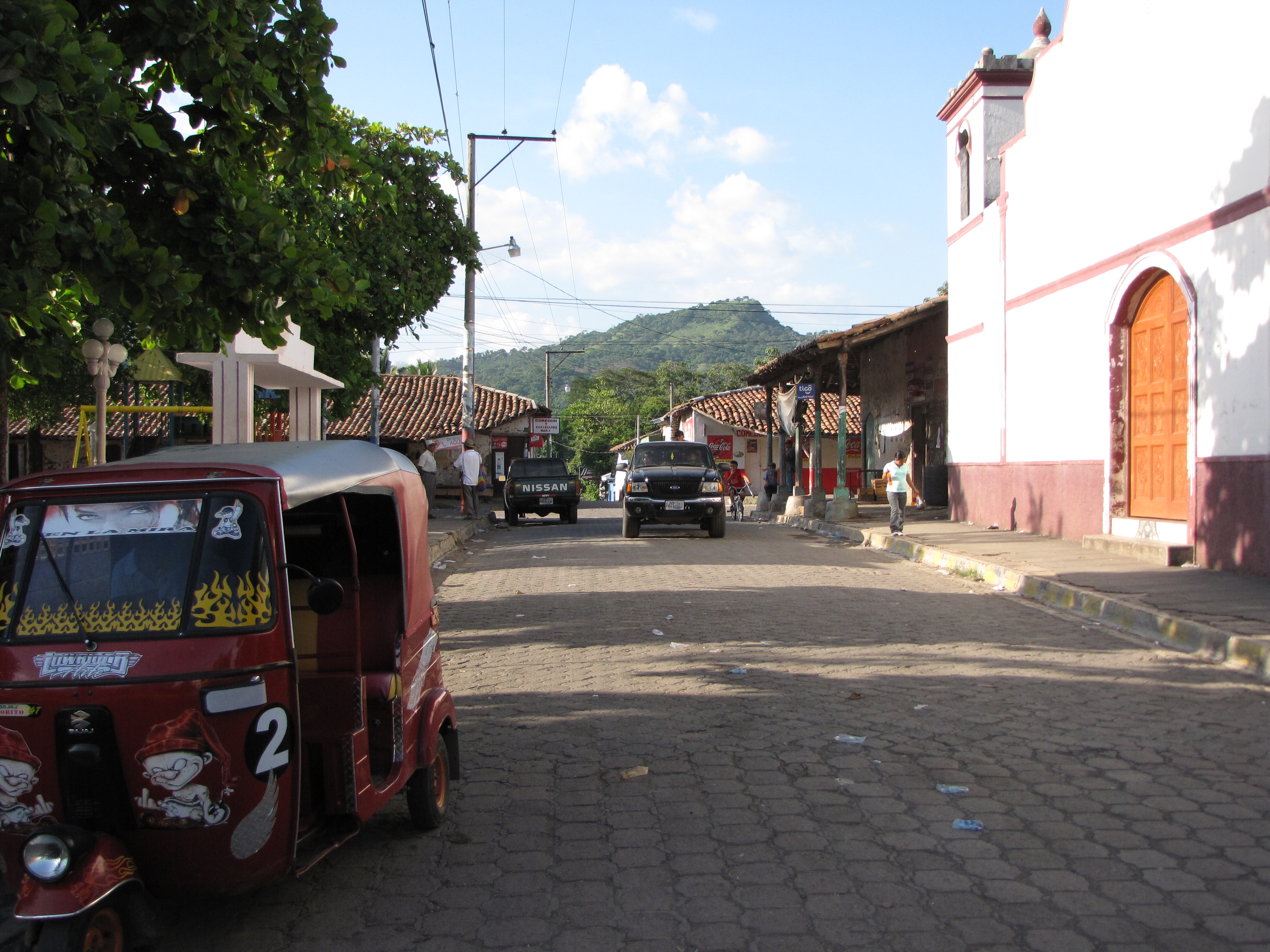
- Ciudad de Sesori downtown

- Location in El Salvador
- Coordinates: 13°43′N 88°22′W
- Country: El Salvador
- Department: San Miguel Department
- Elevation: 660 ft (200 m)

Population (2024)
  - Total: 10,128
- Website: facebook.com/sesorences

Sesori is a municipality in the Department of San Miguel, El Salvador. This is where many of the local people come and get food, supplies, education and it is also here where they get transportation to larger cities. Its location was used by other surrounding villages as people came here to make use of telephone services provided by ANTEL (Administracion Nacional de Telecomunicaciones).
