= Cerrón Grande Dam =

Cerrón Grande Hydroelectric Dam
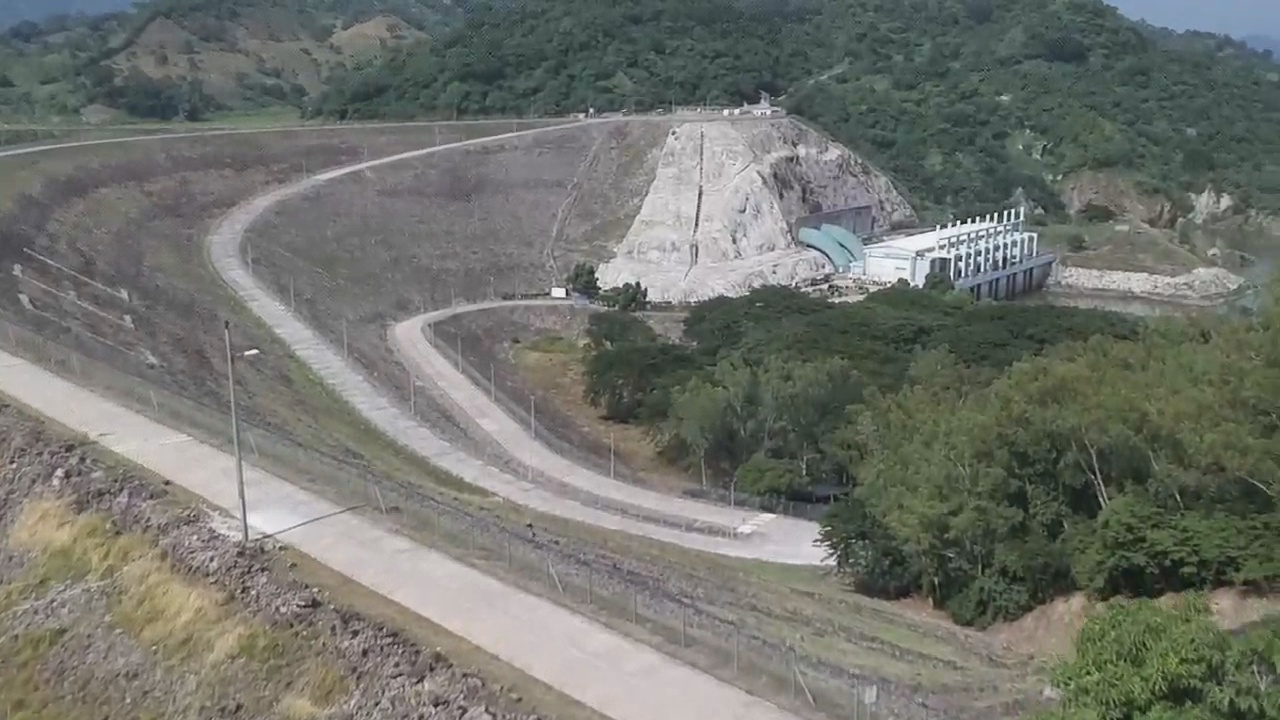
- Interactive map of Cerrón Grande Hydroelectric Dam
- Official name: Central Hidroeléctrica Cerrón Grande
- Location: Chalatenango (El Salvador)
- Coordinates: 13°56′24.3″N 88°54′01.3″W
- Opening date: 1976
- Operator: CEL

Dam and spillways
- Impounds: Lempa River
- Height: 90 m
- Length: 800 m

Reservoir
- Creates: Embalse Cerrón Grande
- Total capacity: 2,180 million m³
- Surface area: 135 km²

Ramsar Wetland
- Official name: Embalse Cerrón Grande
- Designated: 22 November 2005
- Reference no.: 1592

The Cerrón Grande Hydroelectric Dam (Spanish: Central Hidroeléctrica Cerrón Grande) spans the Lempa River 78 km (48 mi) north of San Salvador in the municipalities of Potonico, (Chalatenango) and Jutiapa (Cabañas) in El Salvador.

The concrete gravity dam has a height of 90 m (300 ft) and a length of 800 m (2,600 ft). The dam's reservoir has a surface area of 135 km^{2} (52 sq mi) and a capacity of 2,180,000 cubic metres (77,000,000 cu ft).

The hydroelectric power plant was fitted with 2 x 67.5 MWe Francis turbines with a total capacity of 135 Mwe. Major maintenance work carried out between 2003 and 2007 included replacing the turbines with 2 x 85 MWe units with a total capacity of 170 MWe, which generate 488 GWh per year.

== Cerrón Grande Reservoir ==
The Cerrón Grande Reservoir (Spanish: Embalse Cerrón Grande), locally known as Lake Suchitlán, is the largest body of fresh water in El Salvador. In 2005, the reservoir and approximately 470 km^{2} (180 mi^{2}) of adjacent area was listed as a "Wetland of International Importance" under the Ramsar Convention. The area provides a habitat for large numbers of waterbird, duck and fish species.

== History ==
Because of the construction of the Cerrón Grande Hydroelectric Dam, over 13,000 people were displaced with many cantons or townships, caserios or hamlets, churches, cemeteries, and over 20 significant archaeological sites being lost in the process including Canton El Tablón and Canton San Juan in Suchitoto, Cuscatlán.

== See also ==
- Electricity sector in El Salvador
- 3 February Hydroelectric Dam
