= San Gerardo =

- District
- Gerardo Barrios
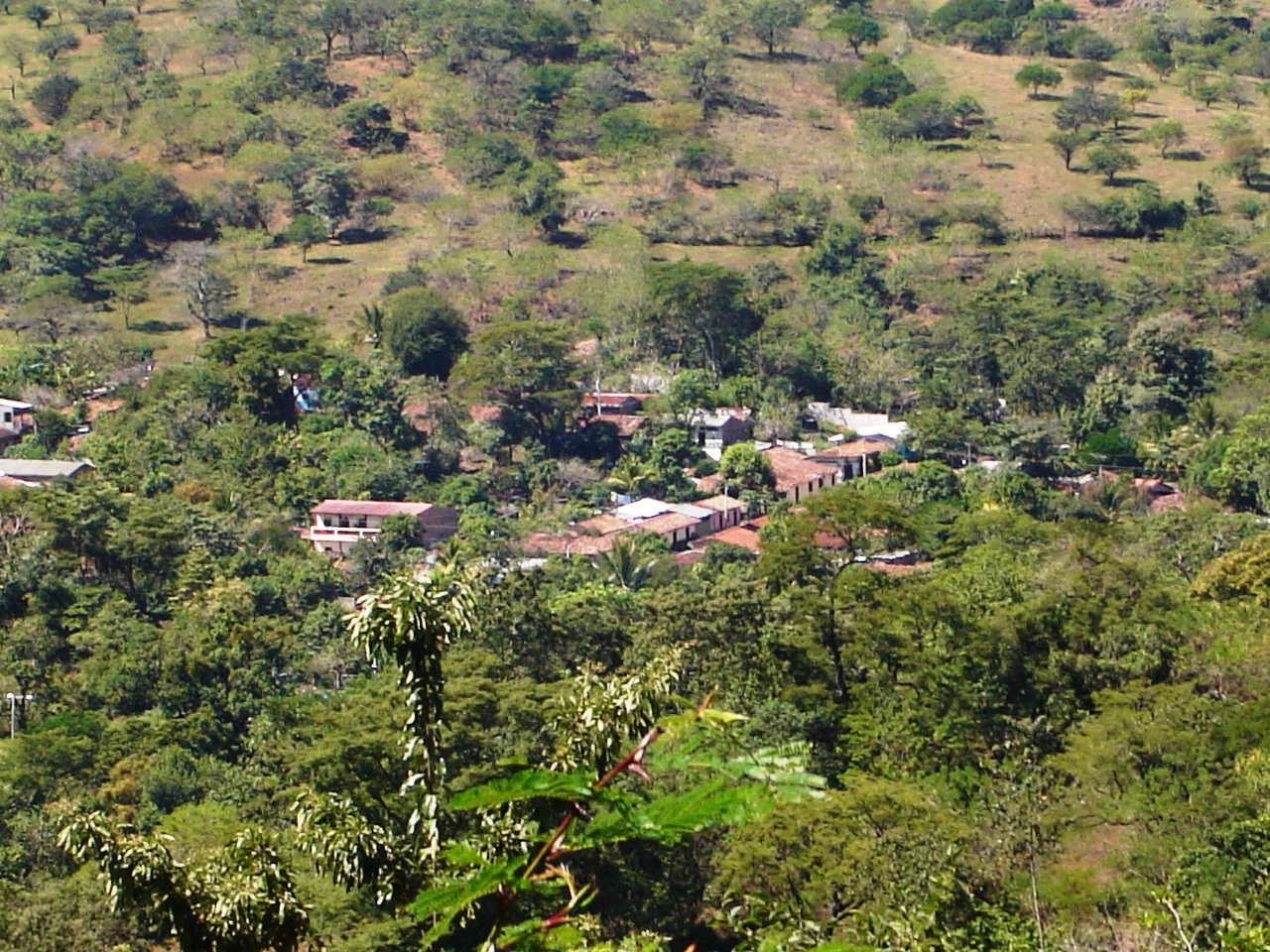

- Location in El Salvador
- Coordinates: 13°48′N 88°24′W
- Country: El Salvador
- Department: San Miguel Department

Government
  - Governor: Es el de distrito
- Elevation: 1,010 ft (308 m)

San Gerardo is a district in the department of San Miguel, El Salvador.
