= San Miguel Department (El Salvador) =

Department of El Salvador

San Miguel
- Department
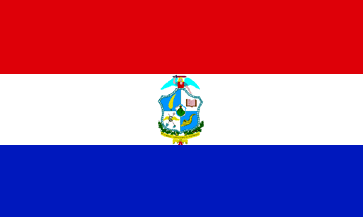
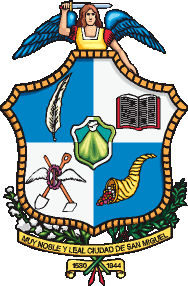
- Flag Coat of arms

- Location within El Salvador
- Coordinates: 13°31′19″N 88°14′02″W
- Country: El Salvador
- Created (given current status): 1824
- Capital: San Miguel

Area
  - Total: 2,077.1 km^{2} (802.0 sq mi)
  - Rank: Ranked 2nd

Population (2024 census)
  - Total: 447,625
  - Rank: Ranked 3rd
  - Density: 215.50/km^{2} (558.15/sq mi)
- Time zone: UTC−6 (CST)
- ISO 3166 code: SV-SM

San Miguel (Spanish pronunciation: [ˈsam miˈɣel]) is a department in the eastern part of El Salvador. The capital is San Miguel. The department is 2,077 km^{2} in area and has a population of 447,625.

Before the Spanish conquest of El Salvador, the territory that now consists of the departments of San Miguel, La Unión and Morazán was the Lenca kingdom of Chaparrastique (Place of Beautiful Orchids).

San Miguel was first known as San Miguel de la Frontera. The city was founded by Luis de Moscoso on May 8, 1530, where it is now Santa Elena. On July 11, 1812, the city was given the title of "Noble y Leal Ciudad" (noble and loyal city). It was made a department on June 12, 1824.

It is the location of Ciudad Barrios, the birthplace of Archbishop Óscar Romero.

== Municipalities ==
1. San Miguel Centro
2. San Miguel Norte
3. San Miguel Sur

== Districts ==
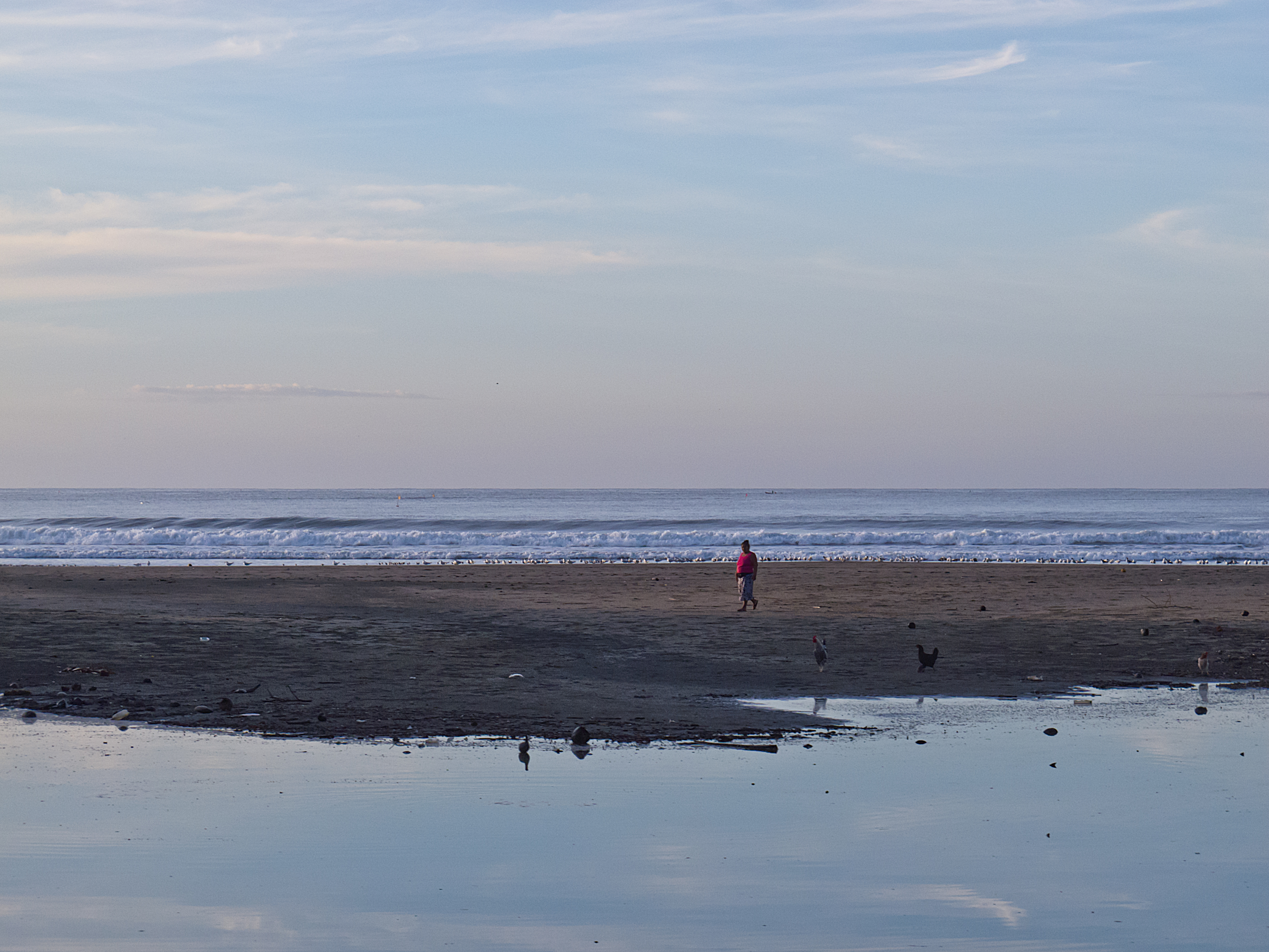
A beach in El Cuco, San Miguel

1. Carolina
2. Chapeltique
3. Chinameca
4. Chirilagua
5. Ciudad Barrios
6. Comacarán
7. El Tránsito
8. Lolotique
9. Moncagua
10. Nueva Guadalupe
11. Nuevo Edén de San Juan
12. Quelepa
13. San Antonio
14. San Gerardo
15. San Jorge
16. San Luis de la Reina
17. San Miguel
18. San Rafael Oriente
19. Sesori
20. Uluazapa

== Agriculture ==
The products that are more cultivated are the basic grains, henequen and sugar cane, fruits, oleaginous seeds, mangrove, and grass. The upbringing of bovine, swinish, goat, and mule livestock exists and the upbringing of corral birds and of bees. Among the most important manufacturing, there is the elaboration of nutritious products, threads, yarns, drinks, cotton fabrics, clothes, leather articles, detergents, soaps, milk, and construction material.

== Tourism ==
There are a few beaches in the San Miguel department, such as El Cuco.
