= Torola River =

River in El Salvador and Honduras

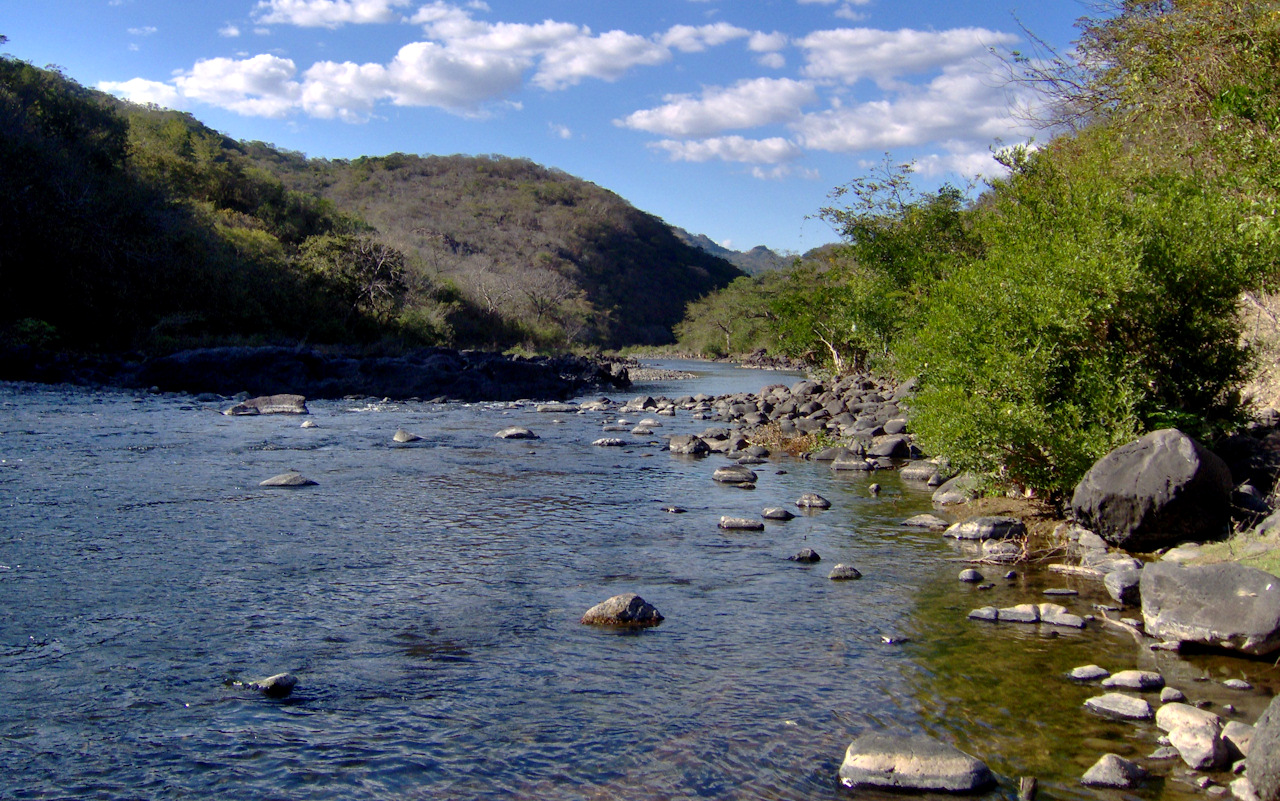

- Location of mouth

Location
- Country: Honduras, El Salvador

Physical characteristics
- Mouth: Lempa River
  - coordinates: 13°51′37″N 88°29′29″W

The Torola River is a river in El Salvador and Honduras.

The river is 227 meters (745 feet) above sea level. Its length is 100.3 kilometers (62 miles).
