= Jutiapa, El Salvador =

Jutiapa (Tepehahua)
- District
- Distrito de Jutiapa
- Location of Jutiapa in the Department of Cabañas

- Location in El Salvador
- Coordinates: 13°53′N 88°54′W
- Country: El Salvador
- Department: Cabañas
- Municipality: Cabañas Oeste

Government
  - Type: Mayoralty
  - Mayor: Lorenzo Rivas

Area
  - District: 25.92 sq mi (67.12 km^{2})
- Elevation: 2,064 ft (629 m)

Population (2024)
  - District: 7,129
  - Rank: 166th in El Salvador
  - Rural: 7,129
- Time zone: UTC-6
- Postal code: 1206

Jutiapa is a district in the Cabañas Department of El Salvador. Its population was over 7000 inhabitants for the year 2015.

== History ==
Jutiapa is a pre-Columbian settlement whose original name was Tepeahua. In 1740 there were about 25 inhabitants, and in 1770, as part of the parish of Suchitoto according to Pedro Cortés y Larraz, there were 189.

Between 1824 and 1835, it was part of the department of San Salvador, and in the last year it became part of Cuscatlan. In 1859, Jutiapa had 1,772 inhabitants, and neighbouring with several farms indigo. Due to the decree on February 10, 1873, it became part to Cabañas. It received the title of town on January 25, 1879.

== General information ==
The district covers an area of 67.12 km² and has an altitude of 380 m. The festivities are celebrated in the month of November in honor to San Cristobal. The name Tepeahua means "Hill of Oaks" or "Place of oaks"; and Jutiapa, "River of the Jutes". Over the years, the town has been known as Tepeagua (1548), San Cristóbal Jutiapa (1740), and Jutiapa (1770–1807).
