= San Luis de la Reina =

City in San Miguel Department, El Salvador

- Municipality
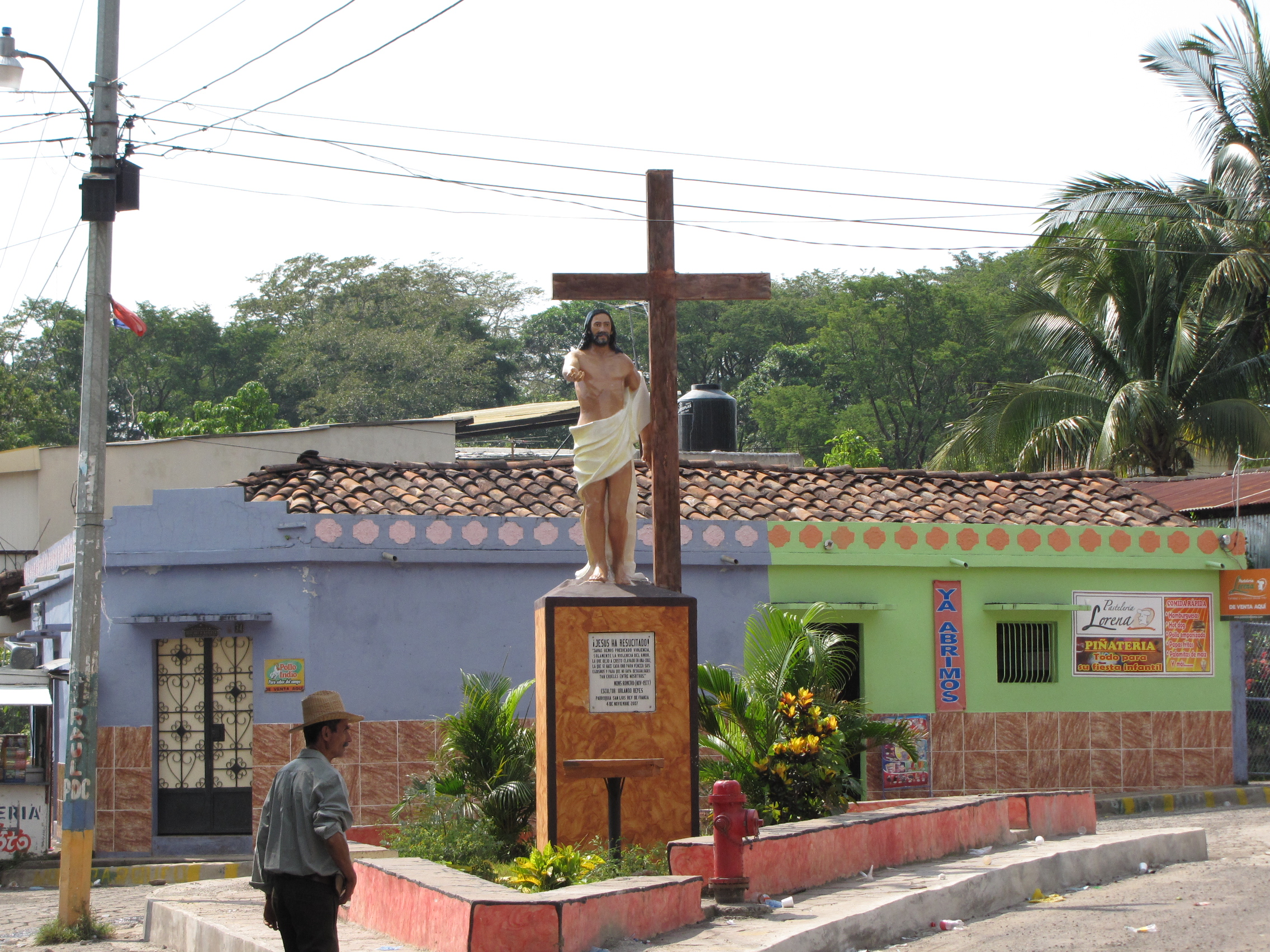

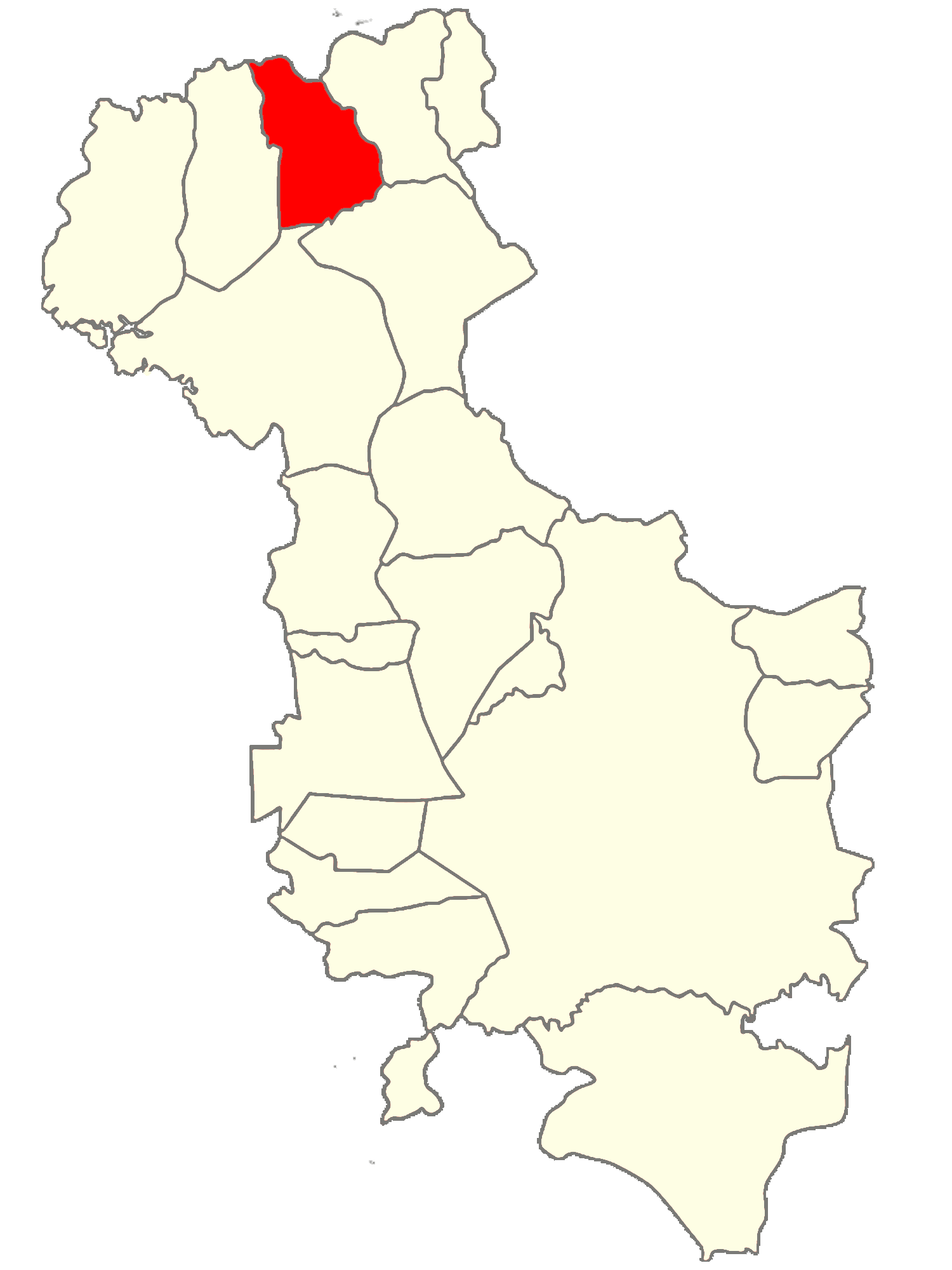

- Location in El Salvador
- Coordinates: 13°49′N 88°21′W
- Country: El Salvador
- Department: San Miguel Department
- Established: 1811

Area
  - Total: 64.9 sq mi (168.2 km^{2})
- Elevation: 1,729 ft (527 m)

Population (2024)
  - Total: 5,561

San Luis de la Reina (Saint Louis of the Queen) is a municipality in the San Miguel department of El Salvador. San Luis is an ecotourist destination.

In the late 18th century, the Ostucal Hacienda (Ostucal is Nawat for "houses in the ravine") was owned by the parish of Osicala. It produced indigo, cereals, and raised cattle. In 1811, it was constructed into and raised to a city; patronal festivals are held on 24 and 25 August.
