= Lempa River =

River that flows through Guatemala, El Salvador and Honduras

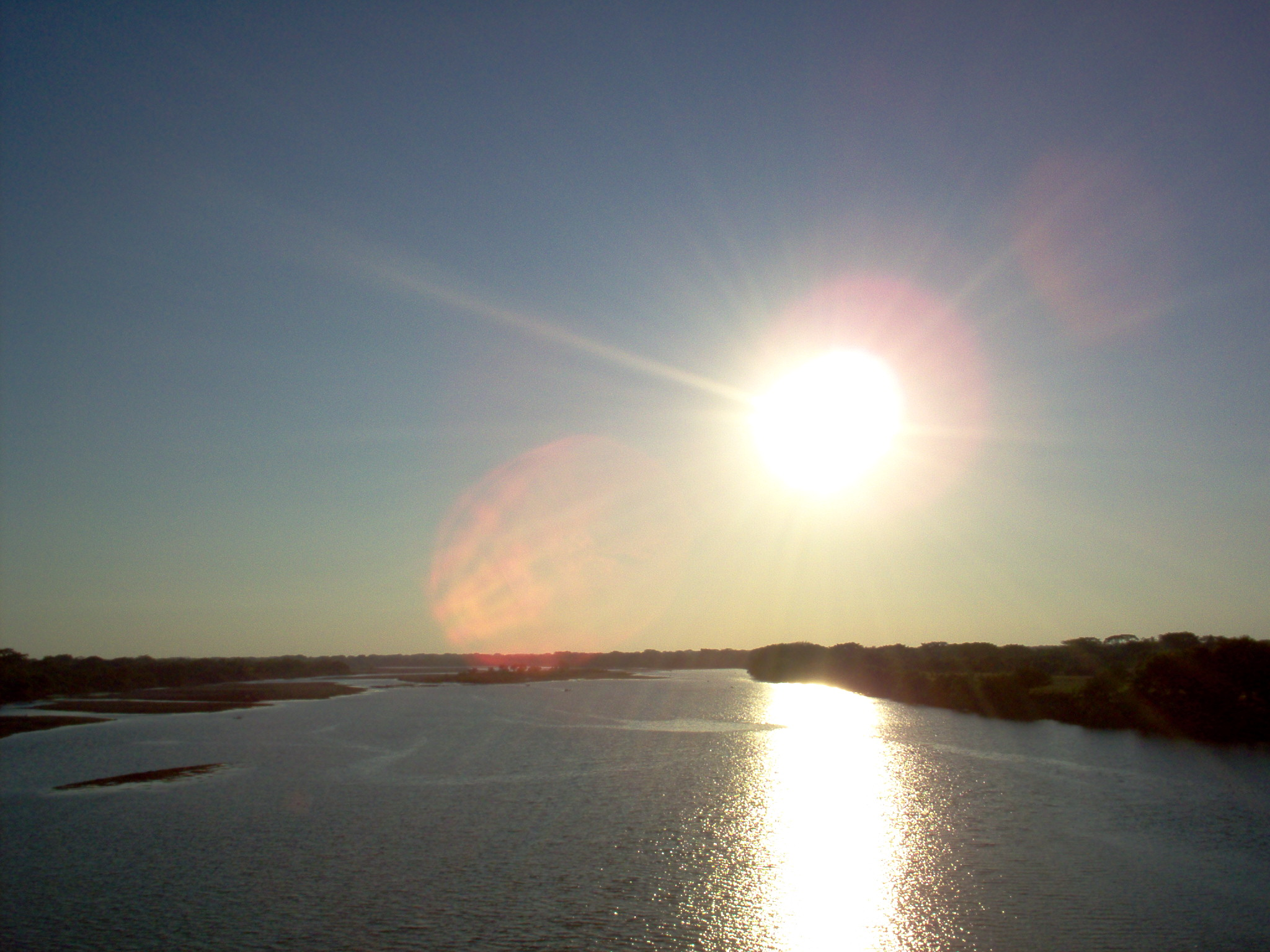
- Sunset over the Lempa river

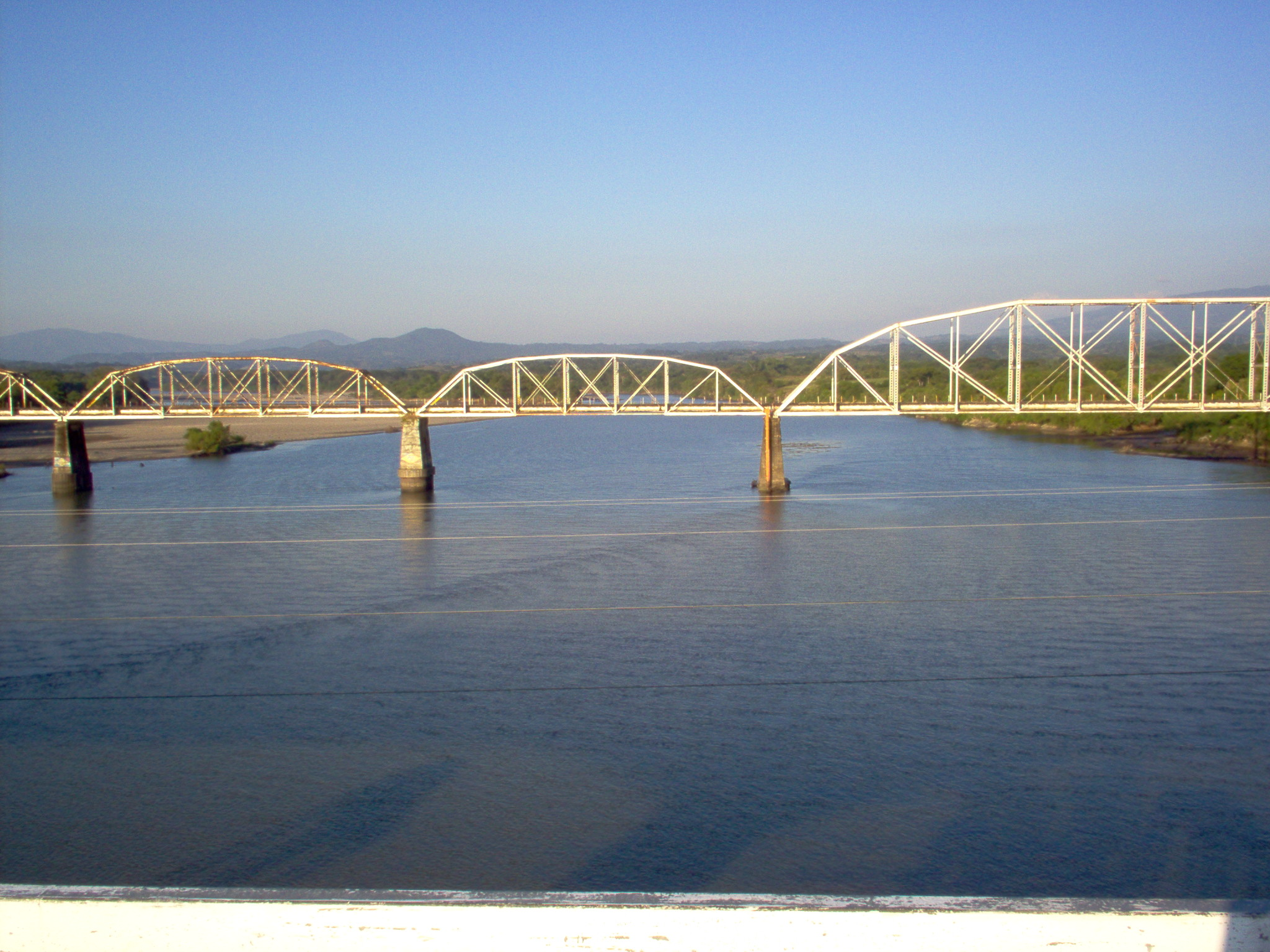
- Railroad Bridge (FENADESAL) over the Lempa river, as seen from the Carretera del Litoral highway bridge (El Salvador)

- Location within El Salvador

Location
- Countries: El Salvador; Honduras; Guatemala

Physical characteristics
- Source: Sierra Madre
  - location: Olopa, Chiquimula, Guatemala
  - coordinates: 14°41′33″N 89°18′18″W
  - elevation: 1,200 m (3,900 ft)
- Mouth: Pacific Ocean
  - location: El Playón, Tecoluca, San Vicente, El Salvador
  - coordinates: 13°15′17″N 88°49′38″W
  - elevation: 0 m (0 ft)
- Length: 422 km (262 mi)
- Basin size: 18,246 km^{2} (7,045 sq mi)
- Discharge
  - location: Cuscatlan bridge
  - average: 362 m^{3}/s (12,800 cu ft/s)

The Lempa River (Spanish: Río Lempa) is a 422-kilometre-long (262 mi) river in Central America. It is a transboundary river shared by El Salvador, Guatemala and Honduras.

== Geography ==
Its sources are located in between the Sierra Madre and the Sierra del Merendón mountain ranges in southern Guatemala, near the town of Olopa. In Guatemala, the river is called Olopa River and flows southwards for 30.4 kilometres (18.9 mi) before entering Honduras and changing its name to Lempa River at 14.547700°N 89.264002°W. In Honduras, it flows through the Ocotepeque Department for 31.4 kilometres (19.5 mi), and crosses the border with El Salvador at the town of Citalá (14.371857°N 89.212439°W) in the Chalatenango Department. The river continues its course for another 360 kilometres (220 mi) in El Salvador, flowing in a generally southwards direction until it reaches the Pacific Ocean in the San Vicente Department. The river forms a small part of the international boundary between El Salvador and Honduras.

The river's watershed covers 18,246 km^{2} (7,045 sq mi) of which 10,255 km^{2} (3,959 sq mi), that is, 56.56% of the watershed territory, lie in El Salvador; 5,696 km^{2} (2,199 sq mi) in Honduras; and 2,295 km^{2} (886 sq mi) in Guatemala. 49% of El Salvador's territory is covered by the Lempa River basin, and 77.5% of the Salvadoran population lives in cities, towns, and villages located within the basin territory, including the capital city of San Salvador.

== Hydroelectricity ==
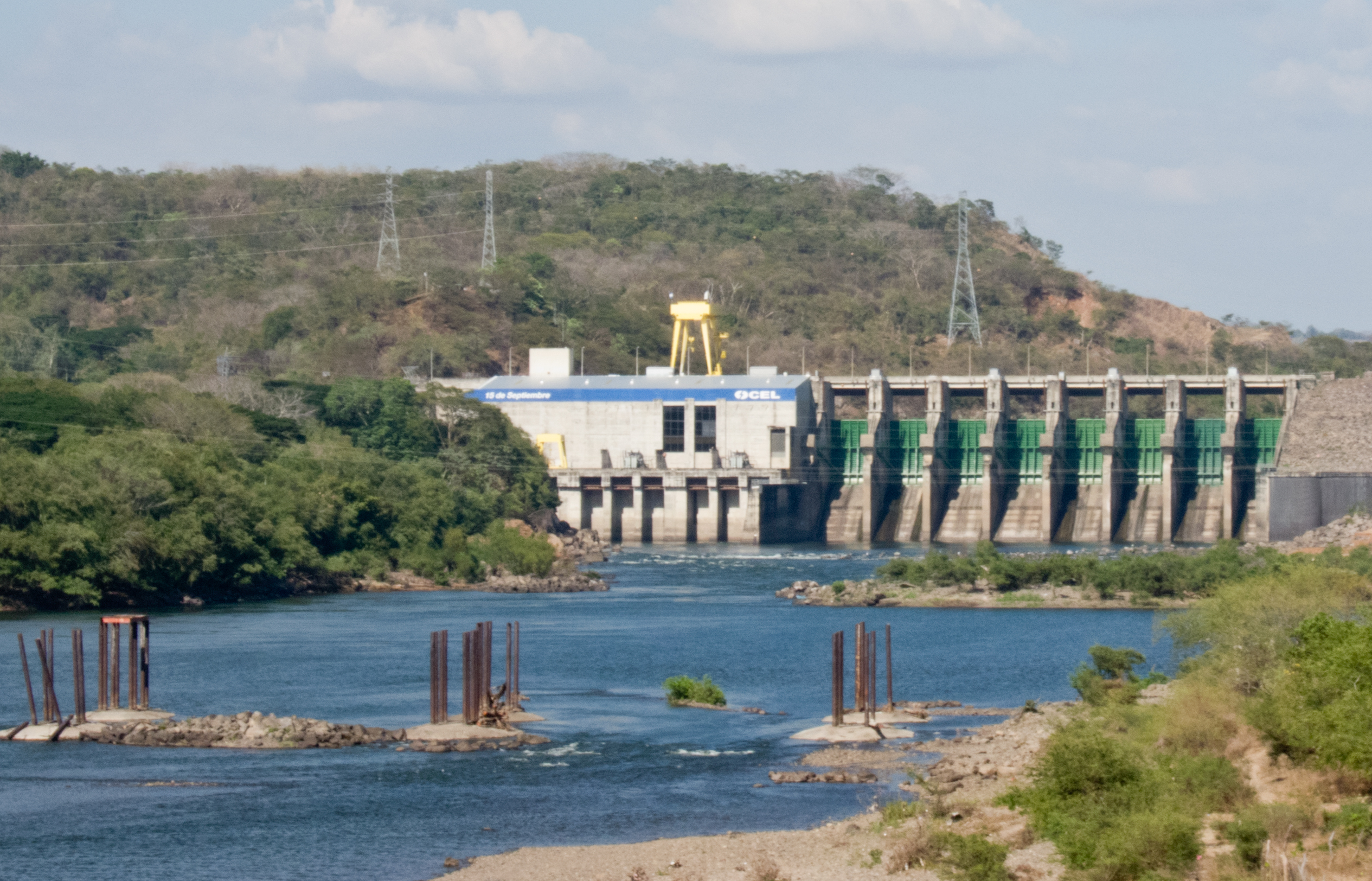
15 de Septiembre Hydroelectric dam over the Rio Lempa, El Salvador

There are several hydroelectric dams along the river. In El Salvador, there is the Guayojo Dam, the Cerrón Grande Hydroelectric Dam, the 5 de Noviembre Dam, and the 15 de Septiembre Dam. The latter can be easily seen from the Pan-American highway.

== See also ==
- List of rivers of Guatemala
- List of rivers of Honduras
- List of rivers of El Salvador
- List of rivers of the Americas by coastline
