= Salvadorans =

People of El Salvador

Salvadorans Salvadoreños
- Flag of El Salvador

Total population
- 8,066,060; El Salvador 6,486,000

Regions with significant populations
- United States: 1,410,659 – 2,619,946 (2023 ACS)
- Canada: 51,776
- Guatemala: 20,683
- Mexico: 16,807
- Costa Rica: 16,682
- Italy: 16,672
- Spain: 12,408
- Australia: 12,310
- Belize: 10,016
- Honduras: 9,071
- Panama: 4,147
- Sweden: 3,421
- Nicaragua: 2,557
- Germany: 1,475
- United Kingdom: 1,284
- France: 1,271
- Belgium: 1,081
- Switzerland: 970
- Venezuela: 956
- Colombia: 782
- Libya: 754
- Ecuador: 544
- Netherlands: 498
- Brazil: 289
- Dominican Republic: 278
- Norway: 225
- Egypt: 212
- Peru: 203
- Bolivia: 140
- Jamaica: 133

Languages
- Salvadoran Spanish; Indigenous languages

Religion
- Predominantly Christian: Roman Catholicism, Protestantism

Related ethnic groups
- Salvadoran American; Mestizo; Spaniards; Native Americans; Afro-Salvadoran; Guatemalans; Mexicans; Hondurans

Salvadorans (Spanish: Salvadoreños), also known as Salvadorians or Salvadoreans, are citizens of El Salvador, a country in Central America. Most Salvadorans live in El Salvador, although there is also a significant Salvadoran diaspora, particularly in the United States, with smaller communities in other countries around the world.

El Salvador's population was 6,218,000 in 2010, compared to 2,200,000 in 1950. In 2010, the percentage of the population below the age of 15 was 32.1%, 61% were between 15 and 65 years of age, while 6.9% were 65 years or older.

== Demonym ==
Although not the academic standard, Salvadorian and Salvadorean are widely-used English demonyms used by those living in the United States and other English-speaking countries. All three versions of the word can be seen in most Salvadoran business signs in the United States and elsewhere in the world.

Centroamericano/a in Spanish and in English Central American is an alternative standard and widespread cultural identity term that Salvadorans use to identify themselves, along with their regional isthmian neighbors. It is a secondary demonym and it is widely used as an interchangeable term for El Salvador and Salvadorans. The demonym Central American is an allusion to the strong union that the Central America region has had since its independence. The term Central America is not only a regional cultural identity, but also a political identity, since the region has been united on various occasions as a single country such as the United Provinces of Central America, Federal Republic of Central America, National Representation of Central America, and Greater Republic of Central America. The same can be said for El Salvador's neighbors, specifically the original five states of Central America.

== History ==
=== Lithic era ===
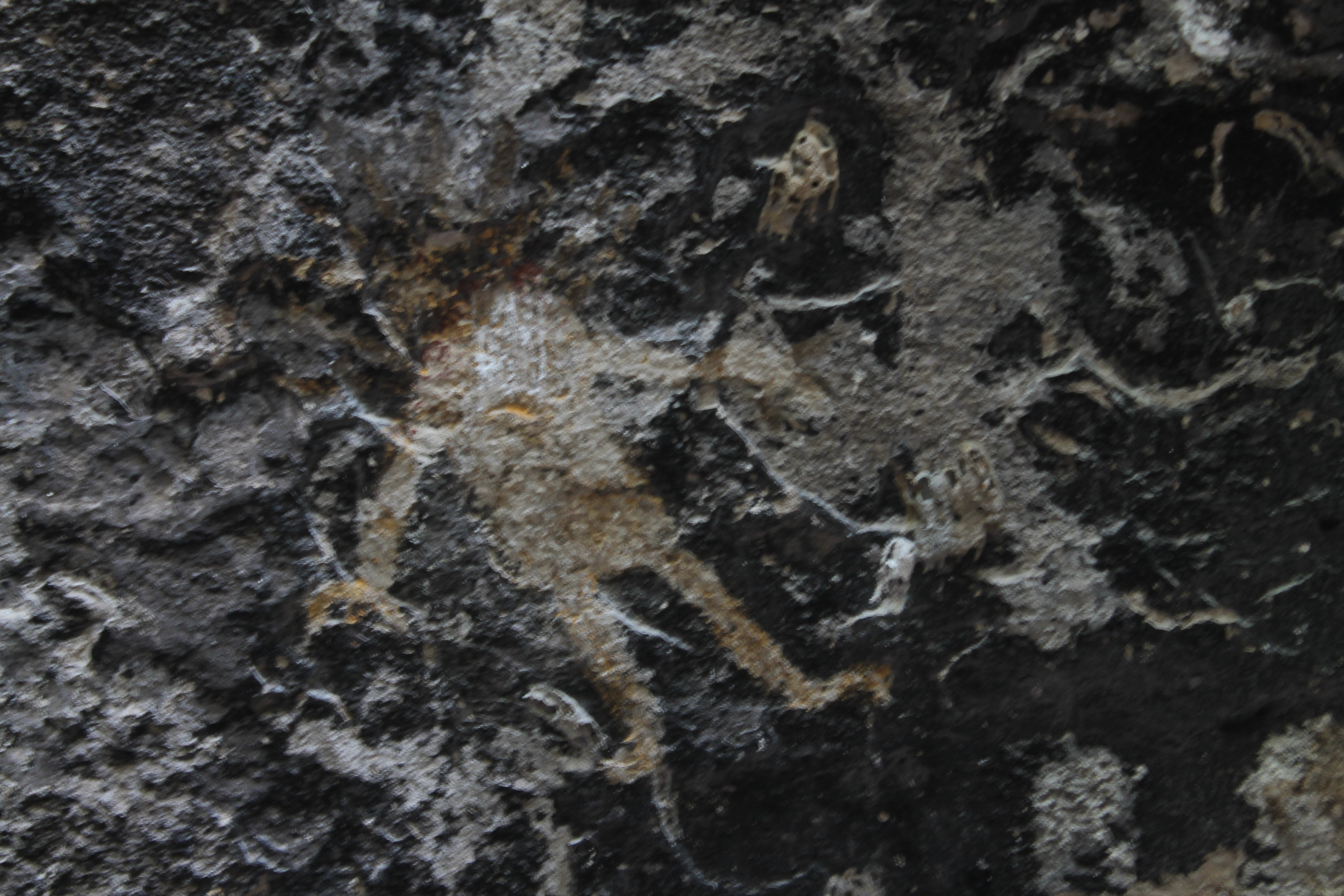
Humanoid petroglyph in Holy Spirit Grotto (corinto cave), Morazán, El Salvador.

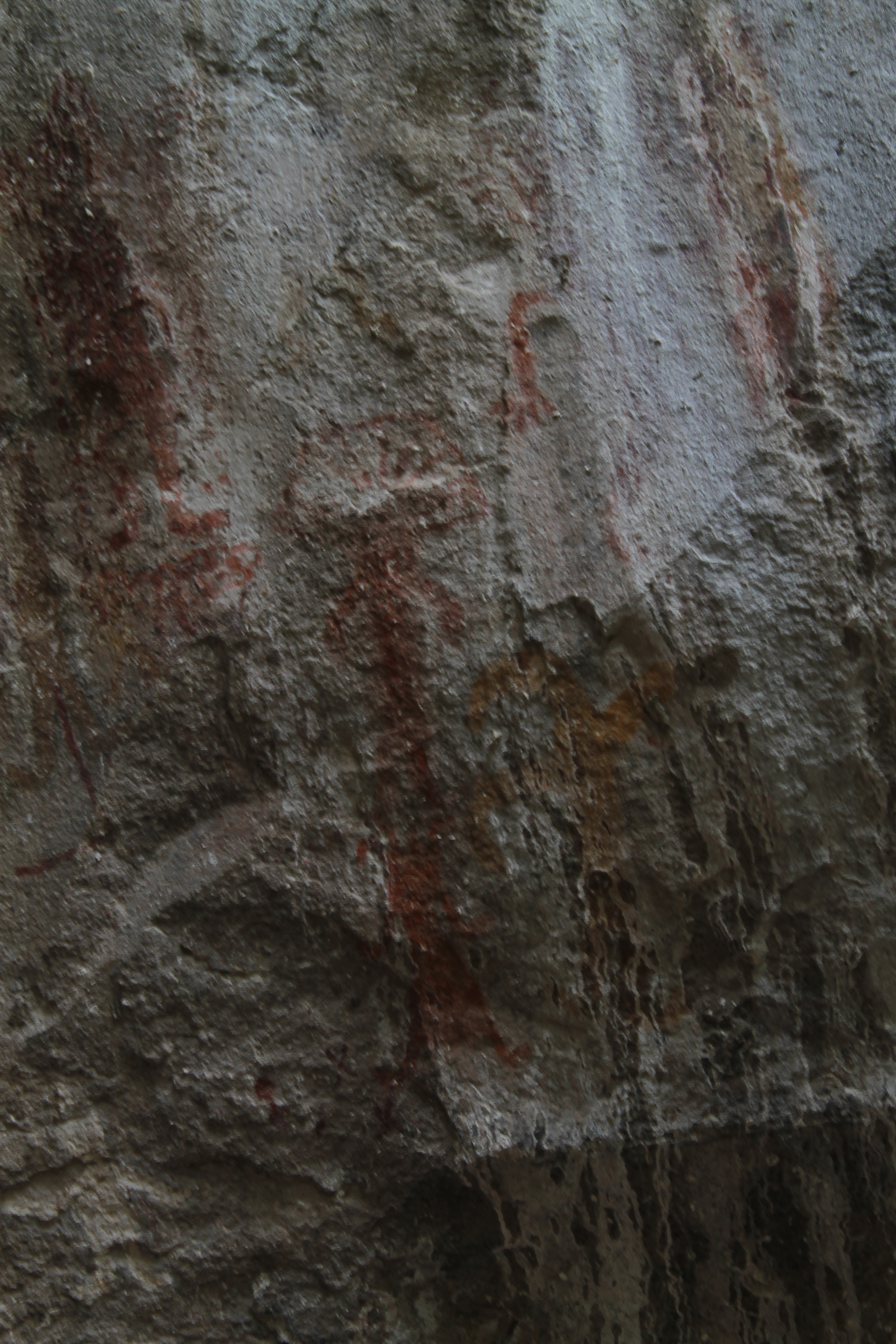
Petroglyphs in Holy Spirit Grotto (corinto cave), Morazán, El Salvador.

El Salvador was inhabited by Paleo-Indians, the first peoples who subsequently inhabited, the Americas during the glacial episodes of the late Pleistocene period. Their paintings (the earliest of which date from 8000 BC) can still be seen in caves outside the towns of Corinto and Cacaopera, both in Morazán. Originating in the Paleolithic period, these cave paintings exhibit the earliest traces of human life in El Salvador; these early Native Americans people used the cave as a refuge, Paleoindian artists created cave and rock paintings that are located in present-day El Salvador.

The Lencas later occupied the caves and utilized them as spiritual spaces. Other ancient petroglyphs are located in San José Villanueva, La Libertad and San Isidro, Cabañas. The rock petroglyphs in San Jose Villanueva near a cave in Walter Thilo Deininger National Park are similar to other ancient rock petroglyph around the country. Regarding the style of the engravings, it has been compared with the petroglyphs of La Peña Herrada (Cuscatlán), el Letrero del Diablo (La Libertad) and la Peña de los Fierros (San Salvador). Other cave locations include the cave of Los Fierros and La Cuevona, both in Cuscatlán.

=== Archaic Period ===
Native Americans appeared in the Pleistocene era and became the dominant people in the Lithic stage, developing in the Archaic period in North America to the Formative stage, occupying this phase for thousands of years until European contact at the end of 16th century, spanning from the time of the arrival to the Upper Paleolithic era to European colonization of the Americas during the early modern period.

=== Mesoamerican cultures ===
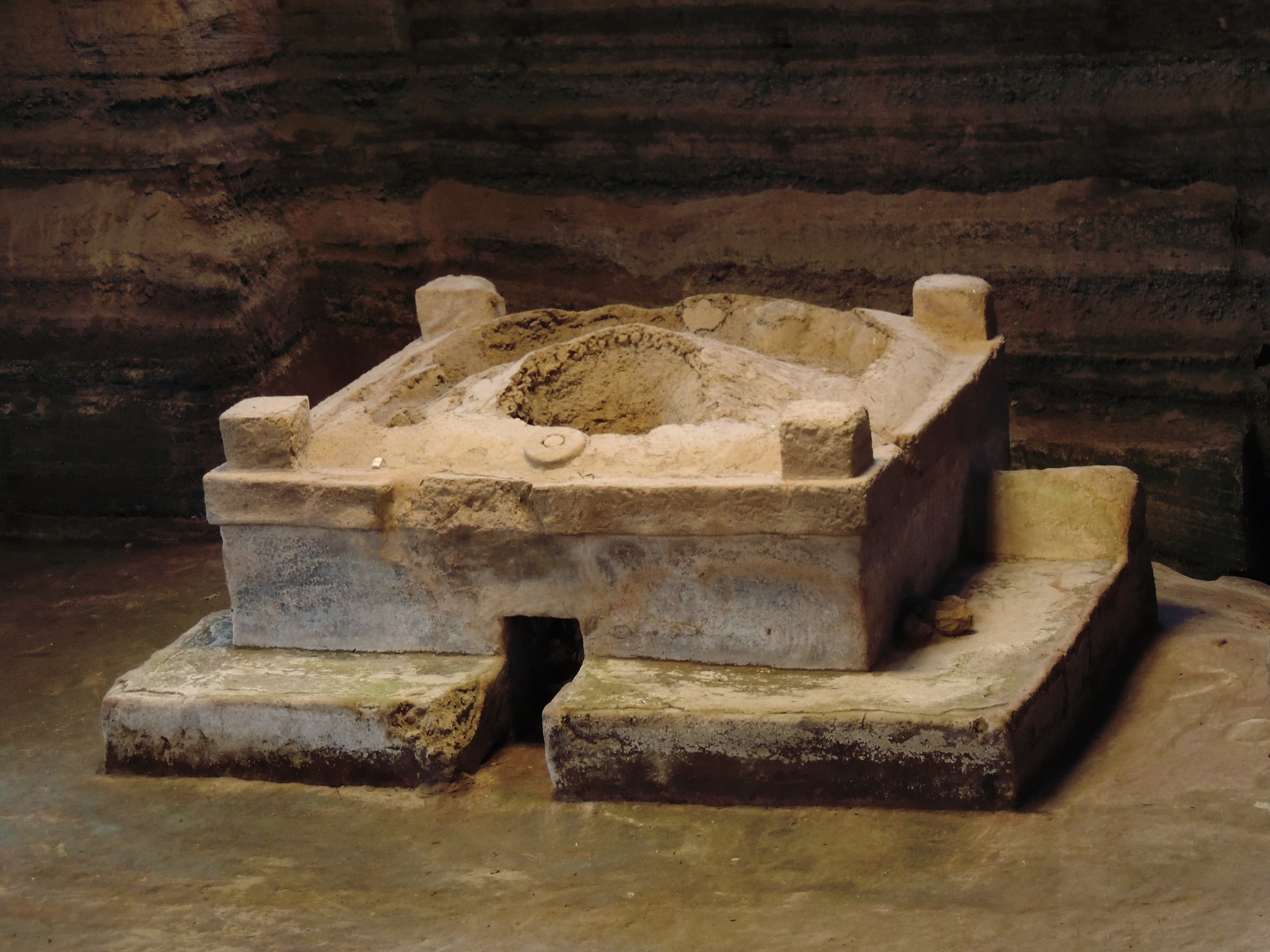
Joya de Cerén

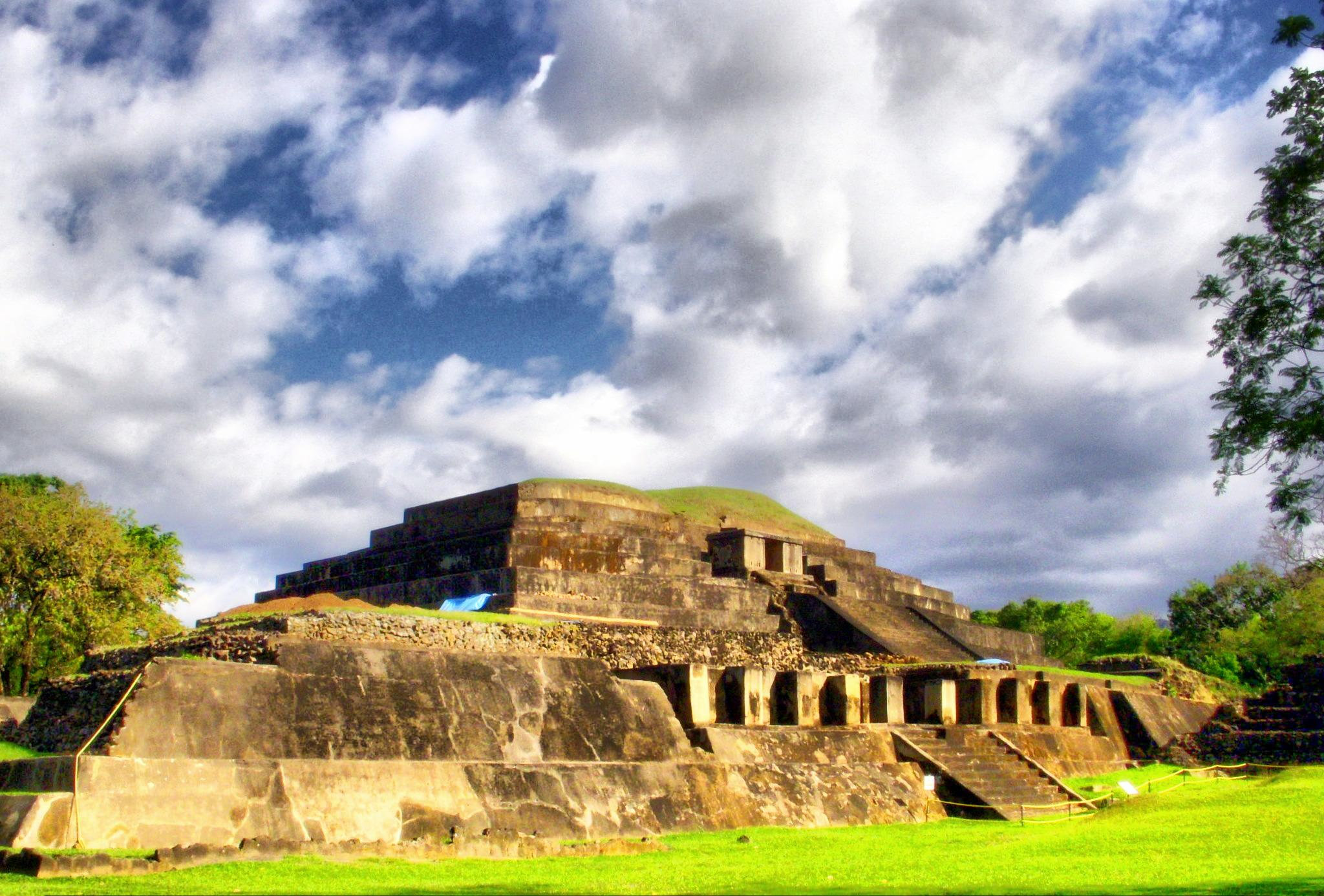
Tazumal

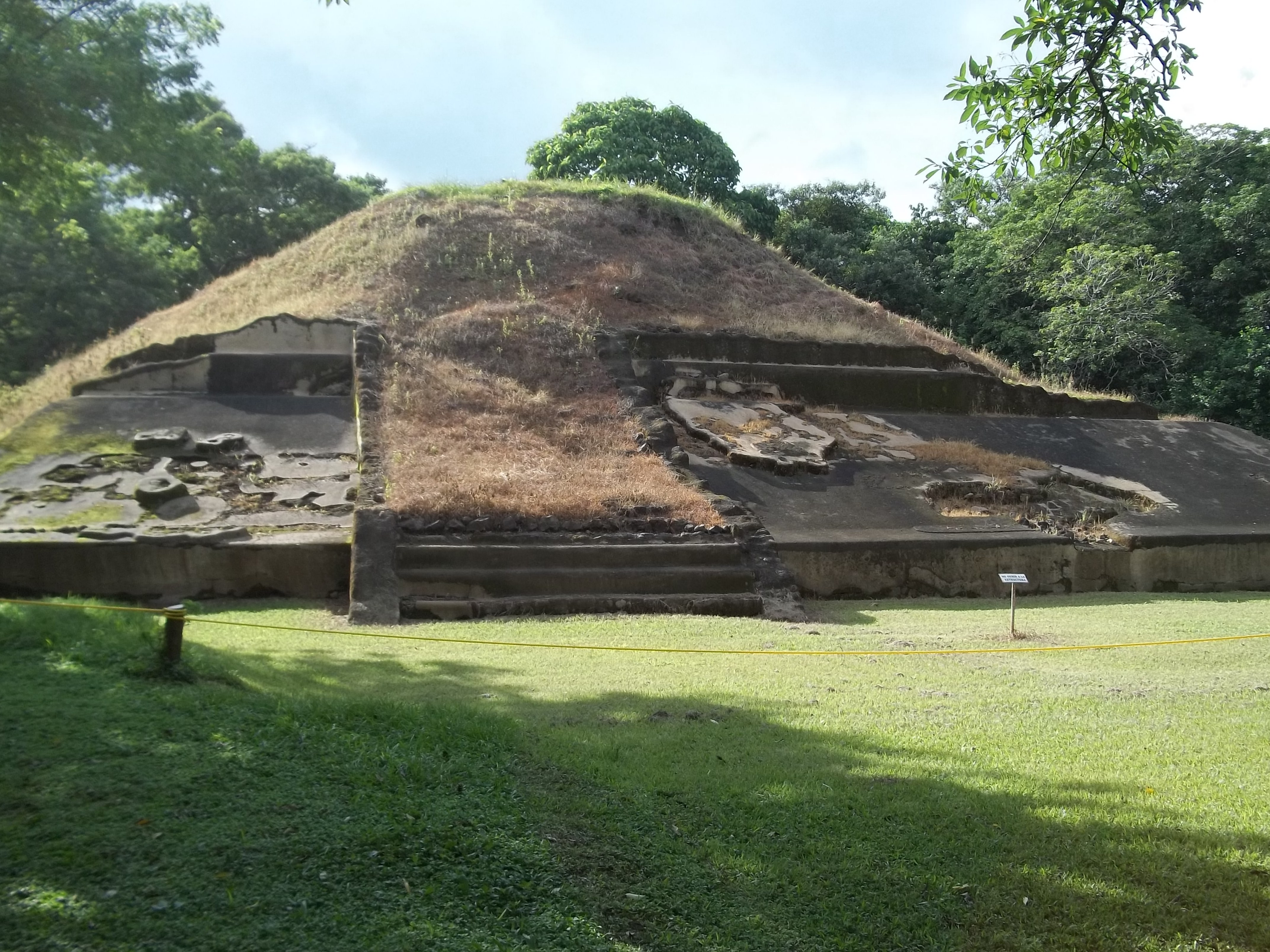
Casa Blanca

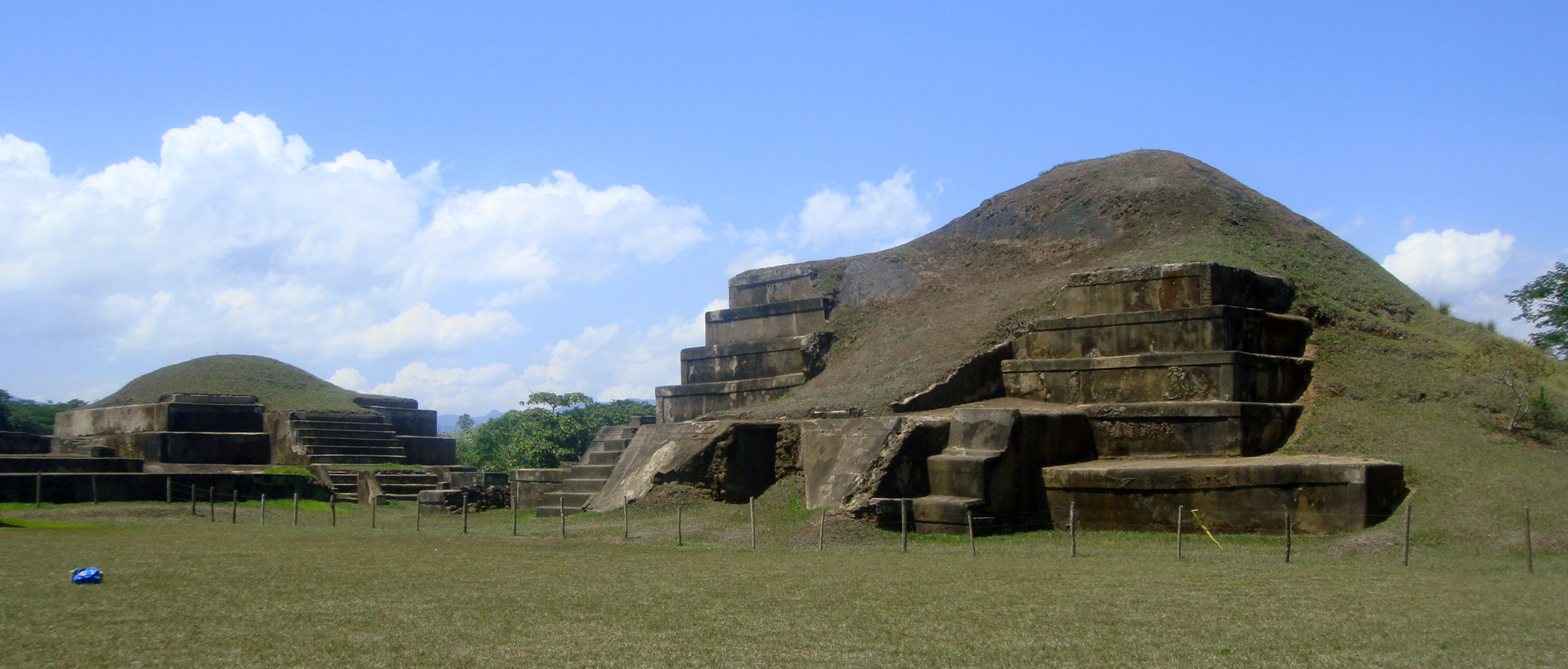
San Andrés

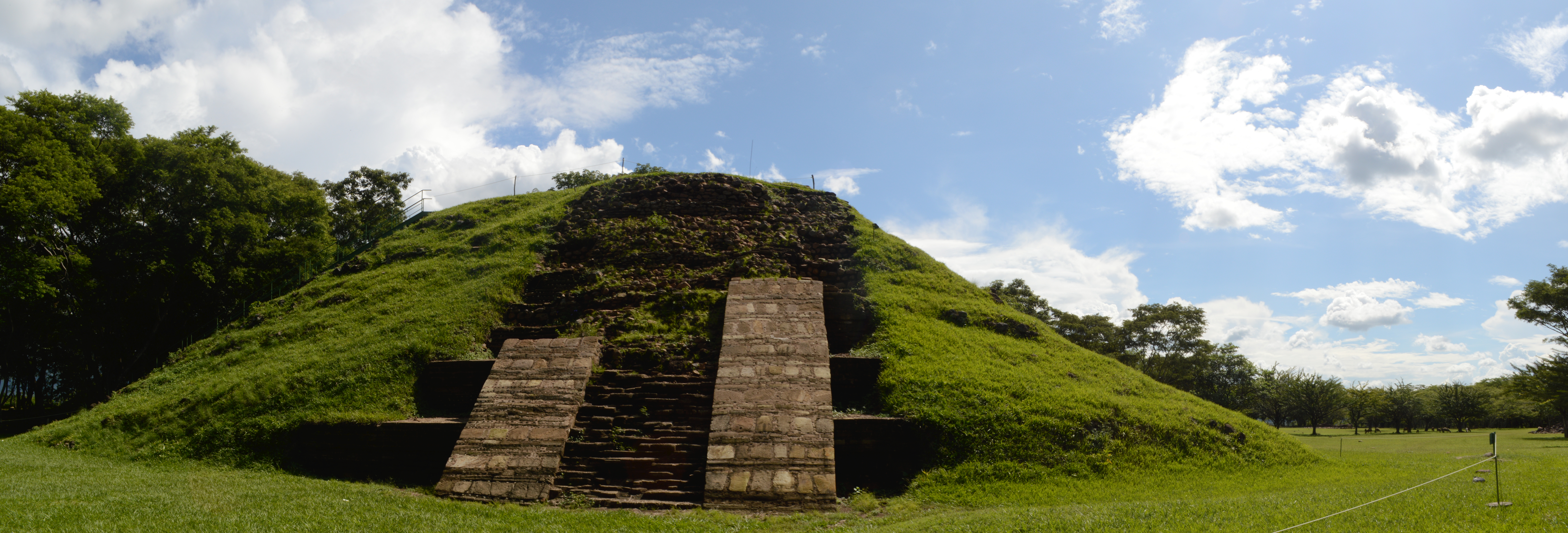
Cihuatán

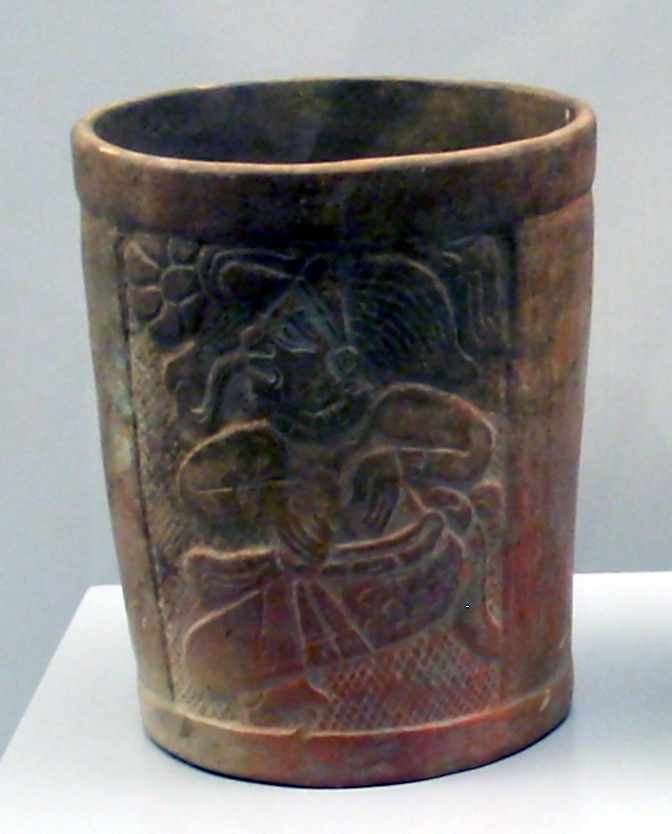
Late Classic Maya cup from El Salvador. 600–900 AD.

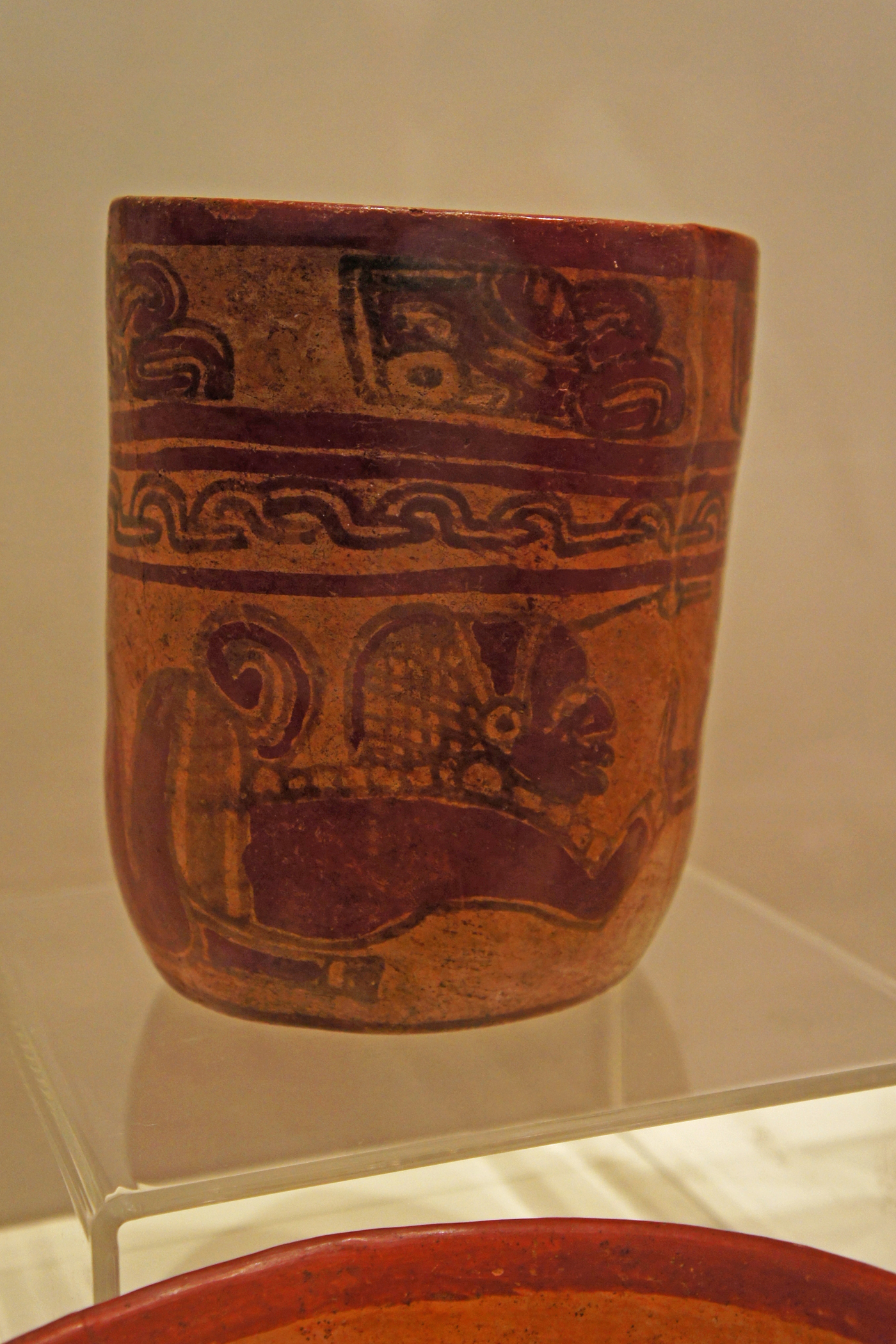
Mayan artifact found at the Joya de Cerén archaeological site

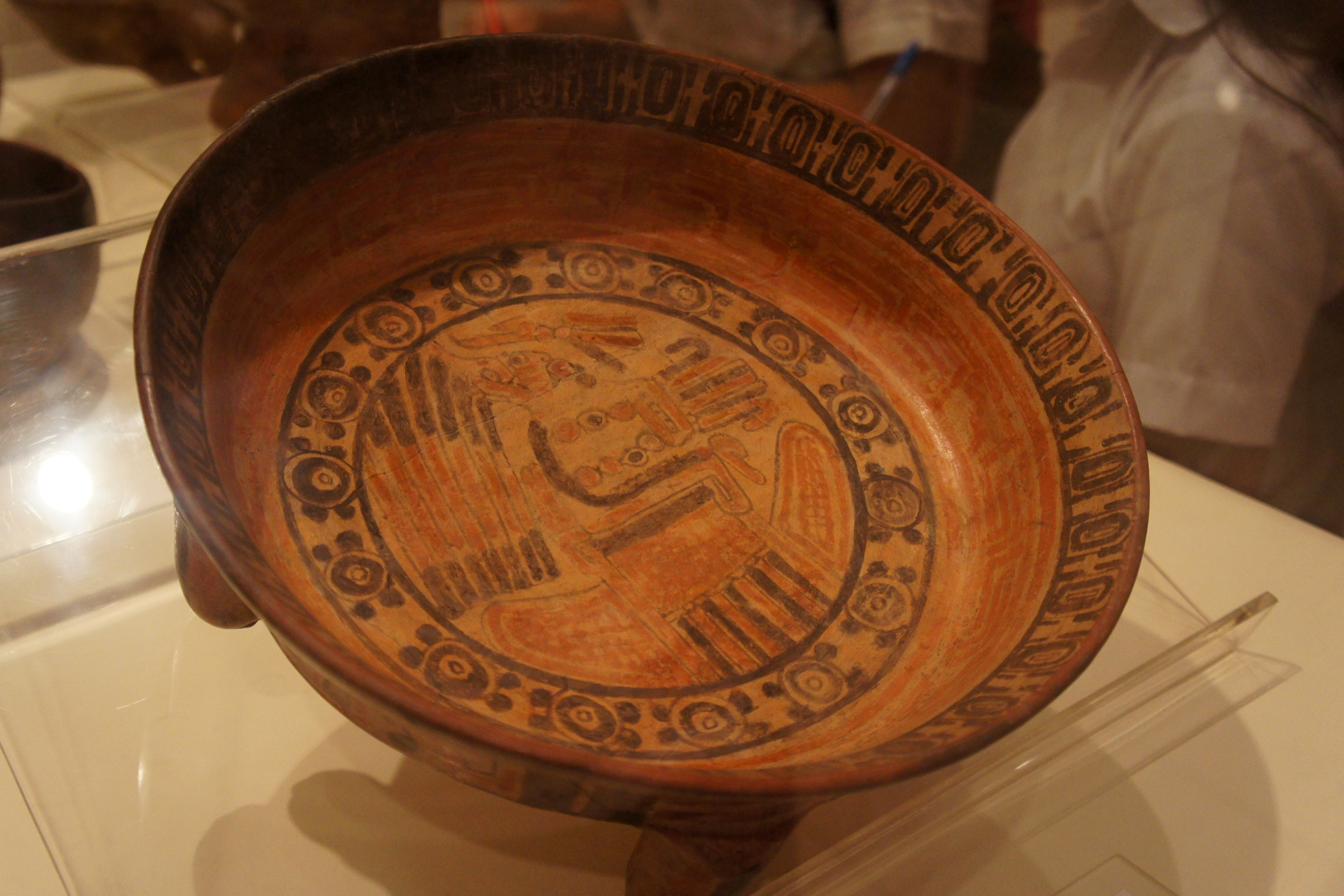
Mayan artifact found at the Joya de Cerén archaeological site

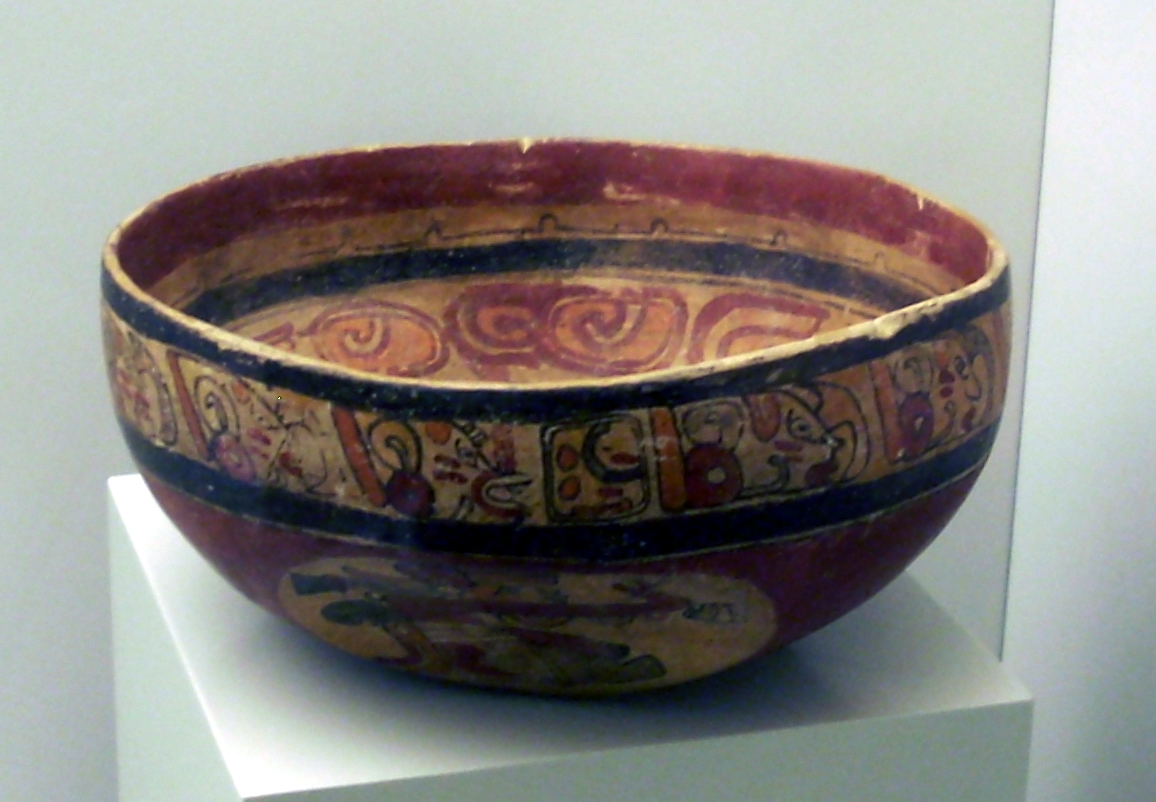
Late Classic Maya bowl, El Copador style, El Salvador.

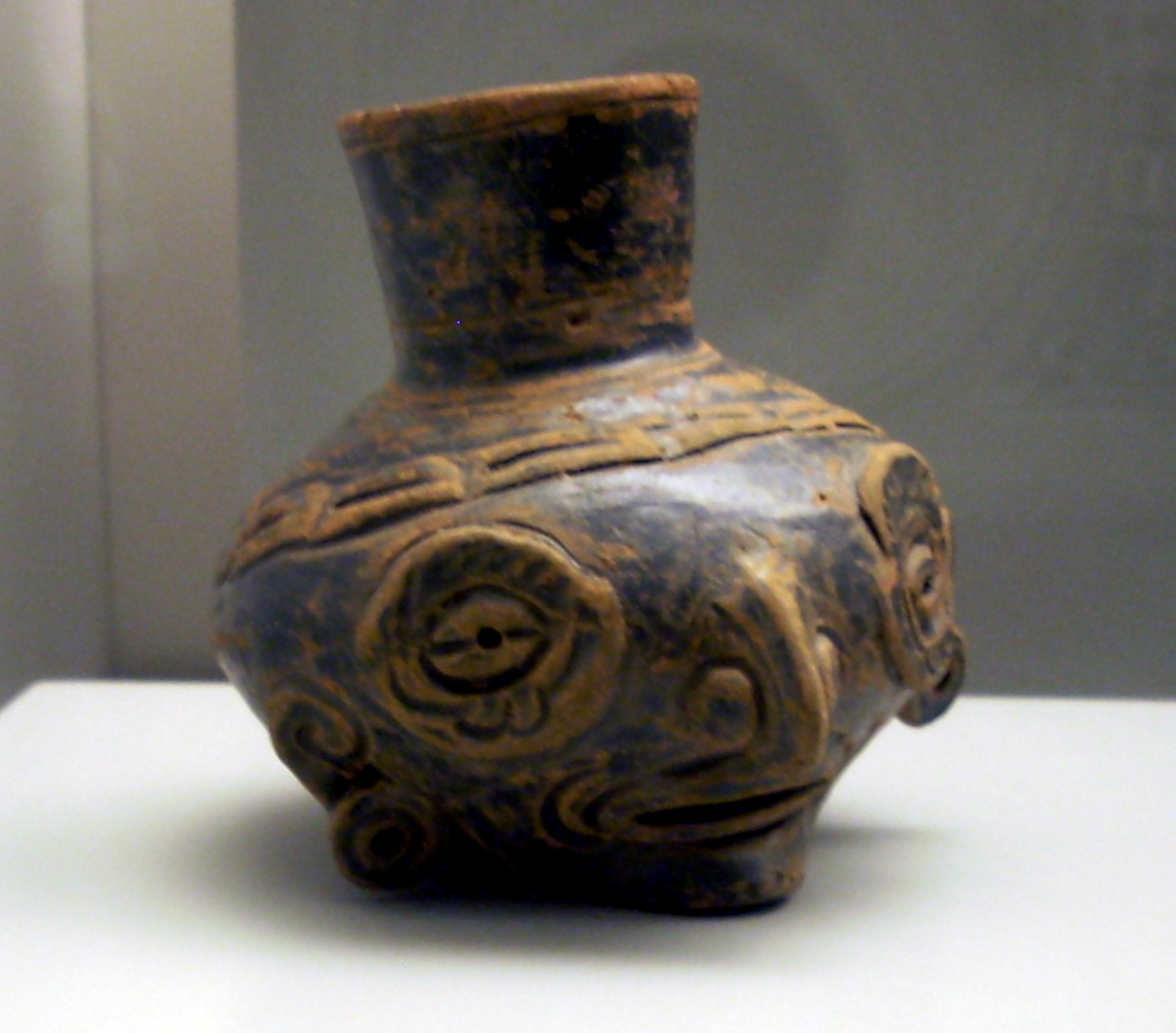
Late Postclassic ceramic vessel from El Salvador, with face decoration. 1200–1520 AD.

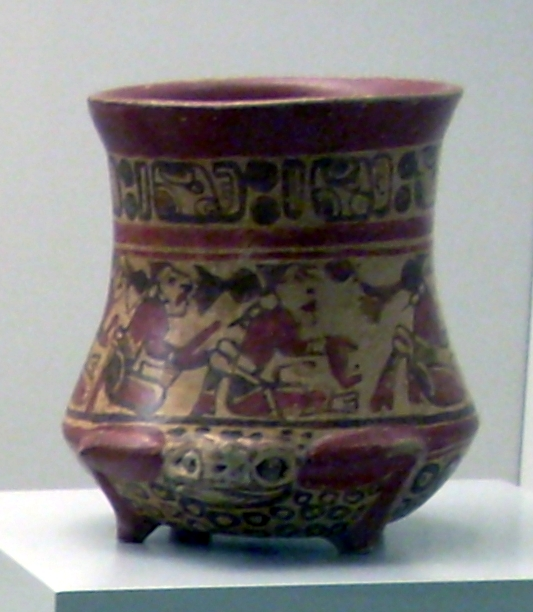
Late Classic Maya vessel from El Salvador, 600–900 AD

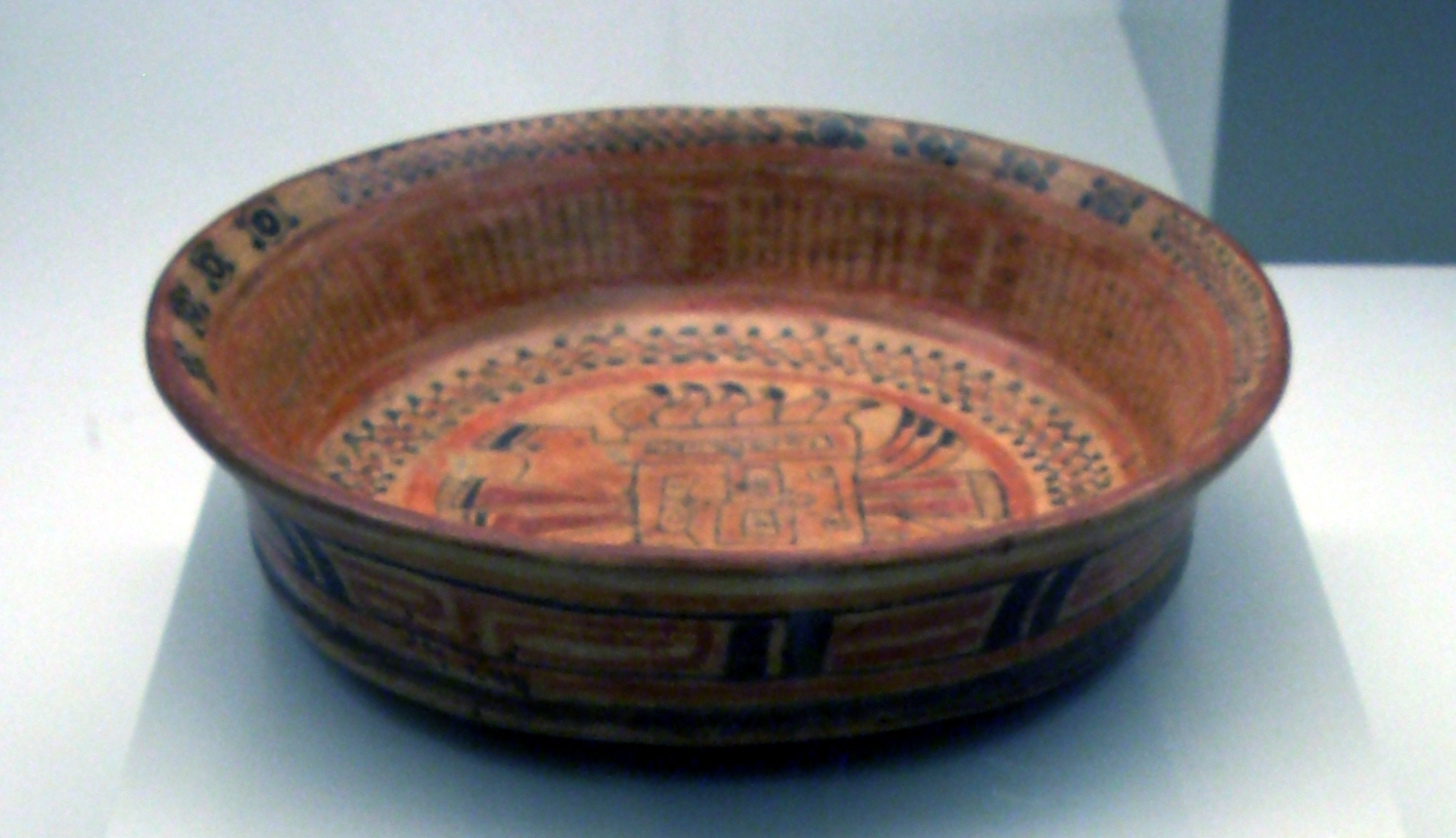
Late Classic Maya plate, El Salvador.

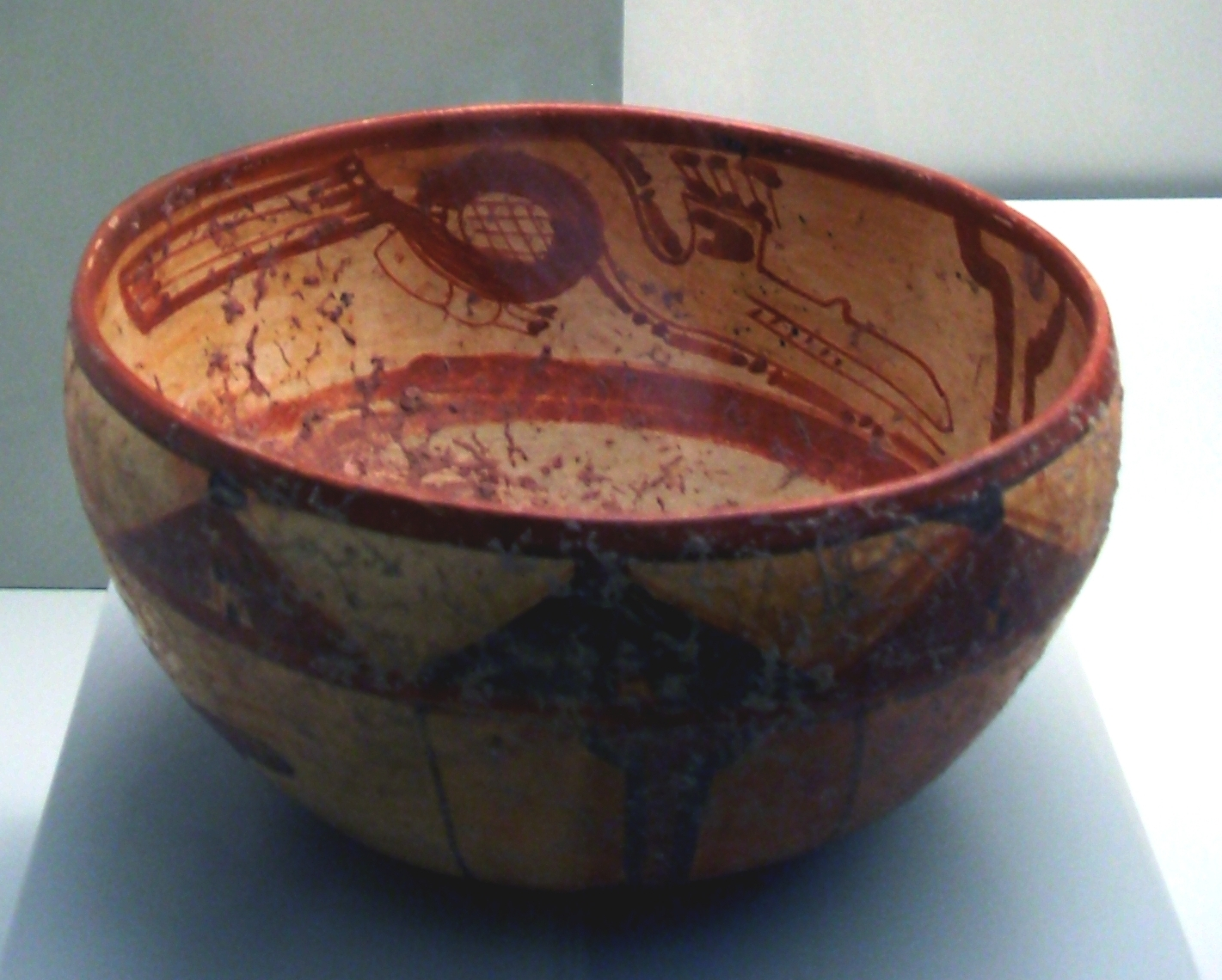
Late Classic Maya bowl from El Salvador.

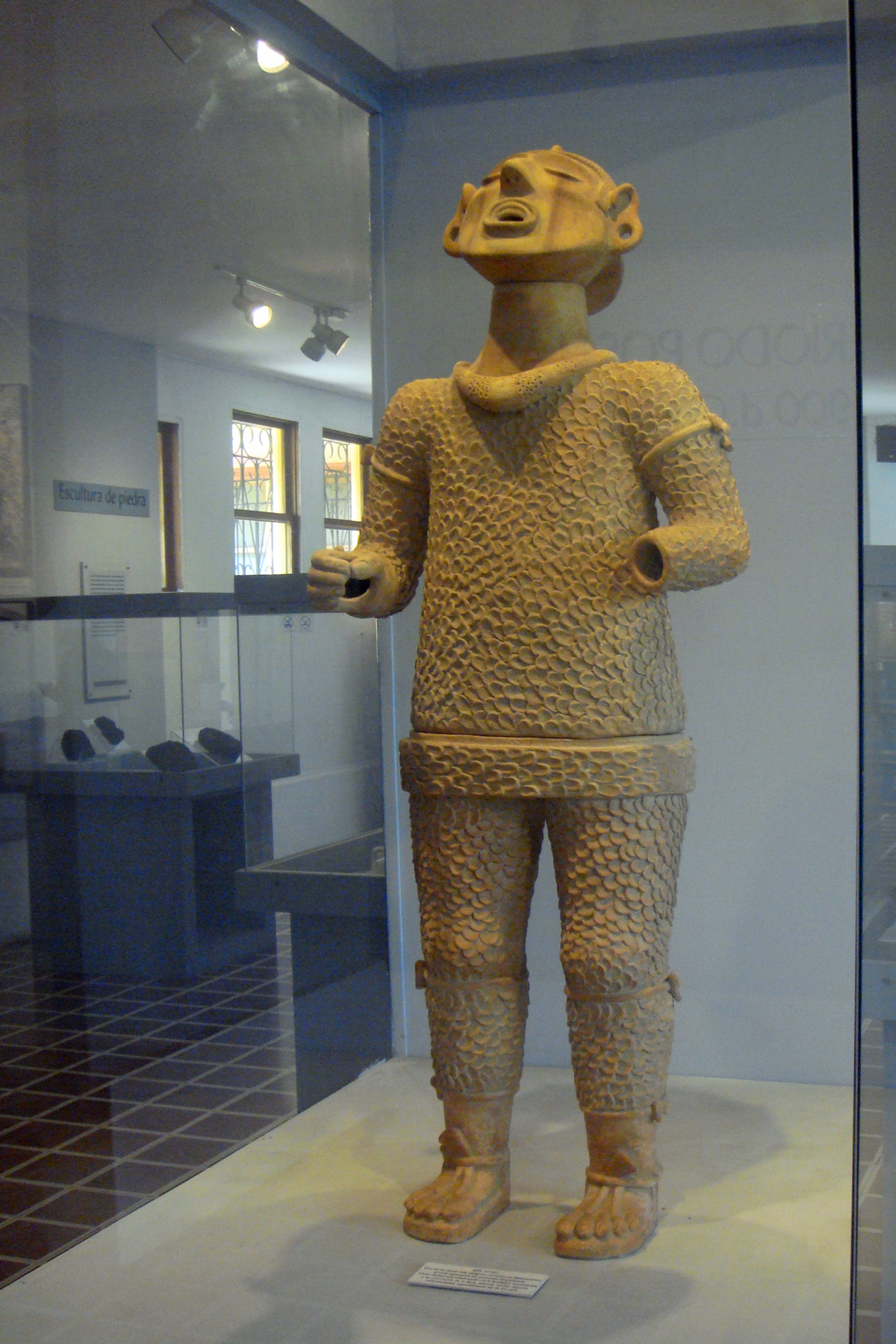
Tazumal's Xipe Totec.

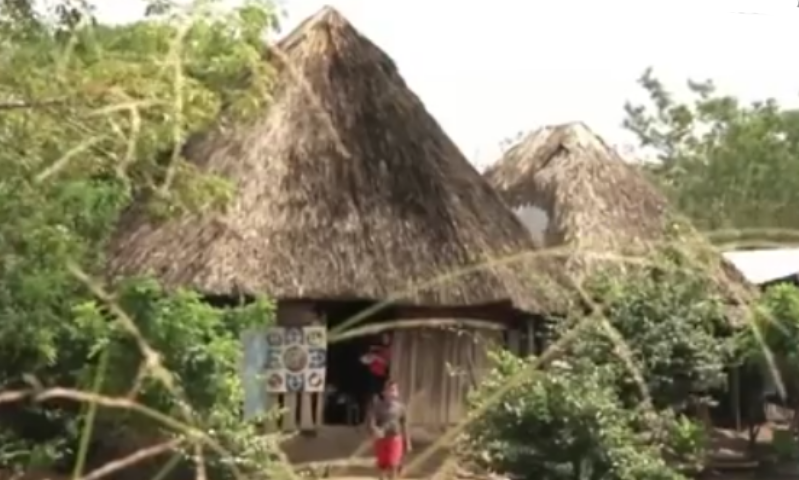
Typical traditional indigenous houses, Ahuachapán

Historically El Salvador has had diverse Native American cultures, coming from the north and south of the continent along with local populations mixed together. El Salvador belongs to the Mesoamerican region, where a myriad of indigenous societies have lived side by side for centuries with their unique cultures and speaking different indigenous languages of the Americas in the beginning of the Formative stage.

Evidence of Olmec civilization presence in western El Salvador can be found in the ruin sites of Chalchuapa in the Ahuachapan Department on boulders in Chalchuapa portraying Olmec warriors with helmets identical to those found on the Olmec colossal heads. This suggest that the area was once an Olmec enclave, before fading away for unknown reasons. The Olmecs are believed to have lived in present-day El Salvador as early as 2000 BC in the beginning of preclassic period. The 'Olmec Boulder, ' is a sculpture of a giant head found near Casa Blanca, El Salvador site in Las Victorias near Chalchuapa. "Olmecoid" figurines, such as the Potbelly sculpture, have been found through this area, in fact most are described as looking primeval proto-Olmeca. In the end of middle preclassic, by 650 BC, this culture would be replaced by the Maya.

The Lenca people are an indigenous people of eastern El Salvador where population today is estimated at about 37,000. The Lenca was a matriarchal society and was one of the first civilizations to develop in El Salvador and were the first major civilization in the country. The pre-Conquest Salvadoran Lenca had frequent contact with various Maya groups as well as other indigenous peoples of Central America. The origin of Lenca populations has been a source of ongoing debate amongst anthropologists and historians. Throughout the regions of Lenca occupation, Lenca pottery is a very distinguishable form of Pre-Columbian art. Handcrafted by Lenca women, Lenca pottery is considered an ethnic marking of their culture. Some scholars have suggested that the Lenca migrated to the Central American region from South America around 3,000 years ago, making it the oldest civilization in El Salvador. Guancasco is the annual ceremony by which Lenca communities, usually two, gather to establish reciprocal obligations in order to confirm peace and friendship. Quelepa is a major site in eastern El Salvador. Its pottery shows strong similarities to ceramics found in central western El Salvador and the Maya highlands. The Lenca sites of Yarumela, Los Naranjos in Honduras, and Quelepa in El Salvador, all contain evidence of the Usulután-style ceramics.

The Cacaopera people are an indigenous people in El Salvador who are also known as the Matagalpa or Ulua. Cacaopera people spoke the Cacaopera language, a Misumalpan language. Cacaopera is an extinct language belonging to the Misumalpan family, formerly spoken in the department of Morazán in El Salvador. It was closely related to Matagalpa, and slightly more distantly to Sumo, but was geographically separated from other Misumalpan languages.

The Xinca people, also known as the Xinka, are a non-Mayan indigenous people of Mesoamerica, with communities in the western part of El Salvador near its border. The Xinka may have been among the earliest inhabitants of western El Salvador, predating the arrival of the Maya and the Pipil. The Xinca ethnic group became extinct in the Mestizo process.

El Salvador has two Maya groups, the Poqomam people and the Ch'orti' people. The Poqomam are a Maya people in western El Salvador near its border. Their indigenous language is also called Poqomam. The Ch'orti' people (alternatively, Ch'orti' Maya or Chorti) are one of the indigenous Maya peoples, who primarily reside in communities and towns of northern El Salvador. The Maya once dominated the entire western portion of El Salvador, up until the eruption of the lake ilopango super volcano. Mayan ruins are the most widely conserved in El Salvador and artifacts such as Maya ceramics Mesoamerican writing systems Mesoamerican calendars and Mesoamerican ballgame can be found in all Maya ruins in El Salvador which include Tazumal, San Andrés, El Salvador, Casa Blanca, El Salvador, Cihuatán, and Joya de Cerén.

The Mangue people, also known as Chorotega, spoke the Mangue language, a now-extinct Oto-Manguean language. They occupied land near the eastern El Salvador border, near the gulf.

The Pipil people are an indigenous people who live in western El Salvador. Their language is called Nahuat or Pipil, related to the Toltec people of the Nahua peoples and were speakers of early Nahuatl languages. However, in general, their mythology is more closely related to the Maya mythology, who are their near neighbors and by oral tradition said to have been adopted by Ch'orti' and Poqomam Mayan people during the Pipil exodus in the 9th century CE. The culture lasted until the Spanish conquest, at which time they still maintained their Nawat language, despite being surrounded by the Maya in western El Salvador. By the time the Spanish arrived, Pipil and Poqomam Maya settlements were interspersed throughout western El Salvador. The Pipil are known as the last indigenous civilization to arrive in El Salvador, being the least oldest and were a determined people who stoutly resisted Spanish efforts to extend their dominion southward. The Pipil are direct descendants of the Toltecs, but not of the Aztecs.

=== Spanish conquest (1522) ===
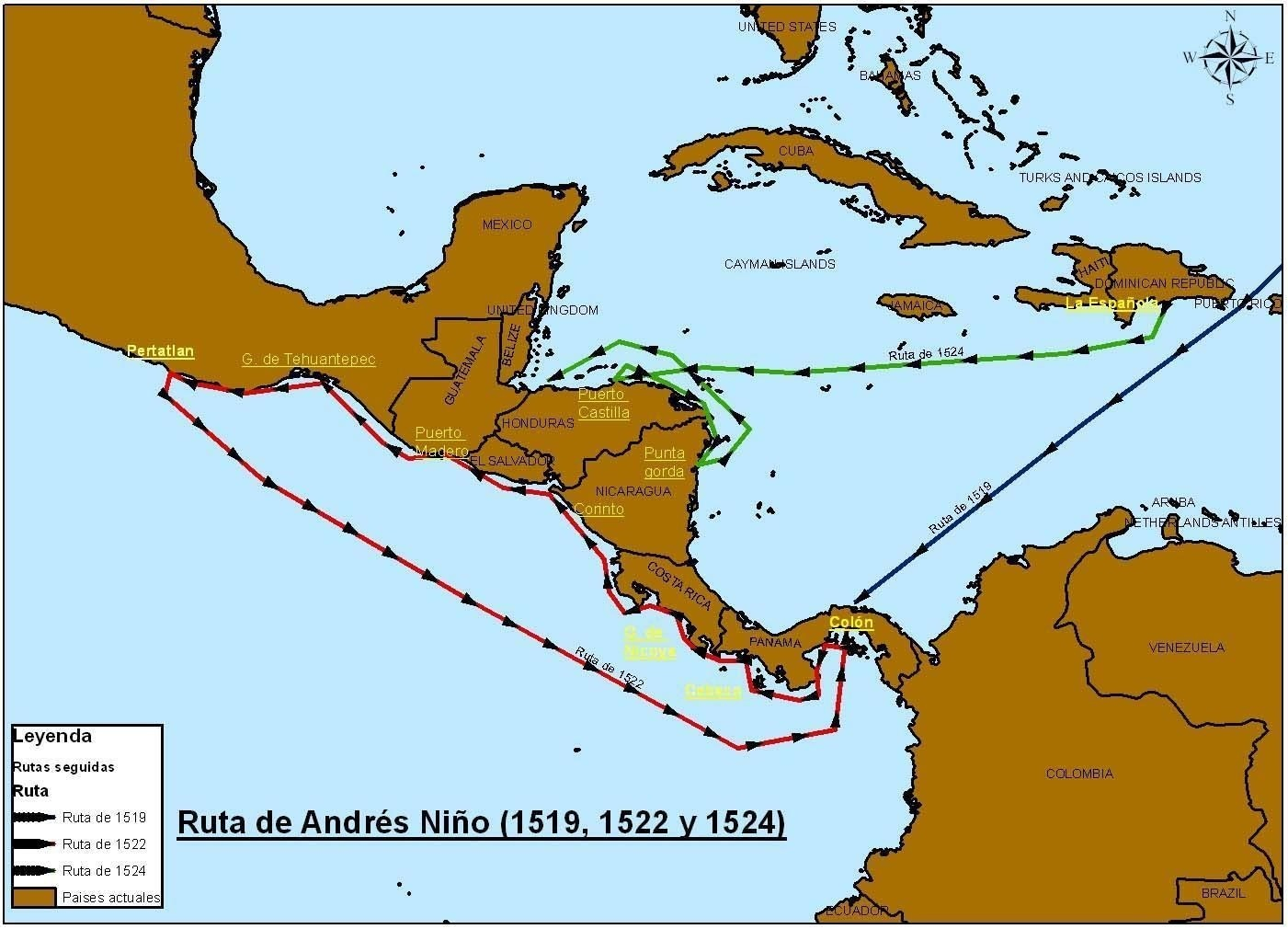
Andrés Niño's route expeditions (1519, 1522 and 1524).

By 1521, the indigenous population of the Mesoamerican area had been drastically reduced by the smallpox epidemic that was spreading throughout the territory, although it had not yet reached pandemic levels in Cuzcatlán or the northern portion Managuara. The first known visit by Spaniards to what is now Salvadoran territory was made by the admiral Andrés Niño, who led an expedition to Central America. He disembarked in the Gulf of Fonseca on 31 May 1522, at Meanguera island, naming it Petronila, and then traversed to Jiquilisco Bay on the mouth of Lempa River. The first indigenous people to have contact with the Spanish were the Lenca of eastern El Salvador.

== Growth of the population ==
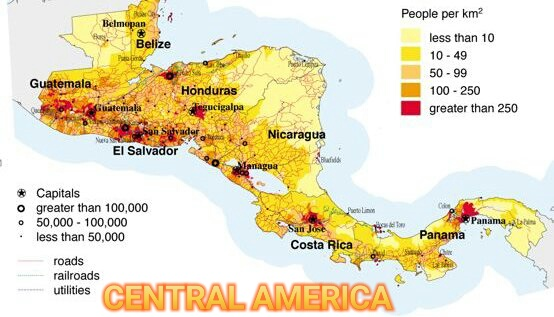
Population density in Central America

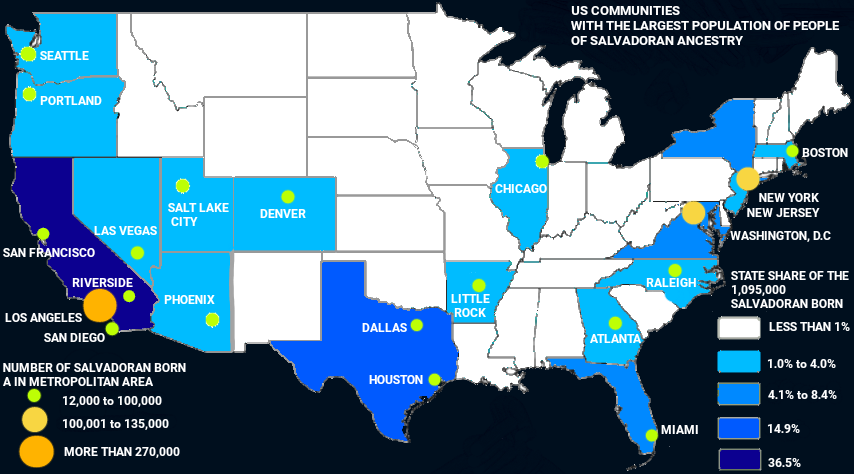
Salvadoran population in the United States

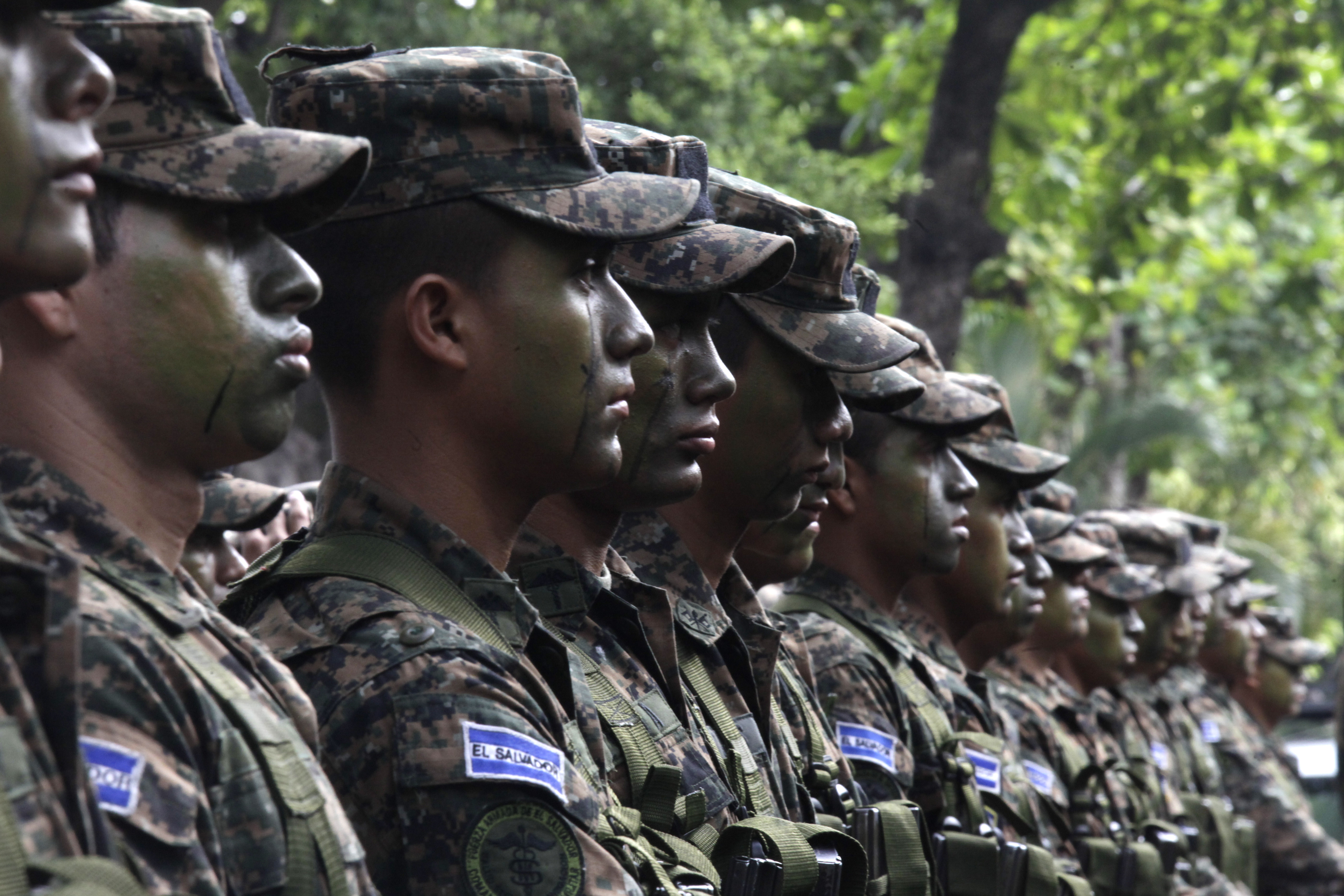
Salvadoran troops

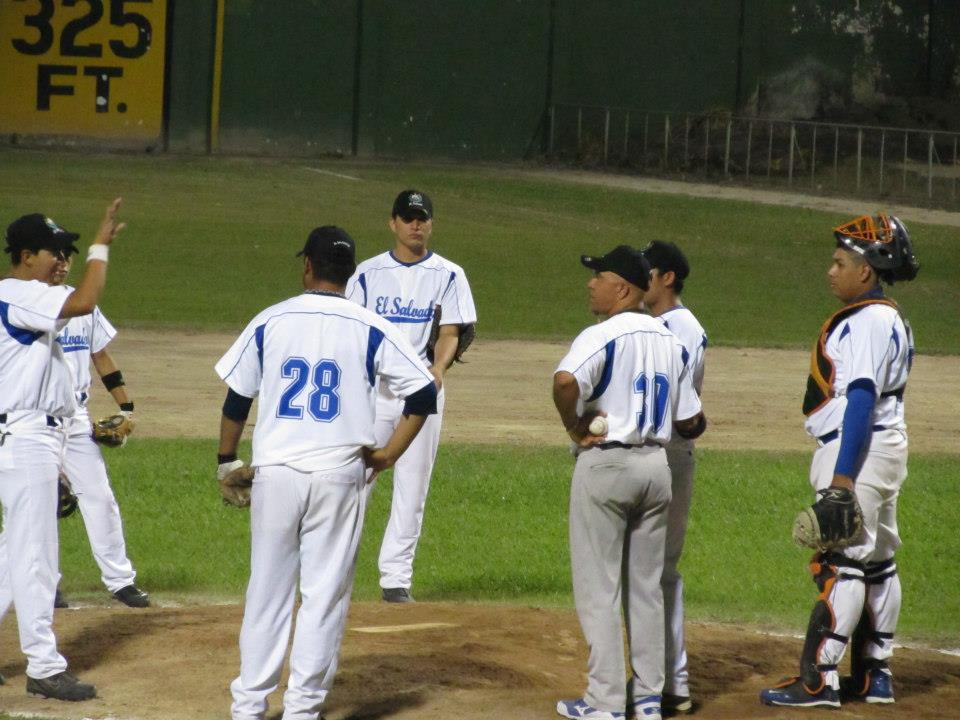
Salvadoran baseball players

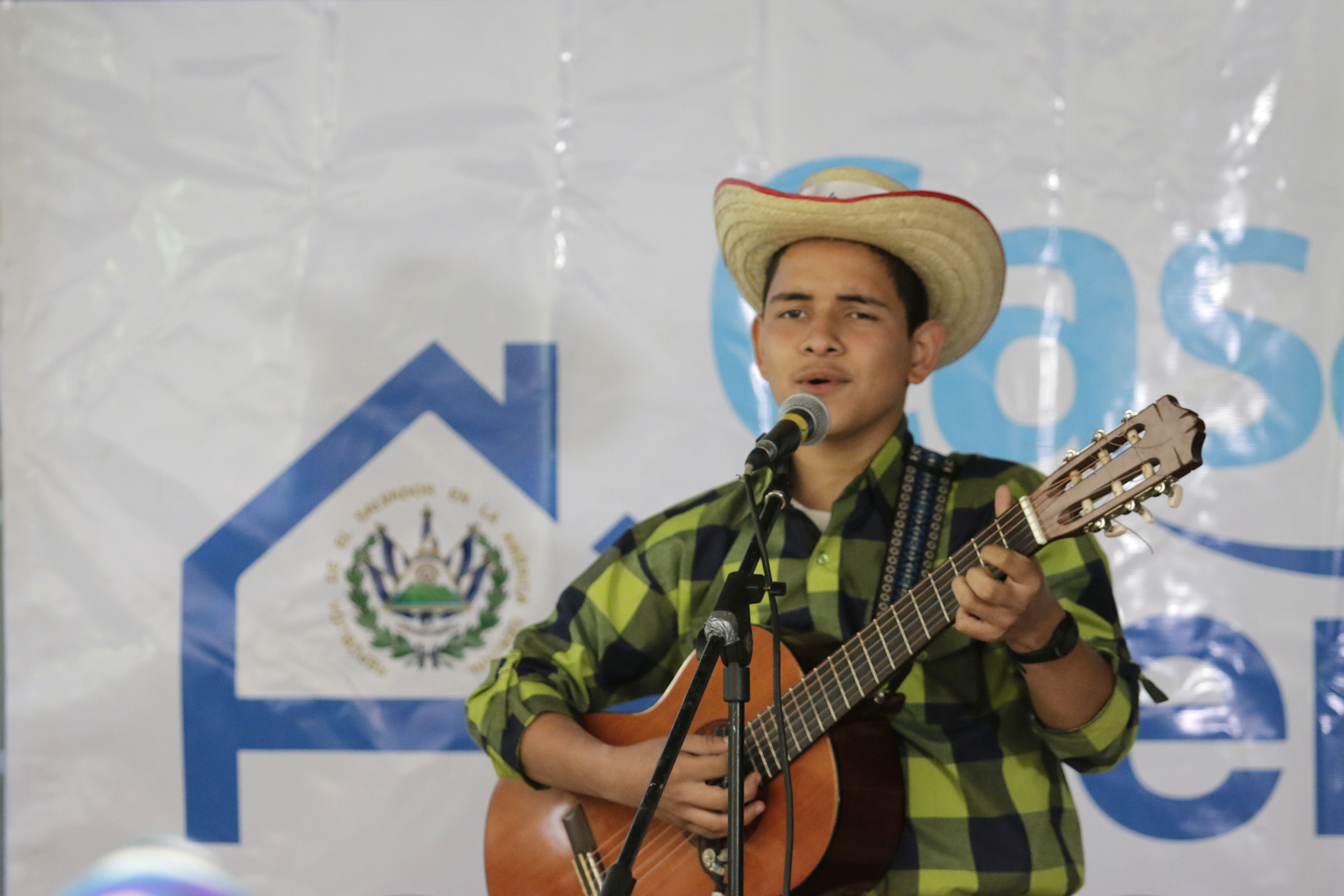
Young Salvadoran man playing a guitar

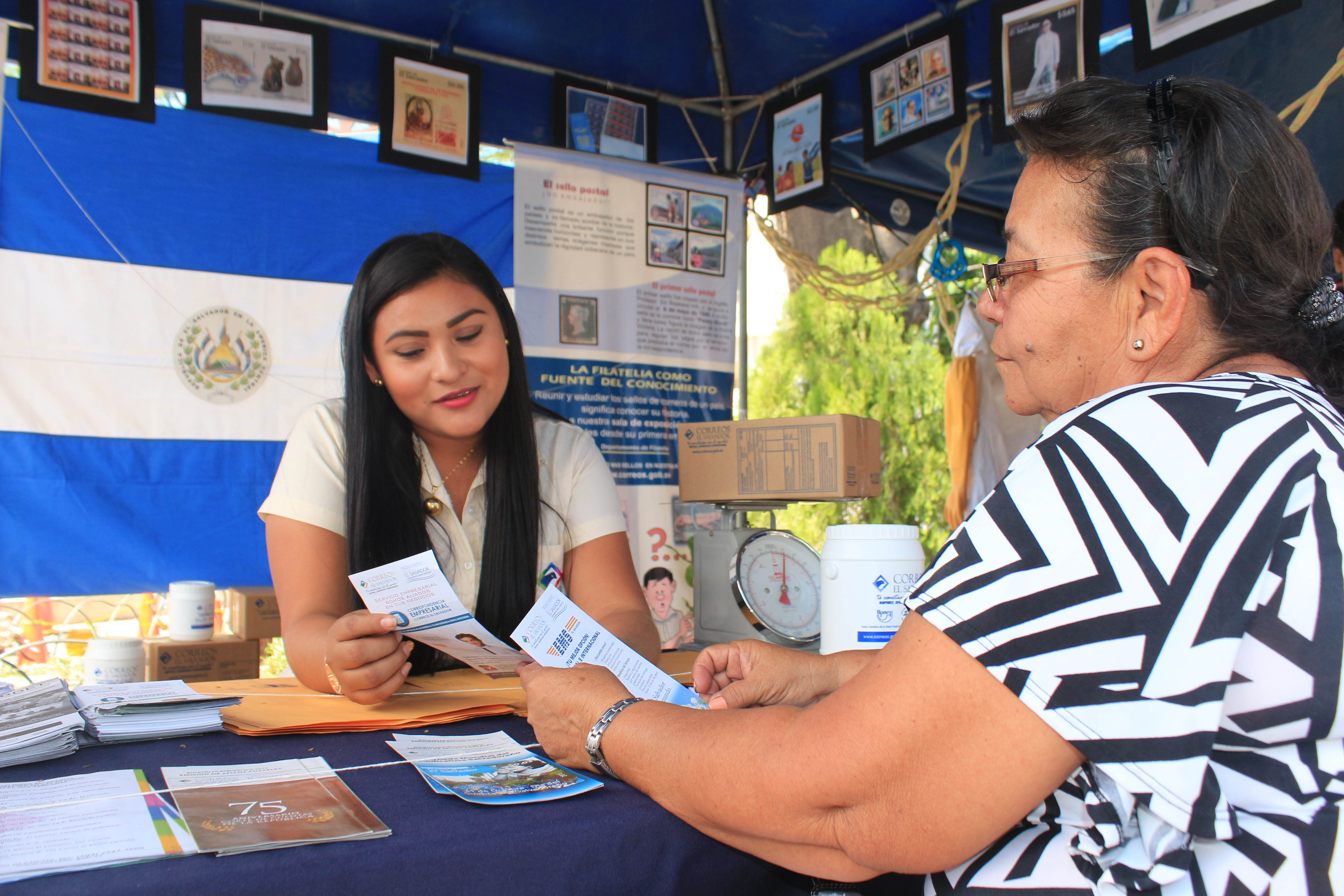
Salvadoran women San Vicente, El Salvador

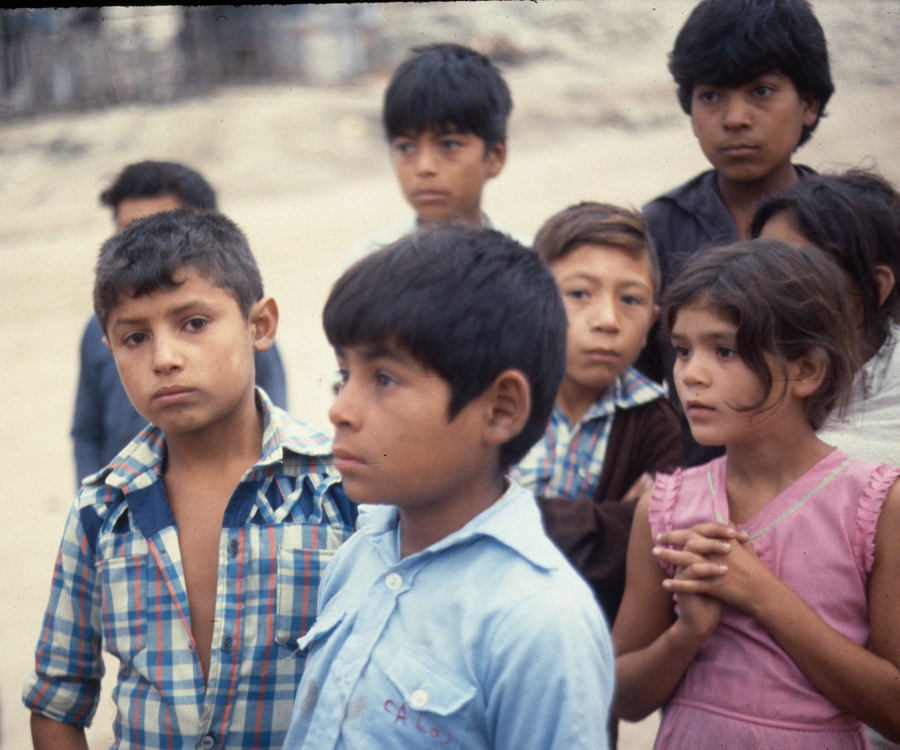
Salvadoran refugee children during the civil war, 1987

Salvadoran boy

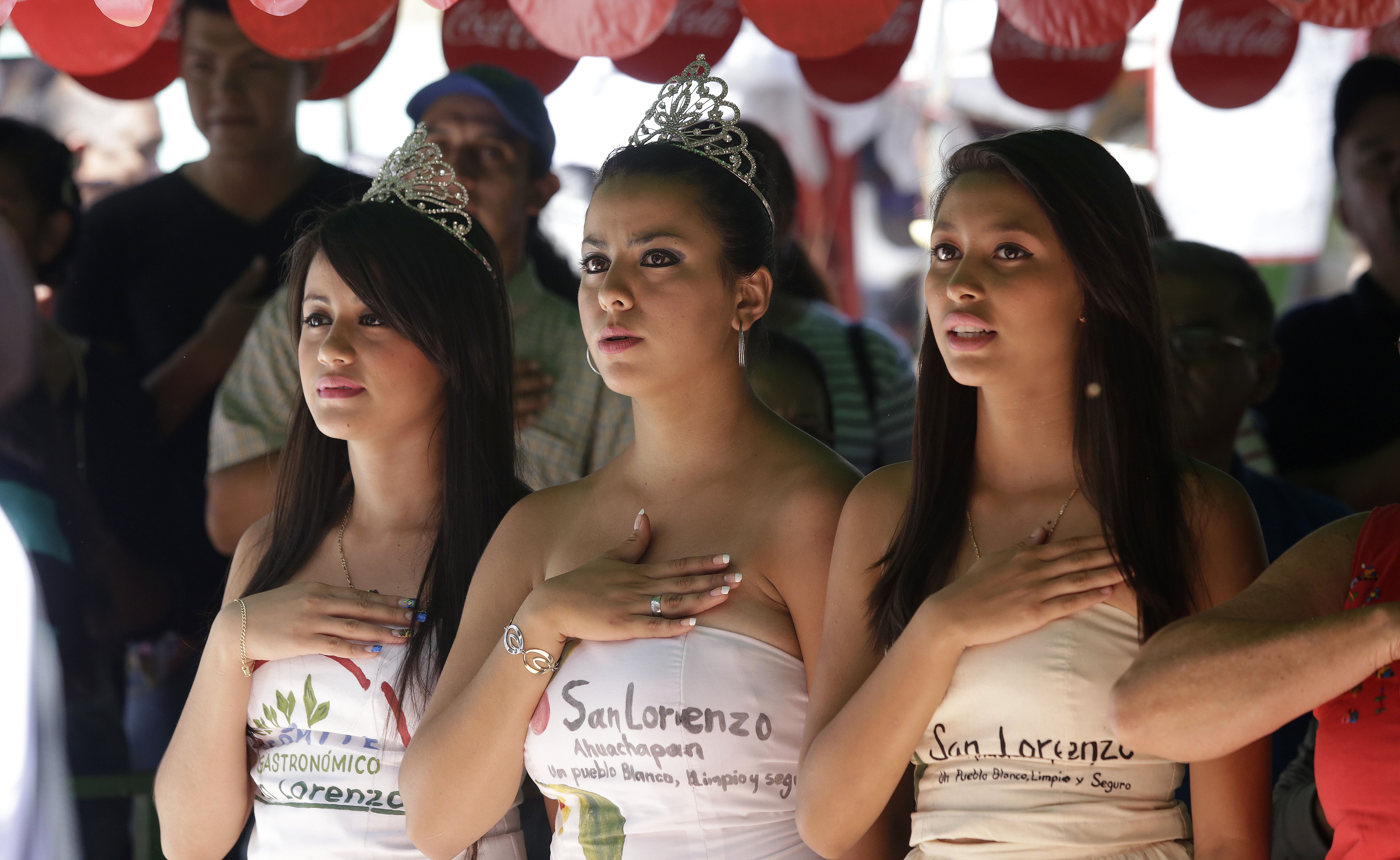
Young Salvadoran women in Ahuachapán

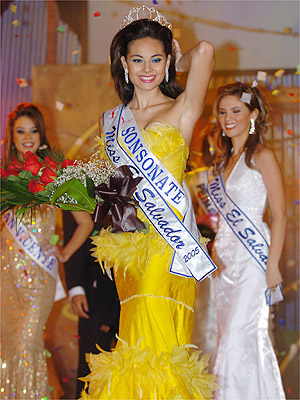
Salvadoran model Irma Dimas from Sonsonate

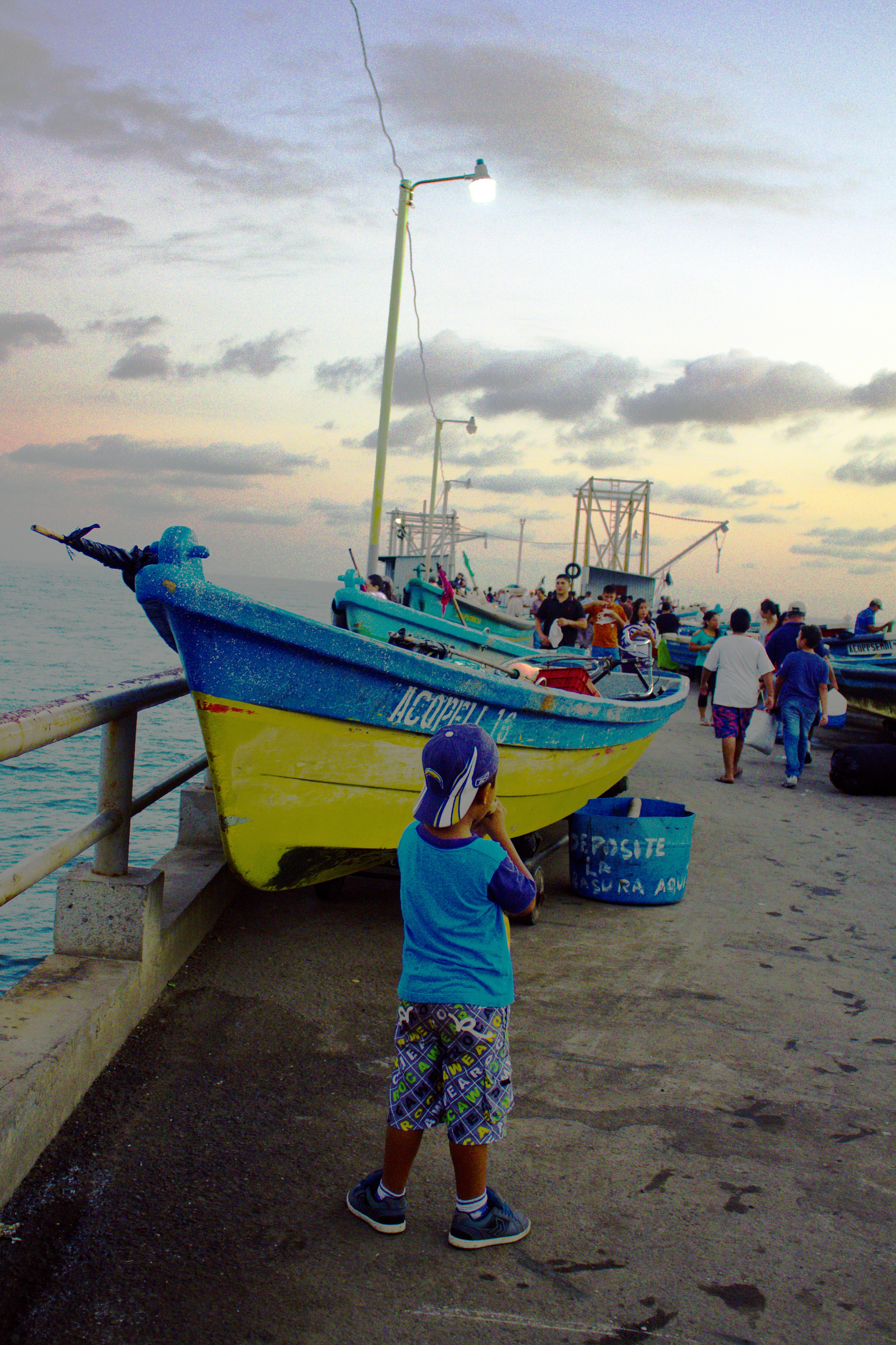
Salvadoran boy in Puerto de La Libertad

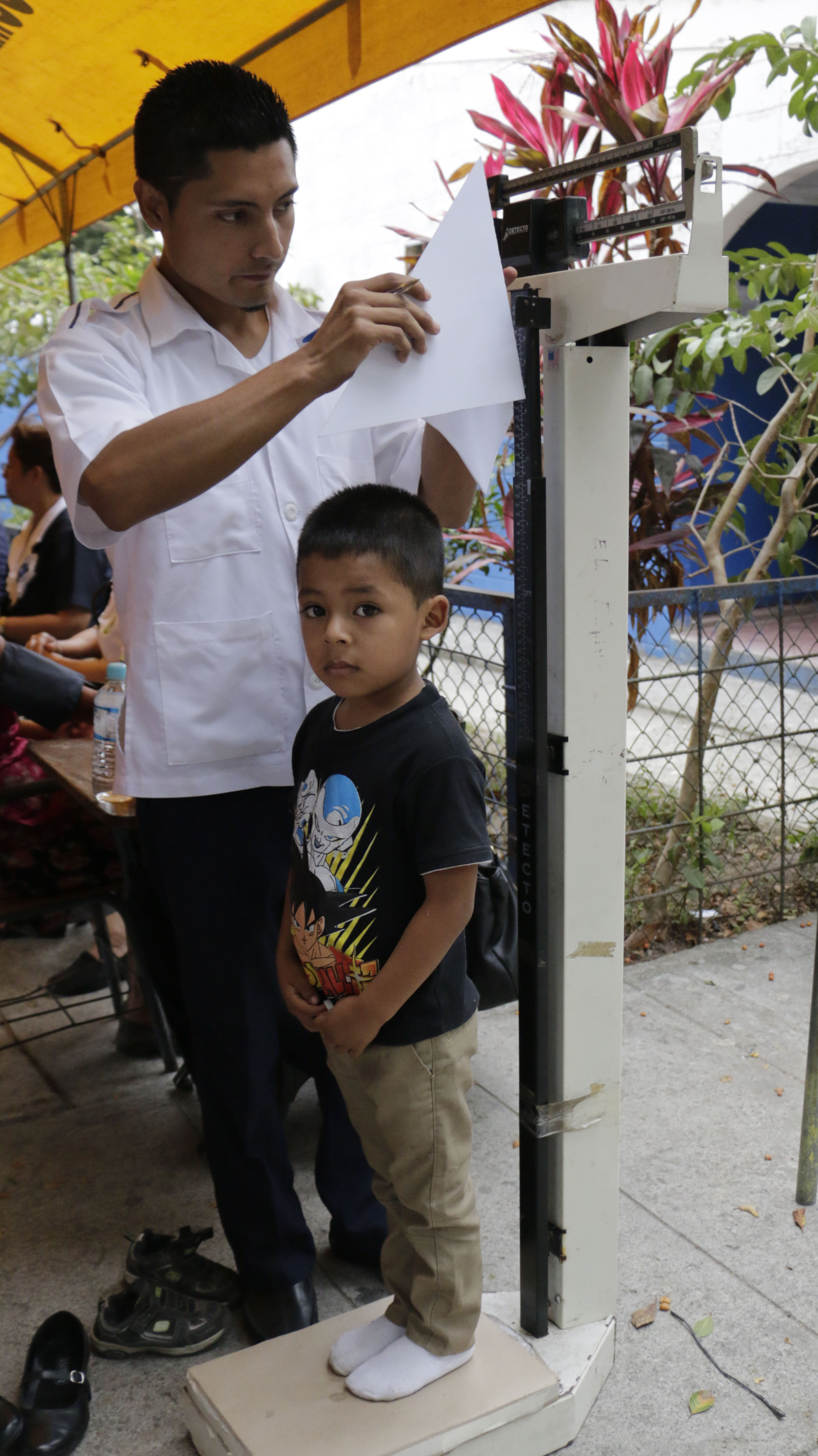
Salvadoran boy in San Pedro Perulapán

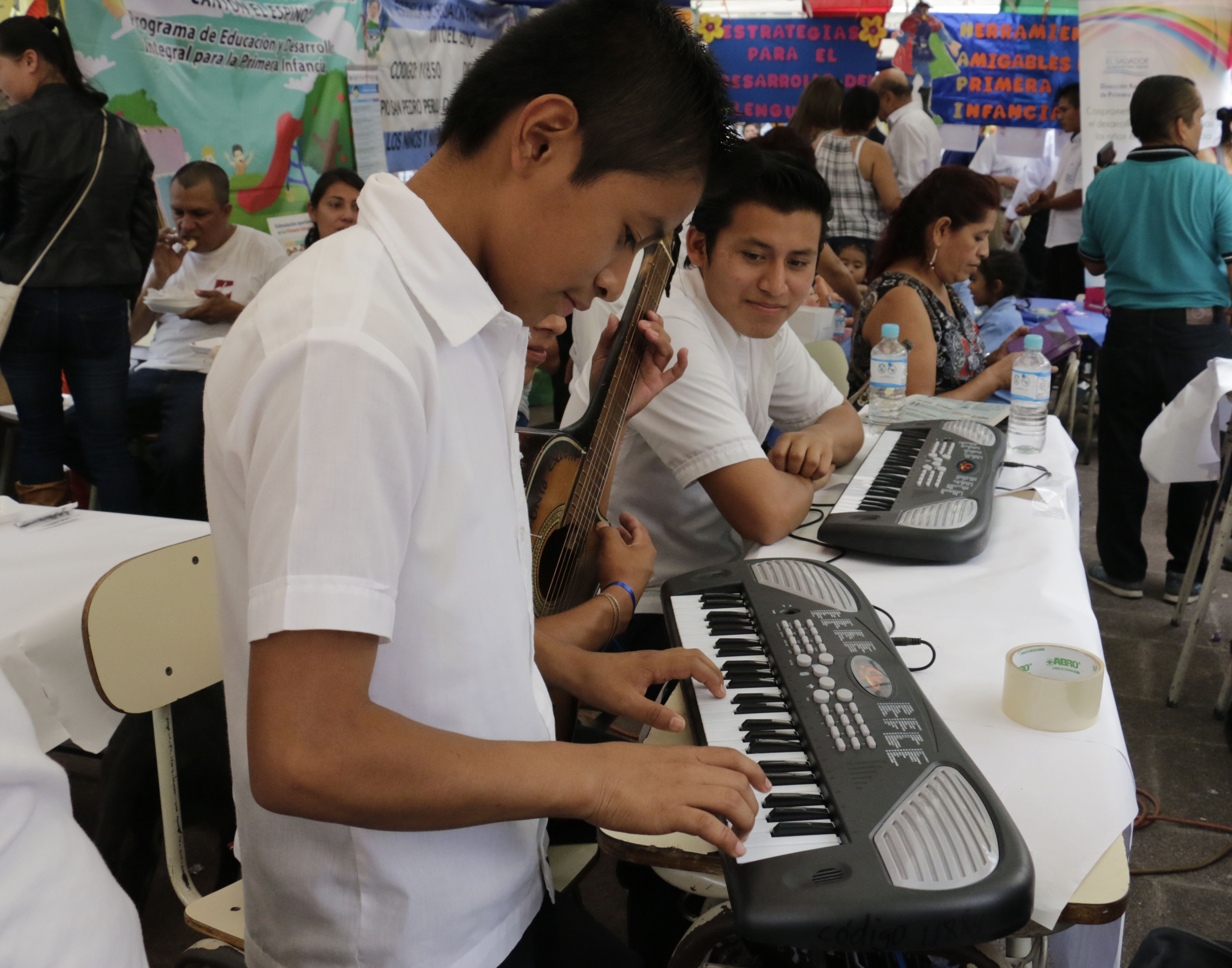
Salvadoran boys in San Pedro Perulapán

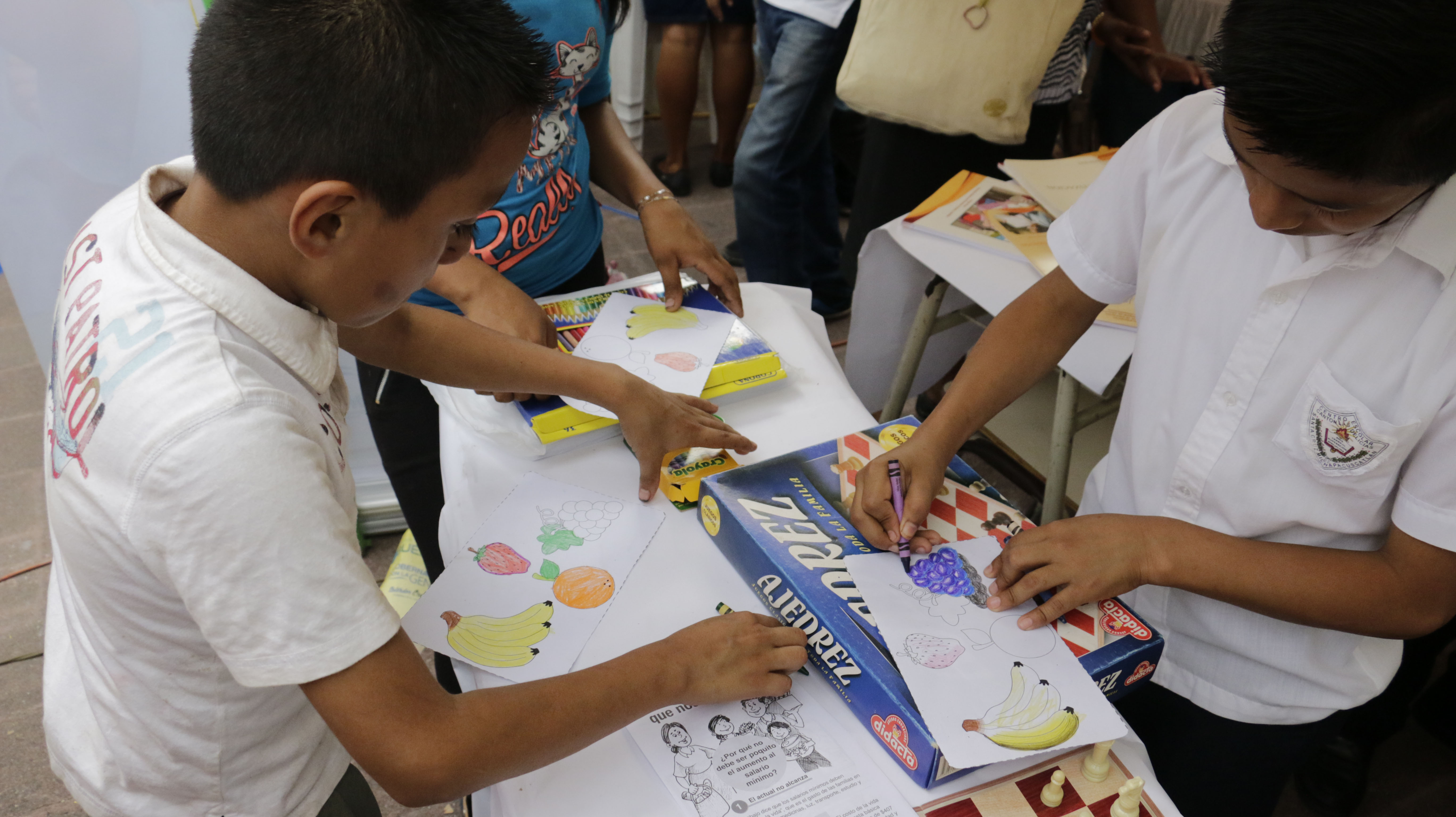
Salvadoran boys coloring, San Pedro Perulapán

El Salvador has the largest population density in Latin America, and is the third most populated country in Central America after Honduras and Guatemala, from the 2005 census, the population exceeds 6 million. The total impact of civil wars, dictatorships and socioeconomics drove over a million Salvadorans (both as immigrants and refugees) into the United States; Guatemala is the second country that hosts more Salvadorans behind the United States, approximately 110,000 Salvadorans according to the national census of 2010. in addition small Salvadoran communities sprung up in Canada, Australia, Belize, Panama, Costa Rica, Italy, and Sweden since the migration trend began in the early 1970s.

=== Salvadoran Diaspora in the United States ===
The 2010 U.S. Census counted 1,648,968 Salvadorans in the United States, up from 655,165 in 2000. By 2017, the figure had risen to over 2.3 million. According to the U.S. Census Bureau's 2015 American Community Survey, the top Metropolitan statistical areas for the Salvadoran community are:

Rank	Metropolitan statistical area	Salvadorans - Estimated
1	Los Angeles-Long Beach-Anaheim, CA MSA	447,788
2	Washington-Arlington-Alexandria, DC-VA-MD-WV MSA	288,262
3	New York-Newark-Jersey City, NY-NJ-PA MSA	236,892
4	Houston-The Woodlands-Sugar Land, TX MSA	169,935
5	San Francisco-Oakland-Berkeley, CA MSA	85,589
6	Dallas-Fort Worth-Arlington, TX MSA	75,536
7	Riverside-San Bernardino-Ontario, CA MSA	54,617
8	Boston-Cambridge-Newton, MA-NH MSA	44,995
9	Miami-Fort Lauderdale-West Palm Beach, FL MSA	38,026
10	Las Vegas-Henderson-Paradise, NV MSA	32,070
11	Atlanta-Sandy Springs-Alpharetta, GA MSA	27,888
12	Baltimore-Columbia-Towson, MD MSA	23,464
13	Charlotte-Concord-Gastonia, NC-SC MSA	18,822
14	San Jose-Sunnyvale-Santa Clara, CA MSA	15,314
15	Chicago-Naperville-Elgin, IL-IN-WI MSA	13,920

Salvadoran-American diaspora over time:

	Total population (x 1000)	Proportion aged 0–14 (%)	Proportion aged 15–64 (%)	Proportion aged 65+ (%)
1950	2 200	42.7	53.3	4.0
1955	2 433	43.6	52.6	3.8
1960	2 773	45.1	51.1	3.7
1965	3 244	46.3	50.1	3.7
1970	3 736	46.4	49.9	3.6
1975	4 232	45.8	50.5	3.7
1980	4 661	45.2	50.9	3.9
1985	5 004	44.1	51.8	4.2
1990	5 344	41.7	53.7	4.6
1995	5 748	39.6	55.5	4.9
2000	5 959	38.3	56.2	5.5
2005	6 073	35.7	58.1	6.2
2010	6 218	32.1	61.0	6.9

== Ethnic groups ==
=== White and Mestizo Salvadorans ===
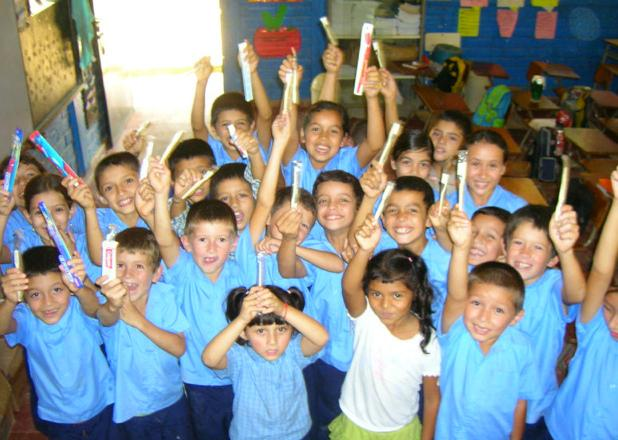
Salvadoran children from Metapán

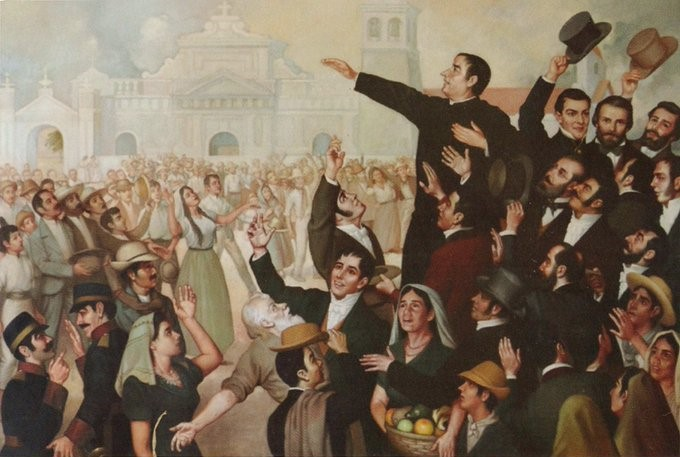
Painting of the First Independence Movement celebration in San Salvador, El Salvador

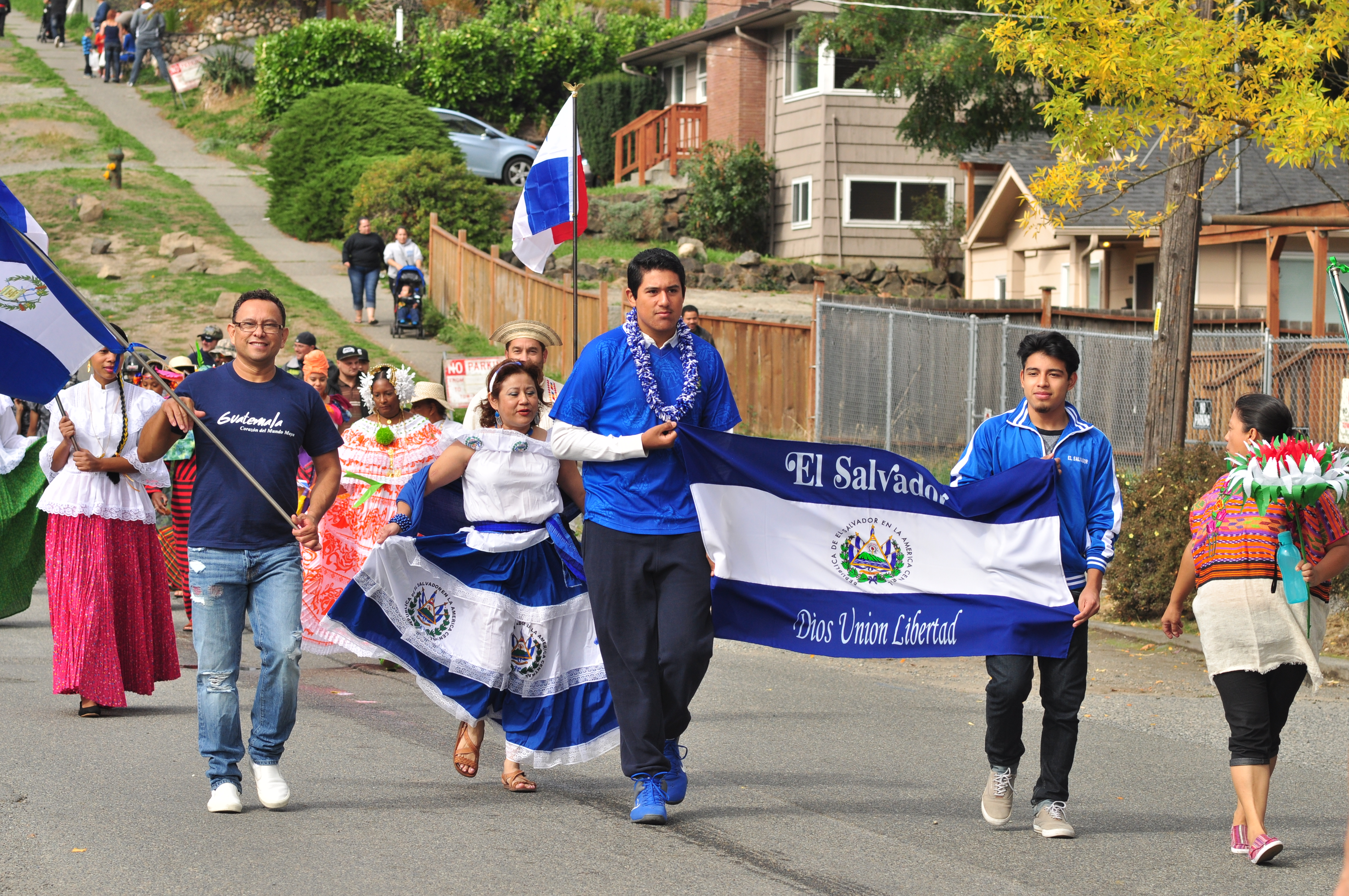
Salvadorans celebrating independence day parade.

As is the case elsewhere in Latin America, there is no clear distinction between White and Mestizo Salvadorans, the large majority of the population have varying proportions of Spanish and Native American ancestry. In addition, many Salvadorans have more recent ancestry from French, German, Swiss, English, Irish, and Italian descent. A majority of Central European settlers in El Salvador arrived during World War II as refugees from the Czech Republic, Germany, Hungary, Poland, and Switzerland. In northern departments like the Chalatenango Department, it is well known that residents in the area are of pure Spanish descent. The governor of San Salvador, Francisco Luis Héctor de Carondelet, ordered families from northern Spain (Galicia and Asturias) to settle the area to compensate for the lack of indigenous people to work the land; it is not uncommon to see people with blond hair, fair skin, and blue or green eyes in municipalities like Dulce Nombre de María, La Palma, and El Pital. However, the majority of Salvadorans of full Spanish descent possess Mediterranean racial features: olive skin and dark hair and eyes (black or dark brown) and identify with the mestizo majority, As for the mestizo / castizo population, it dates back to the time of the discovery of America, Because there were no Spanish women, the Spaniards maintained relationships with Amerindian women, before the discovery, El Salvador was the second Central American country with the least indigenous population, and due to the hostility of the Spanish and added to the diseases brought by them, the population was greatly reduced and precipitously, the Amerindian men were more affected than the Amerindian women, in the first years of the colony, 50% of the population Salvadoran was Mestizo and White, in 1805, 78% of the inhabitants of El Salvador were Mestizo and White.

Later, in the post-colonial era, the country received several groups of European immigrants, mainly from Spain and Italy, mainly between 1880 and 1930, when several Europeans emigrated to the country, immigration had a great demographic impact, the population of El Salvador went from 480 thousand to 1.2 million inhabitants

==== Arab Salvadorans ====
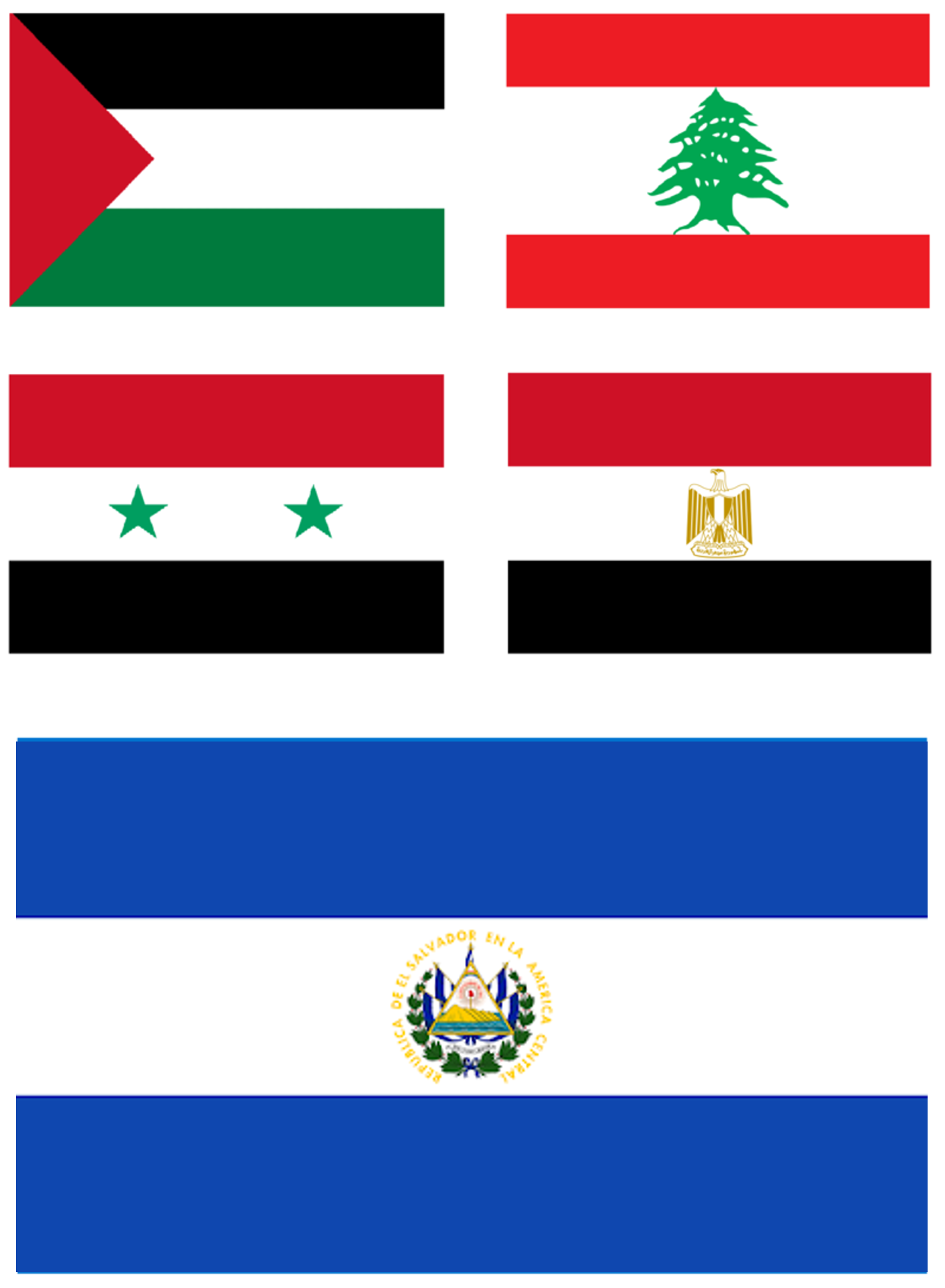
Arab Salvadorans include Palestinian Salvadoran, Lebanese Salvadoran, Syrian Salvadoran and Egyptian Salvadoran.

There is a significant with at least partial Arab descent (of about 200,000); mostly from Palestine (especially from the area of Bethlehem), but also from Lebanon. Salvadorans of Palestinian descent numbered around 150,000 individuals, while Salvadorans of Lebanese descent is around 30,000. There is also a small community of Jews who came to El Salvador from France, Germany, Morocco, Tunisia, and Turkey.

Arab immigration in El Salvador began at the end of the 19th century in the wake of the repressive policies applied by the Ottoman Empire against Maronite Catholics. Several of the destinations that the Lebanese chose at that time were in countries of the Americas, including El Salvador. This resulted in the Arab diaspora residents being characterized by forging in devoutly Christian families and very attached to their beliefs, because in these countries they can exercise their faith without fear of persecution, which resulted in the rise of Lebanese-Salvadoran, Syrian-Salvadoran and Palestinian-Salvadoran communities in El Salvador.

Currently, the Palestinian community forms the largest Arab diaspora population in El Salvador, with 150,000 direct descendants, followed by the Lebanese community with more than 30,000 direct descendants. Both are almost entirely composed of Catholic and Orthodox Christians.

Inter-ethnic marriage in the Lebanese community with Salvadorans, regardless of religious affiliation, is very high; most have only one father with Lebanese nationality and mother of Salvadoran nationality. As a result, some of them speak Arabic fluently. But most, especially among younger generations, speak Spanish as a first language and Arabic as a second.

Arab-Salvadoreans and their descendants have traditionally played an outsized role in El Salvador's economic and political life, with many becoming business leaders and noteworthy political figures.

=== Indigenous Salvadorans ===
Map of El Salvador's Indigenous Peoples at the time of the Spanish conquest: 1. Pipil people, 2. Lenca people, 3. Kakawira o Cacaopera, 4. Xinca, 5. Maya Ch'orti' people, 6. Maya Poqomam people, 7. Mangue o Chorotega.

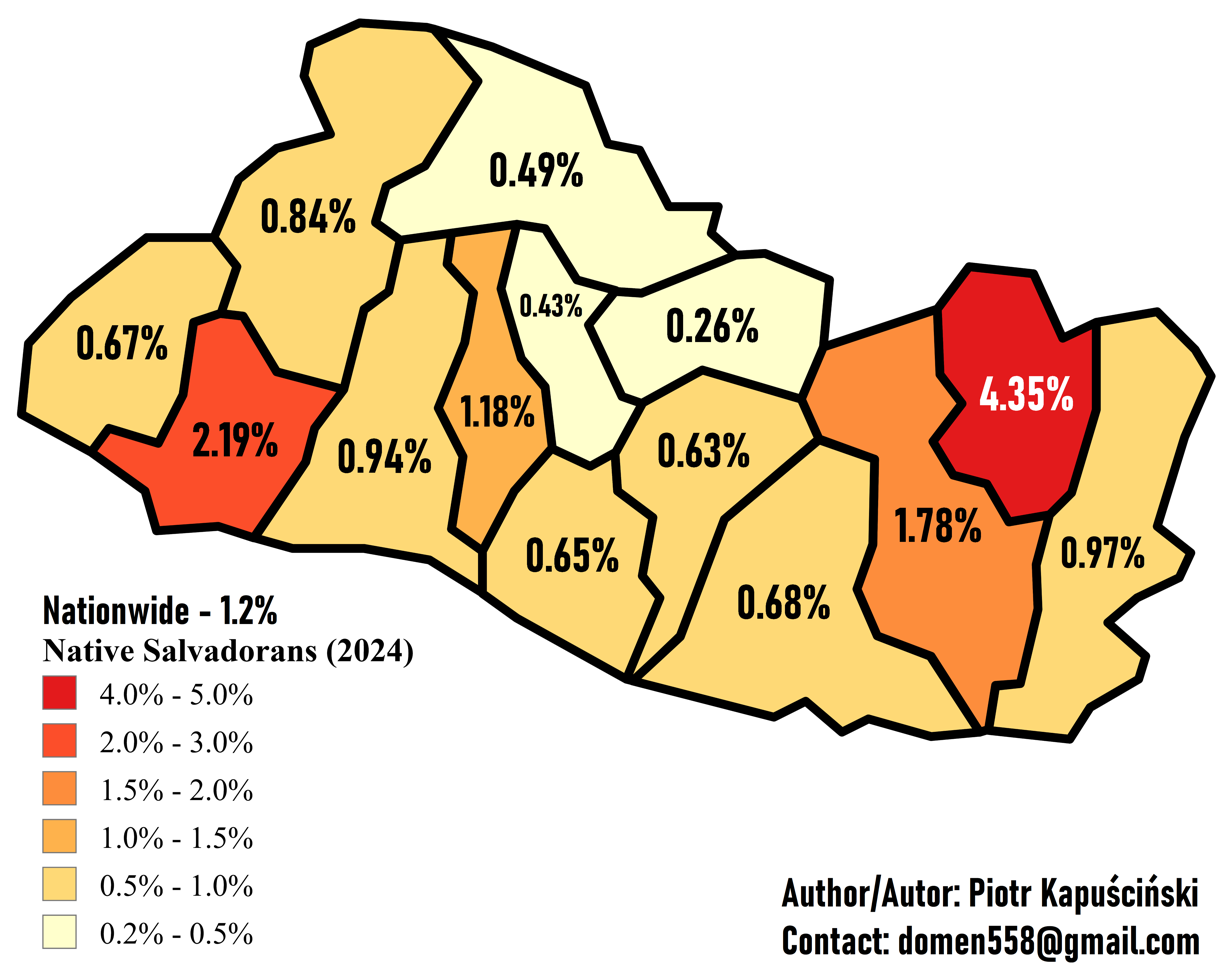
Distribution of Native Salvadorans according to the 2024 census

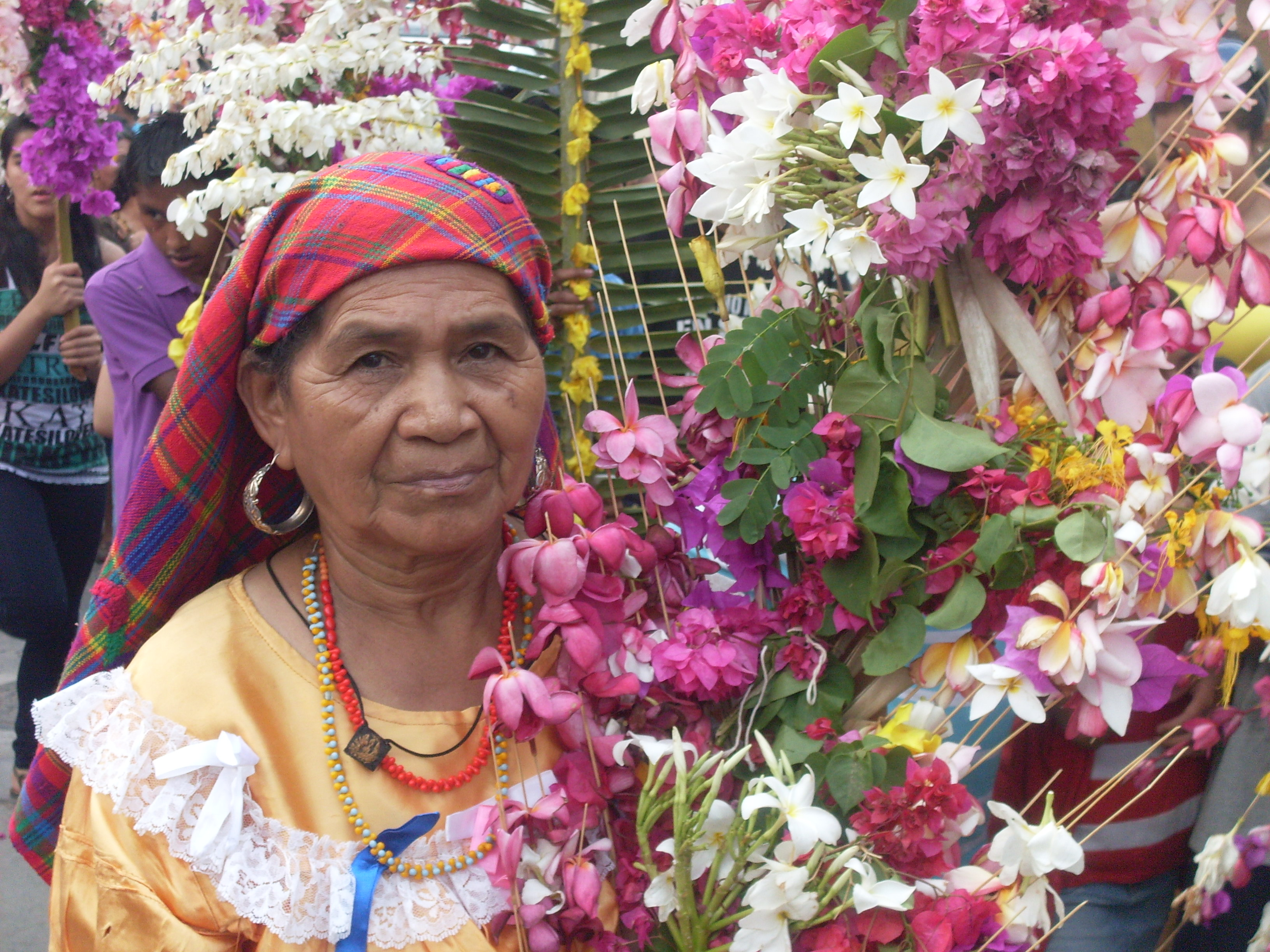
Indigenous Salvadoran woman from Panchimalco

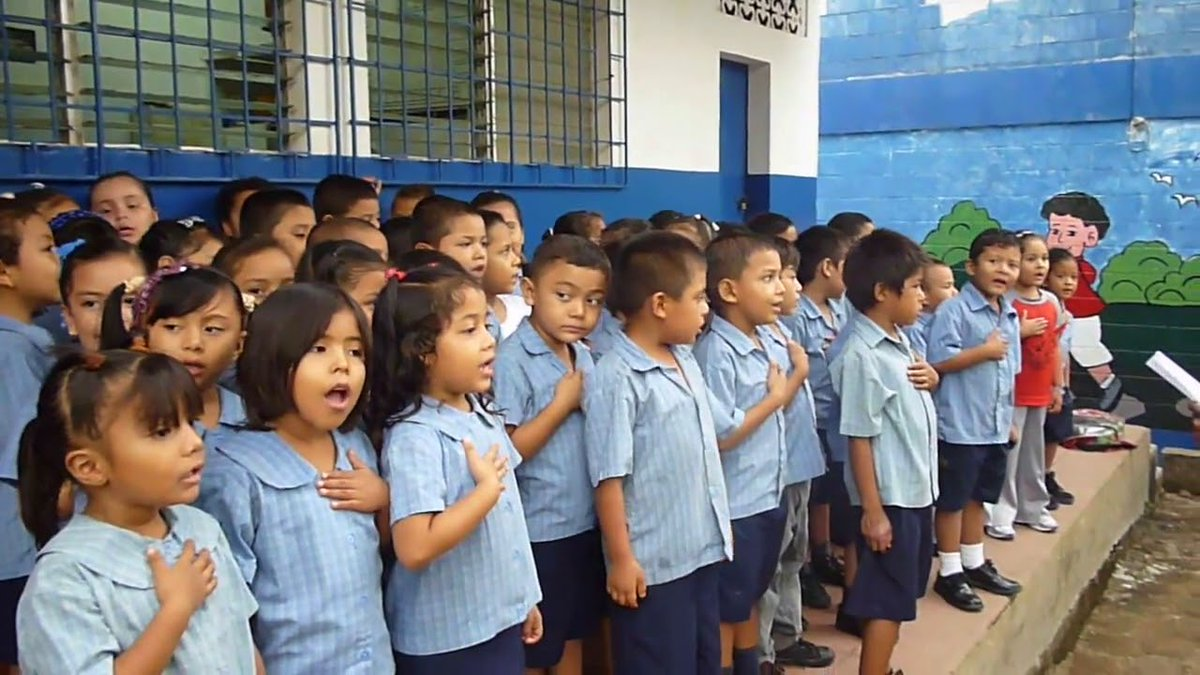
Salvadoran school children singing national anthem

According to the 2024 Salvadoran census, about 1.2% of the population are of full or predominantly indigenous origin. Currently the only native groups of El Salvador are the Pipil people, Lenca people and Cacaopera people; before the Spanish Conquest, the territory also hosted small enclaves of Maya peoples: the Pogomam/Chorti, the Xinca, and the Mengue. The Pipil are located in the west and central part of the country; the Lenca are found east of the Lempa River; and there are small populations of Cacaopera people in the Morazán Department.

The official number of indigenous people in El Salvador has been criticized by indigenous organizations and academics as too small and many accuse the government of denying the existence of indigenous Salvadorans in the country. According to the National Salvadoran Indigenous Coordination Council (CCNIS) and CONCULTURA (National Council for Art and Culture at the Ministry of Education), approximately 70,000 or 1 per cent of Salvadorian peoples are indigenous. Nonetheless, very few Amerindians have retained their customs and traditions, having over time assimilated into the dominant Mestizo/Spanish culture. The low numbers of indigenous people may be partly explained by historically high rates of old-world diseases, absorption into the mestizo population, as well as mass murder during the 1932 Salvadoran peasant uprising (or La Matanza). This massacre saw (estimates of) up to 30,000 peasants killed in a short period of time. Many authors note that since La Matanza the indigenous in El Salvador have been very reluctant to describe themselves as such (in census declarations for example) or to wear indigenous dress or be seen to be taking part in any cultural activities or customs that might be understood as indigenous. Departments and cities in the country with notable indigenous populations include Sonsonate (especially Izalco, Nahuizalco, and Santo Domingo de Guzmán), Cacaopera, and Panchimalco, in the San Salvador Department.

=== Other ===
In the 2007 census, 0.7% of the population was considered as "other". There are up to 100,000 Nicaraguans living in El Salvador.

=== Language ===
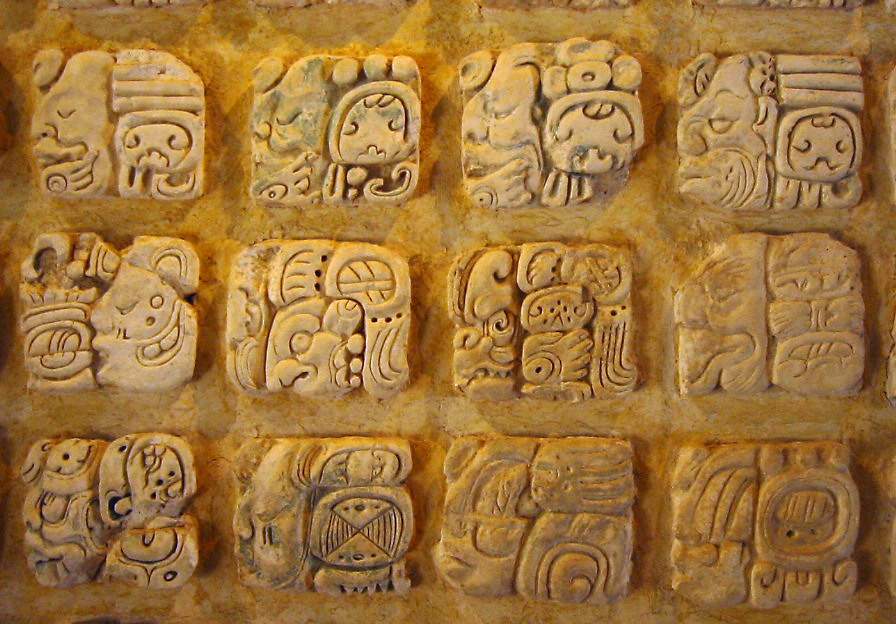
El Salvador was home to Mayan Script

Spanish is the language spoken by virtually all inhabitants. Spanish (official), Salvadoran Sign Language, Pipil (Nawat), Kekchí. Immigrant languages include Chinese, Arabic, Poqomam, and American Sign Language.

==== Literacy ====
definition: age 10 and over can read and write
total: 95.0%
male: 94.4%
female: 95.5%
urban: 97.2%
rural: 91.8%

=== Religion ===
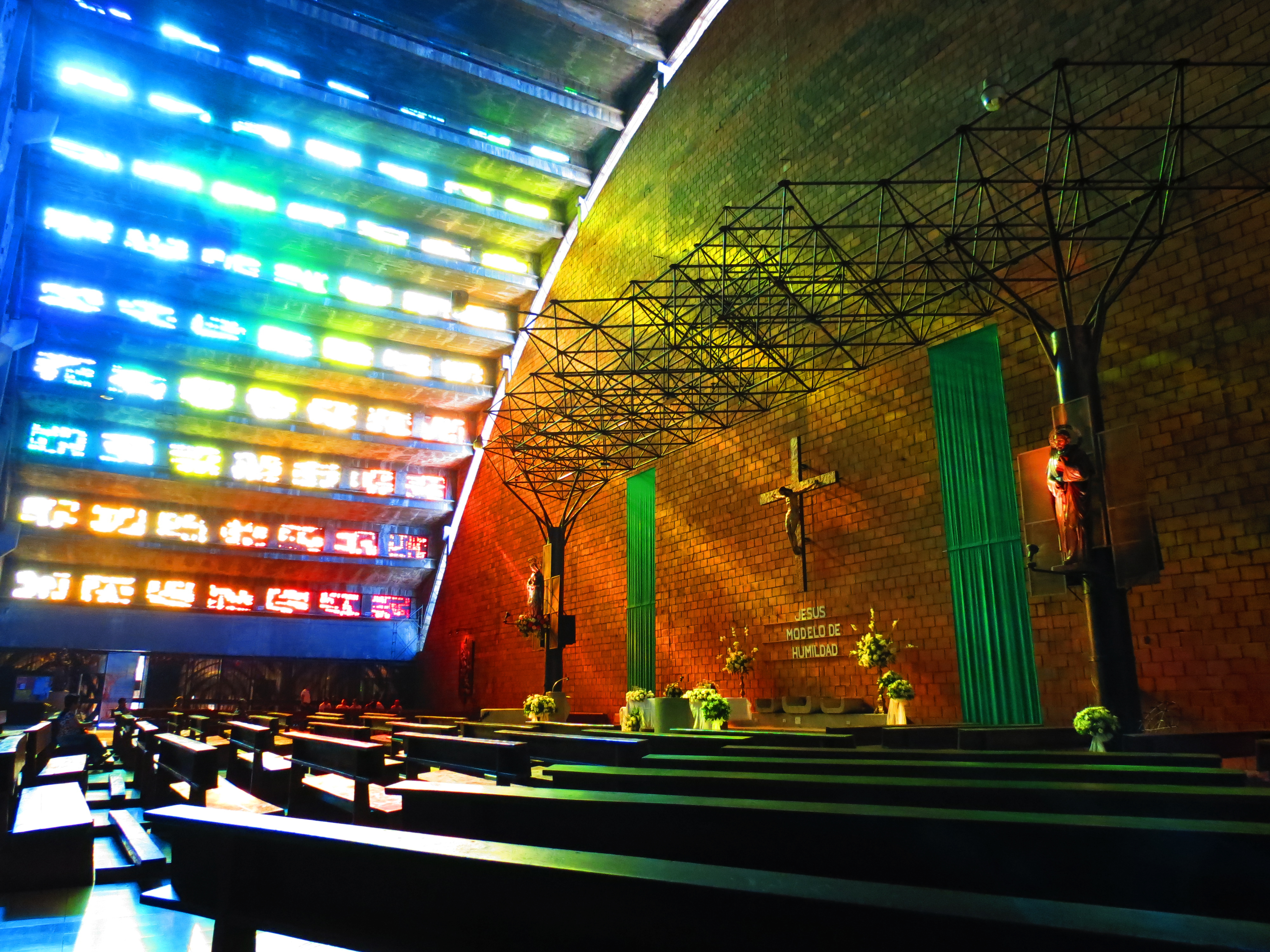
Iglesia El Rosario, San Salvador

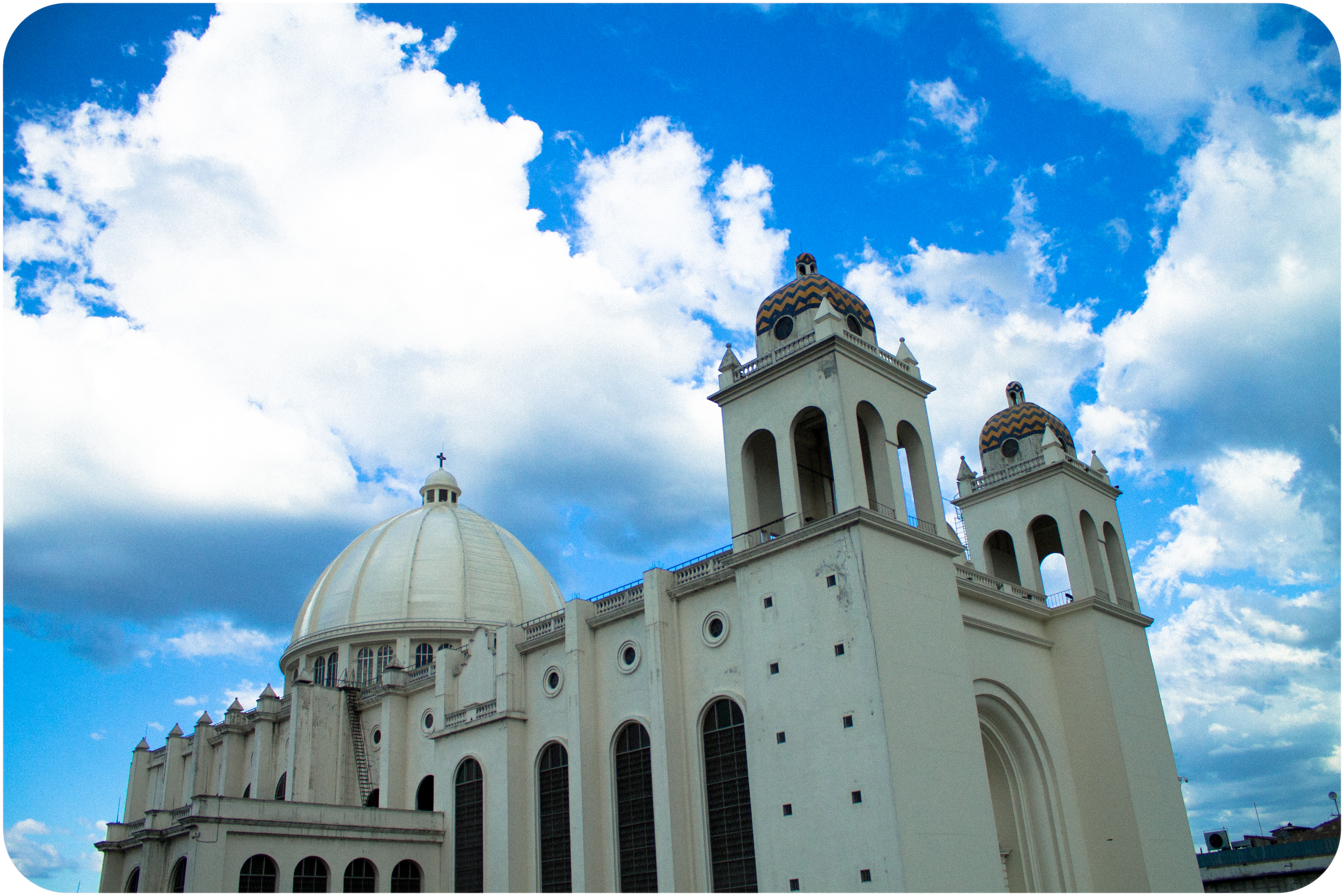
San Salvador Cathedral

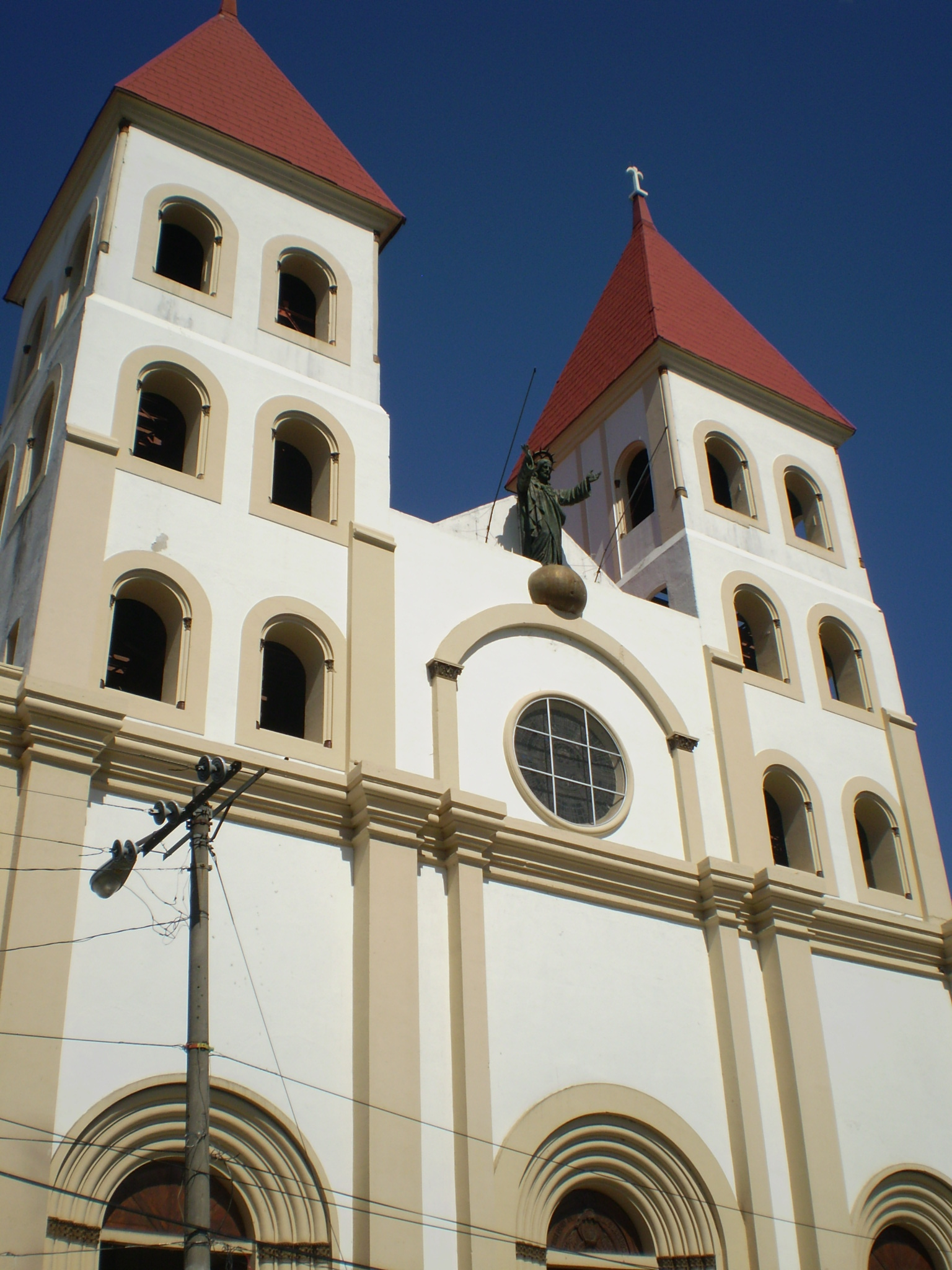
Cathedral Basilica of Queen of Peace

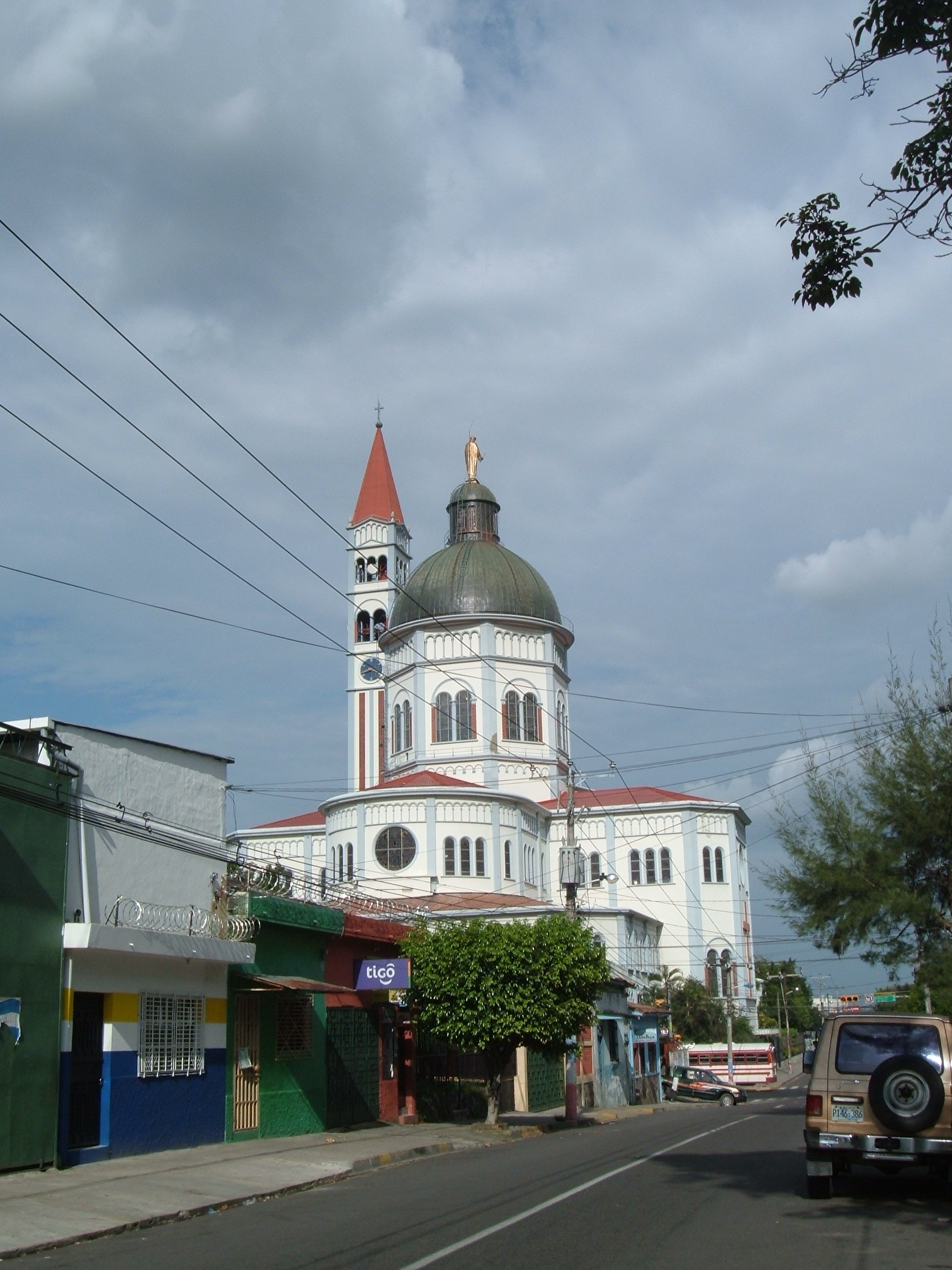
Iglesia Don Rúa, San Salvador

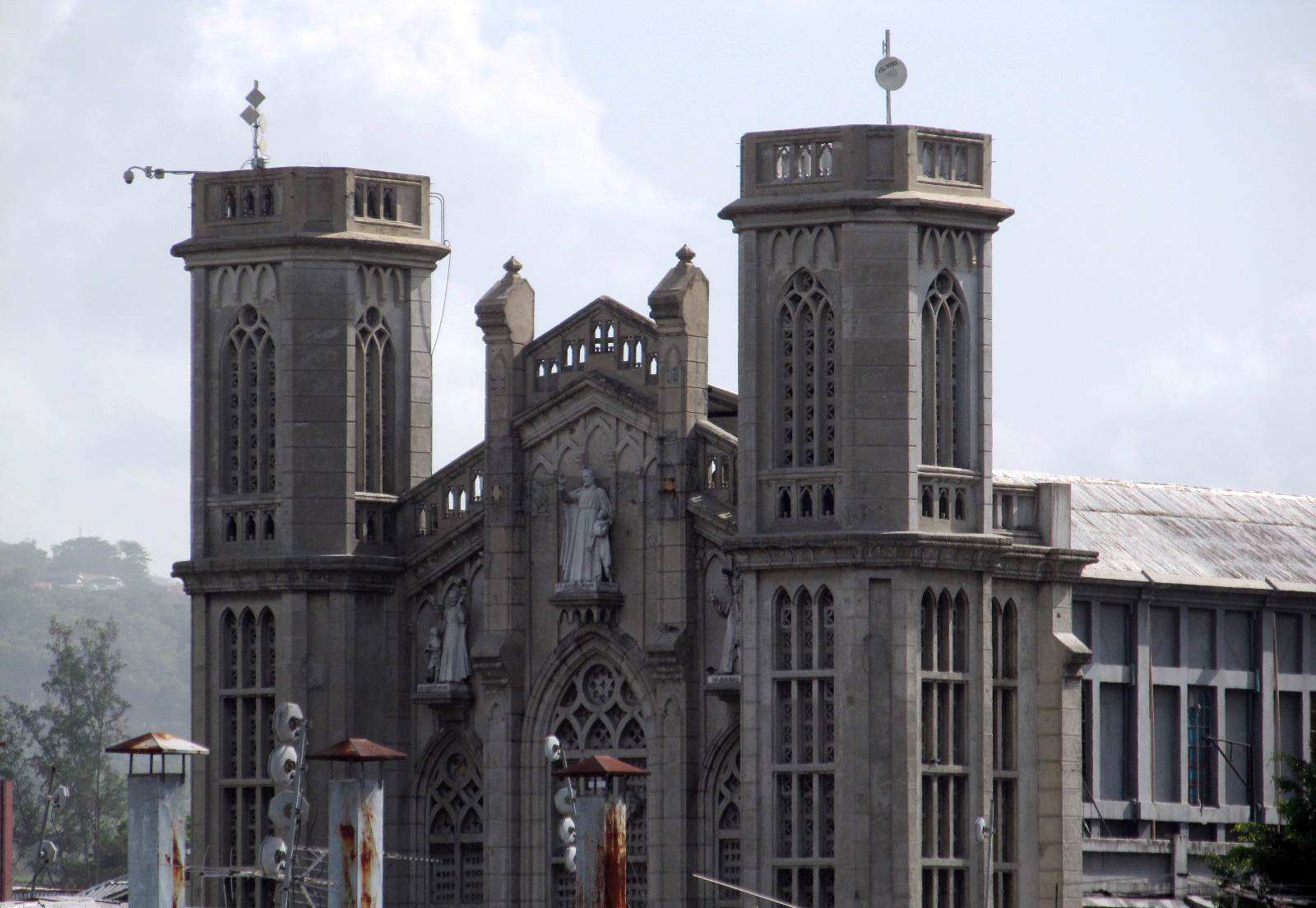
Iglesia El Calvario, San Salvador

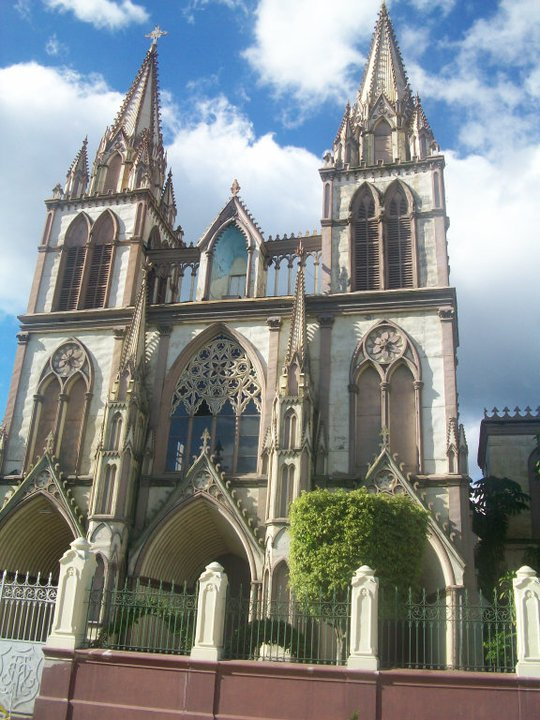
Iglesia El Carmen, Santa Tecla

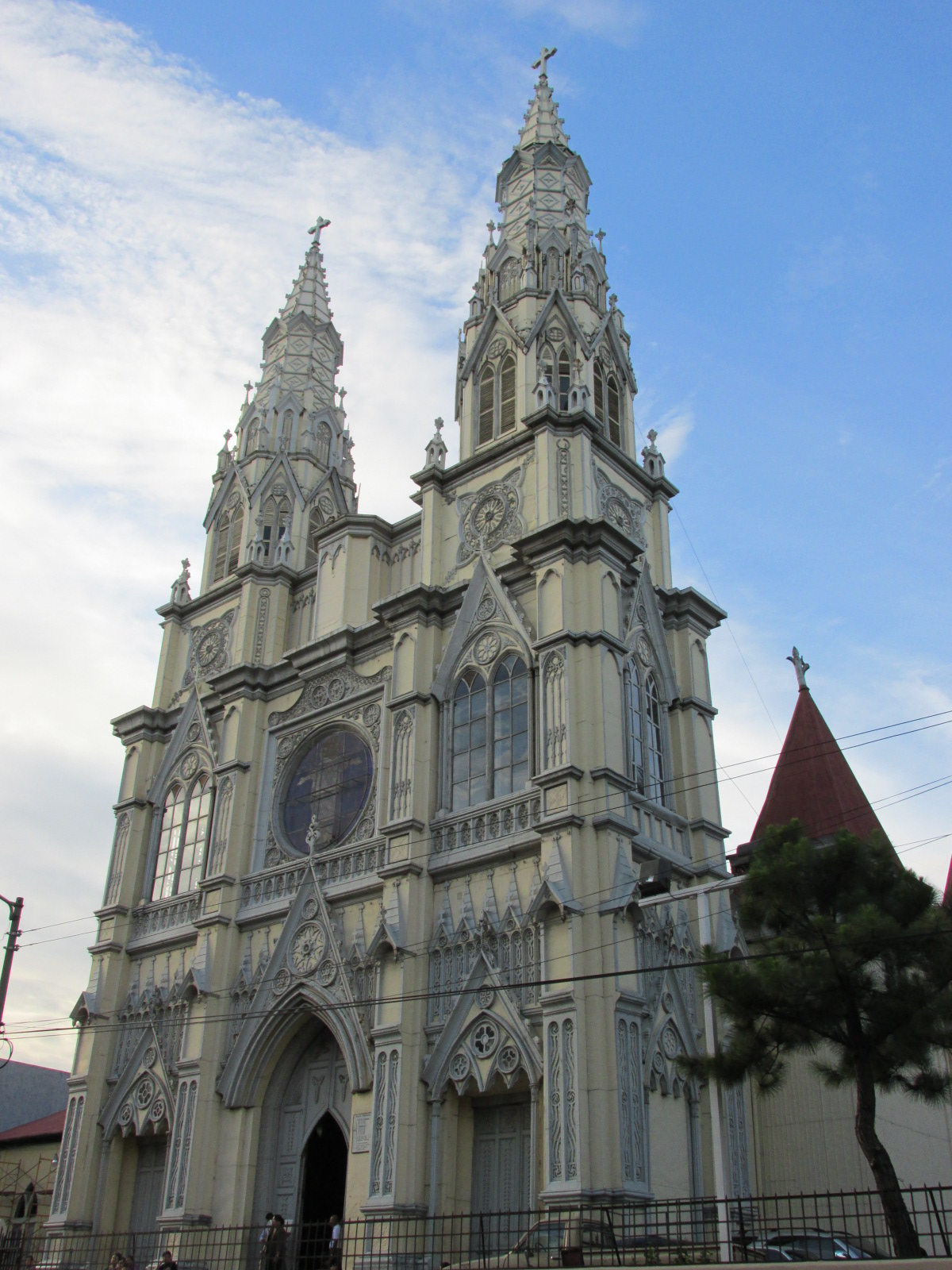
Basílica del Sagrado Corazón de Jesús, San Salvador

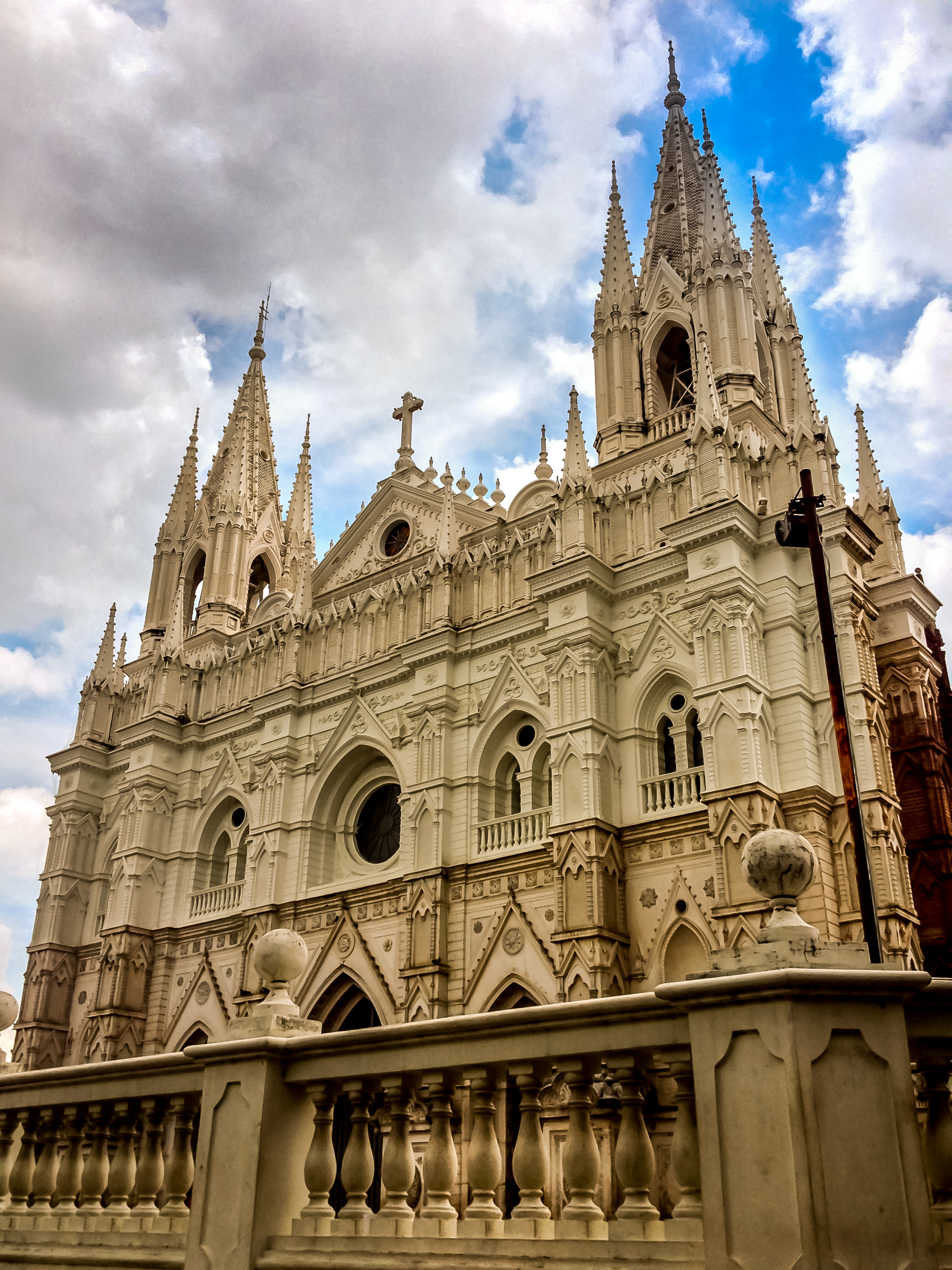
Cathedral of Santa Ana

Religious background in El Salvador
Religion	Percent
Roman Catholic	47%
Protestant–Evangelical	33%
None	17%
Other	3%

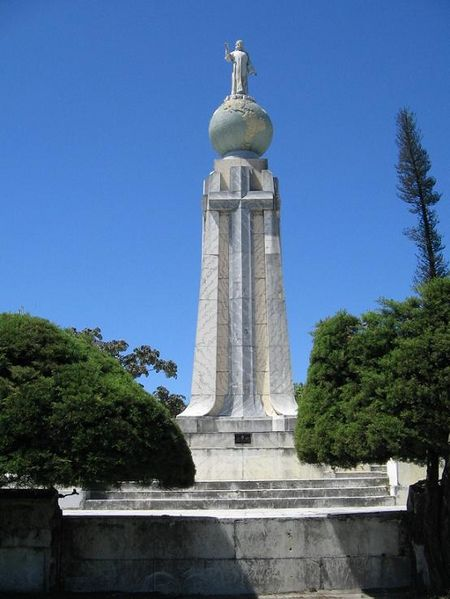
The iconic Jesus statue Monumento al Divino Salvador del Mundo, a landmark located in the country's capital, San Salvador.

There is diversity of religious beliefs in El Salvador. The majority of the population is Christian. Roman Catholics (47%) and Evangelicals (33%) are the two major denominations in the country. Those not affiliated with any religious group amount to 17% of the population. The remainder of the population (3%) is made up of Jehovah's Witnesses, Hare Krishnas, Muslims, Jews, Buddhists, Latter-day Saints, and those adhering to indigenous religious beliefs.

== Culture ==
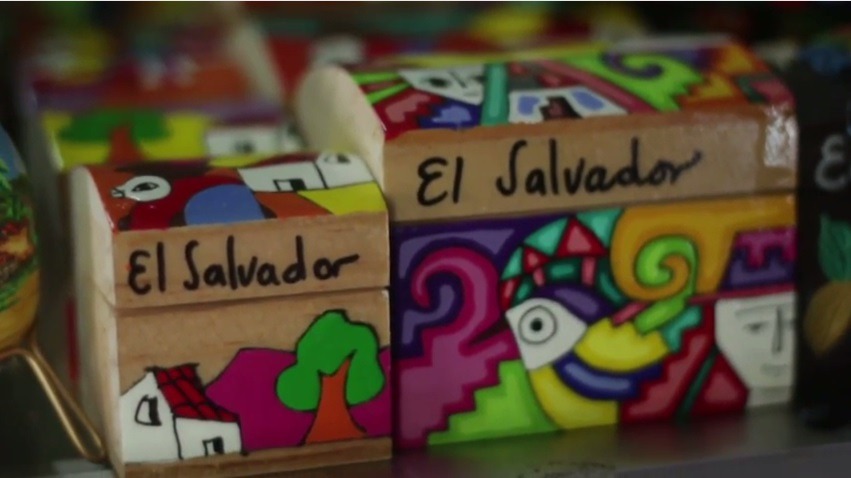
La Palma-type art, from La Palma, El Salvador

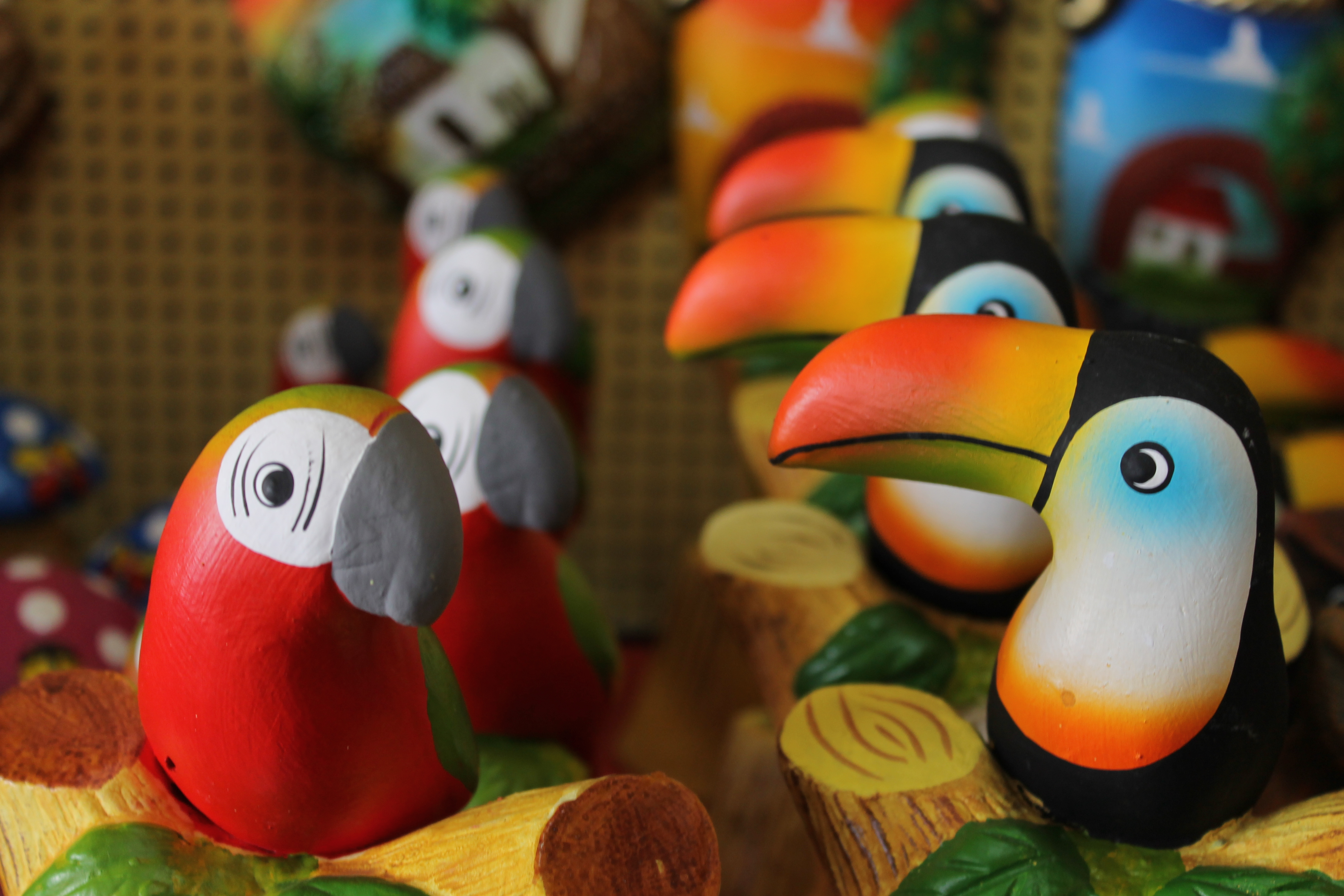
Arts and craft from Ilobasco

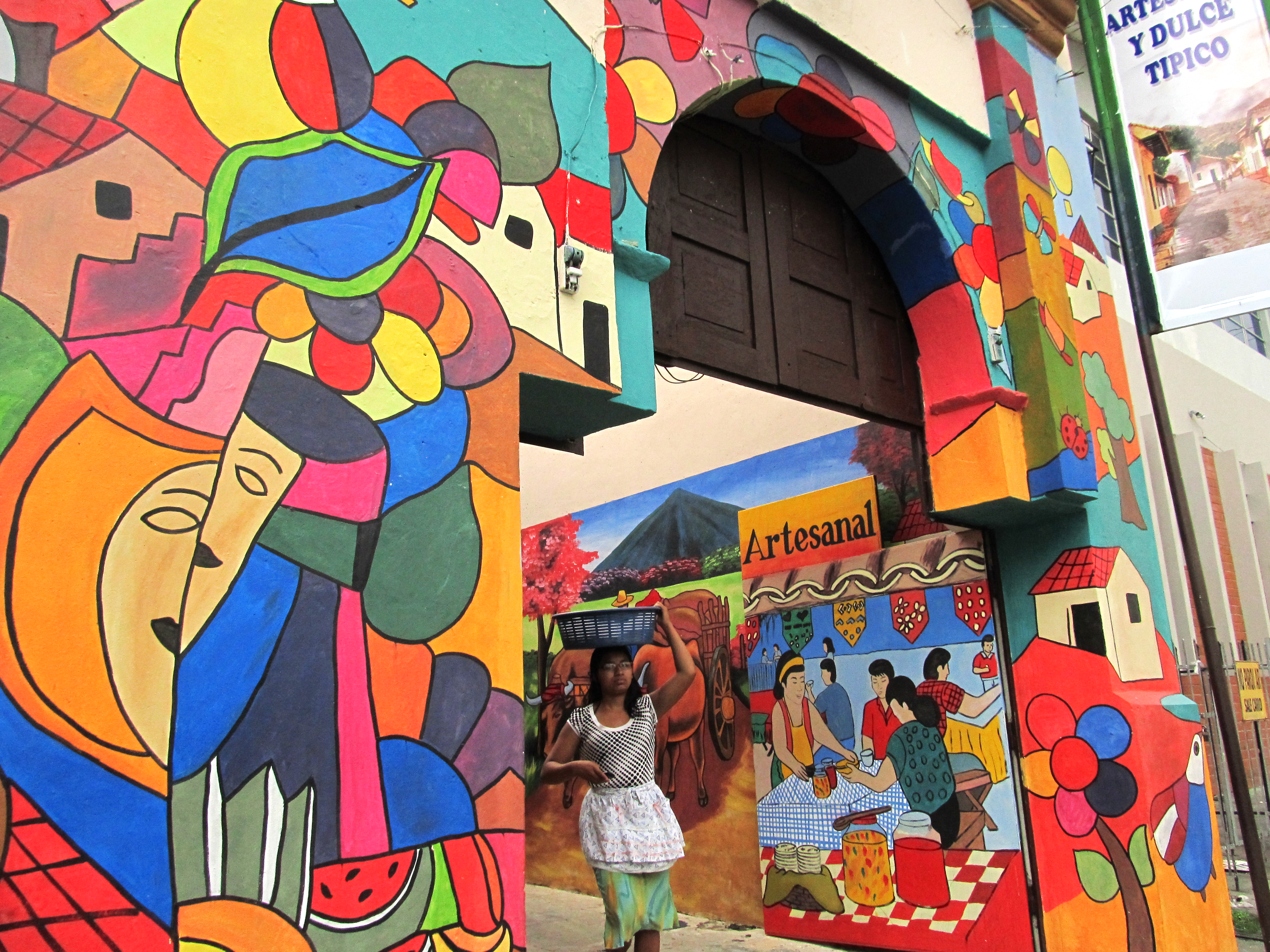
La Palma-type art form from Santa Ana, El Salvador

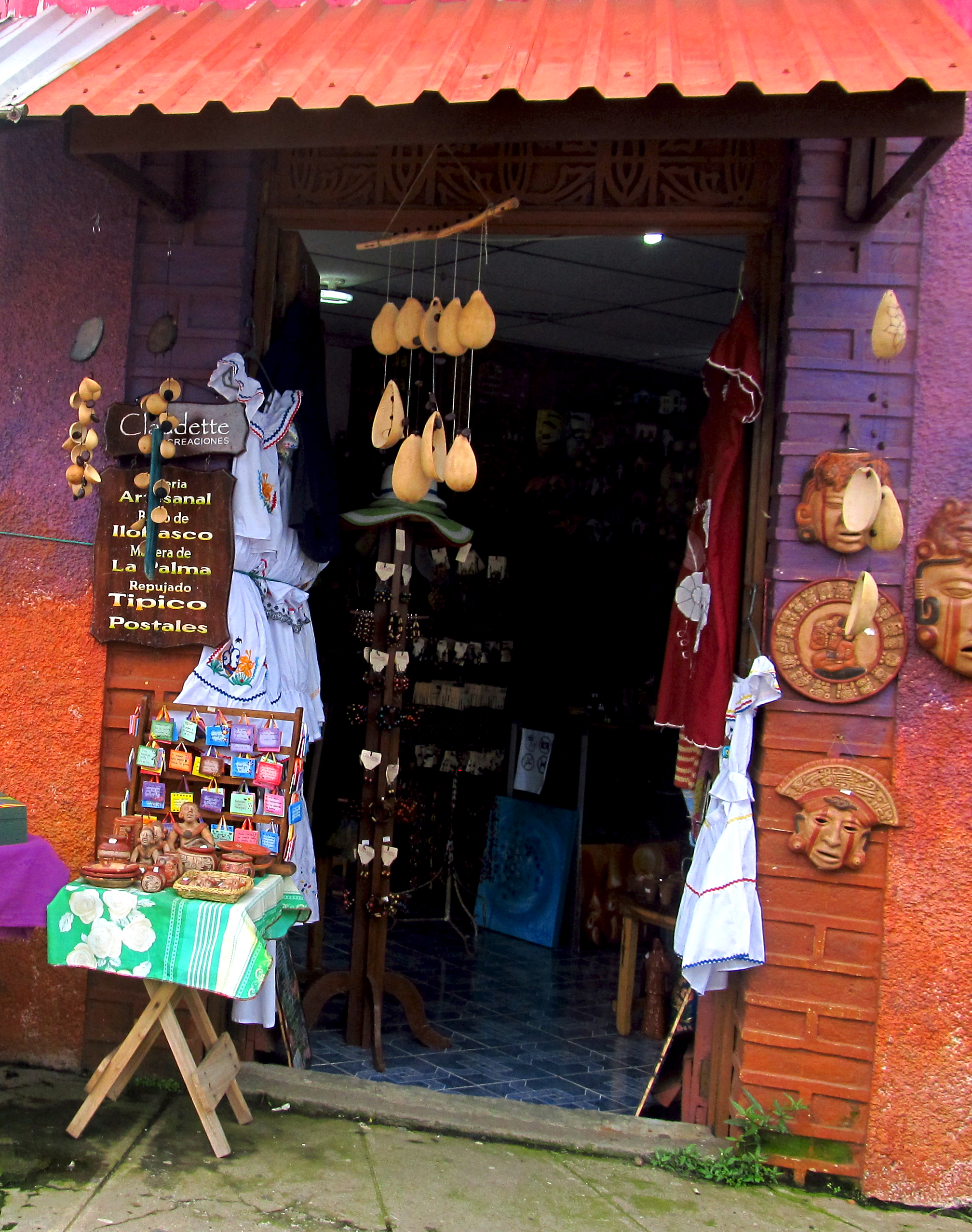
Mesoamerican souvenirs from Juayúa

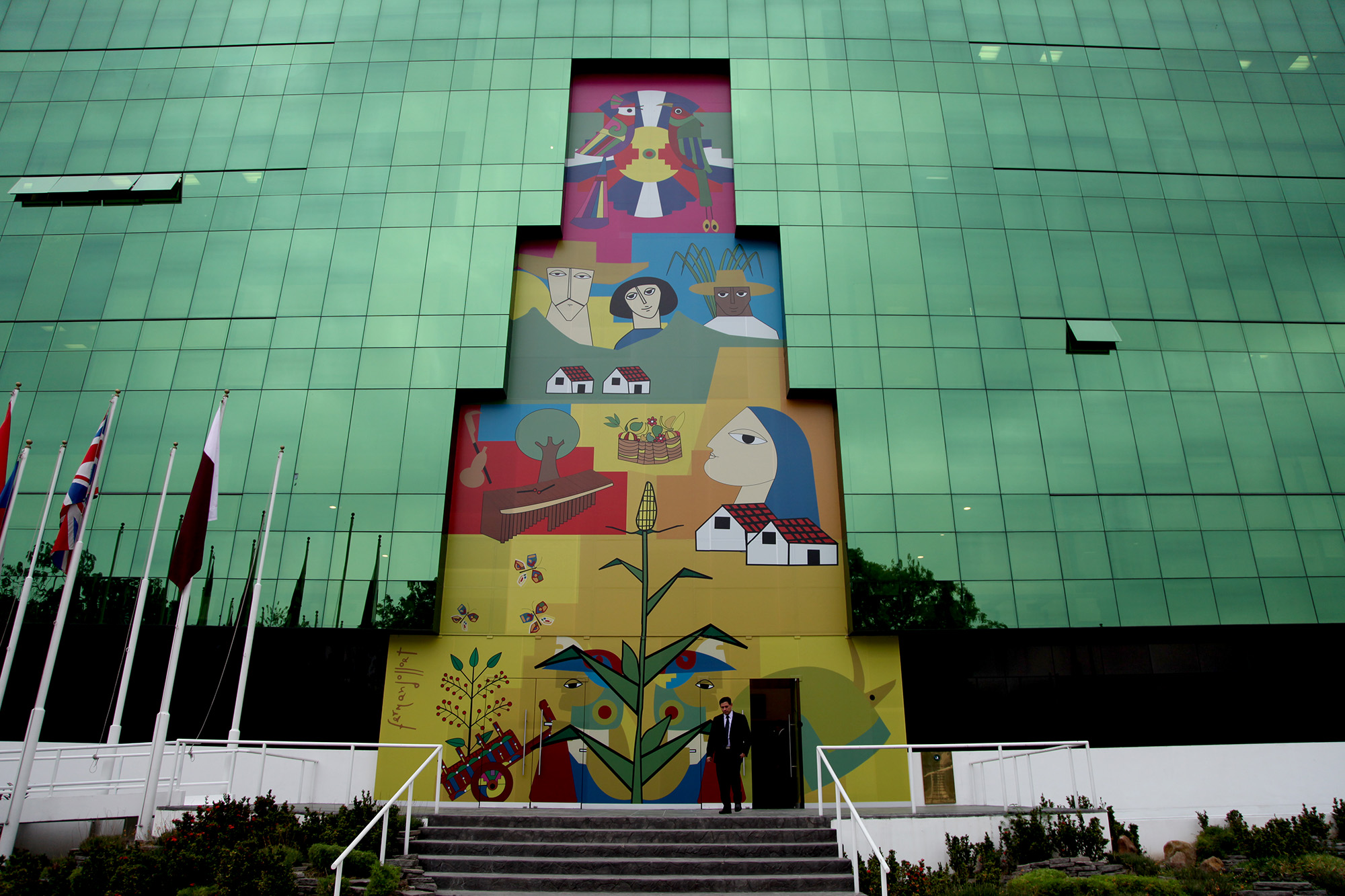
La Palma-Style art on modern Salvadoran building in San Salvador

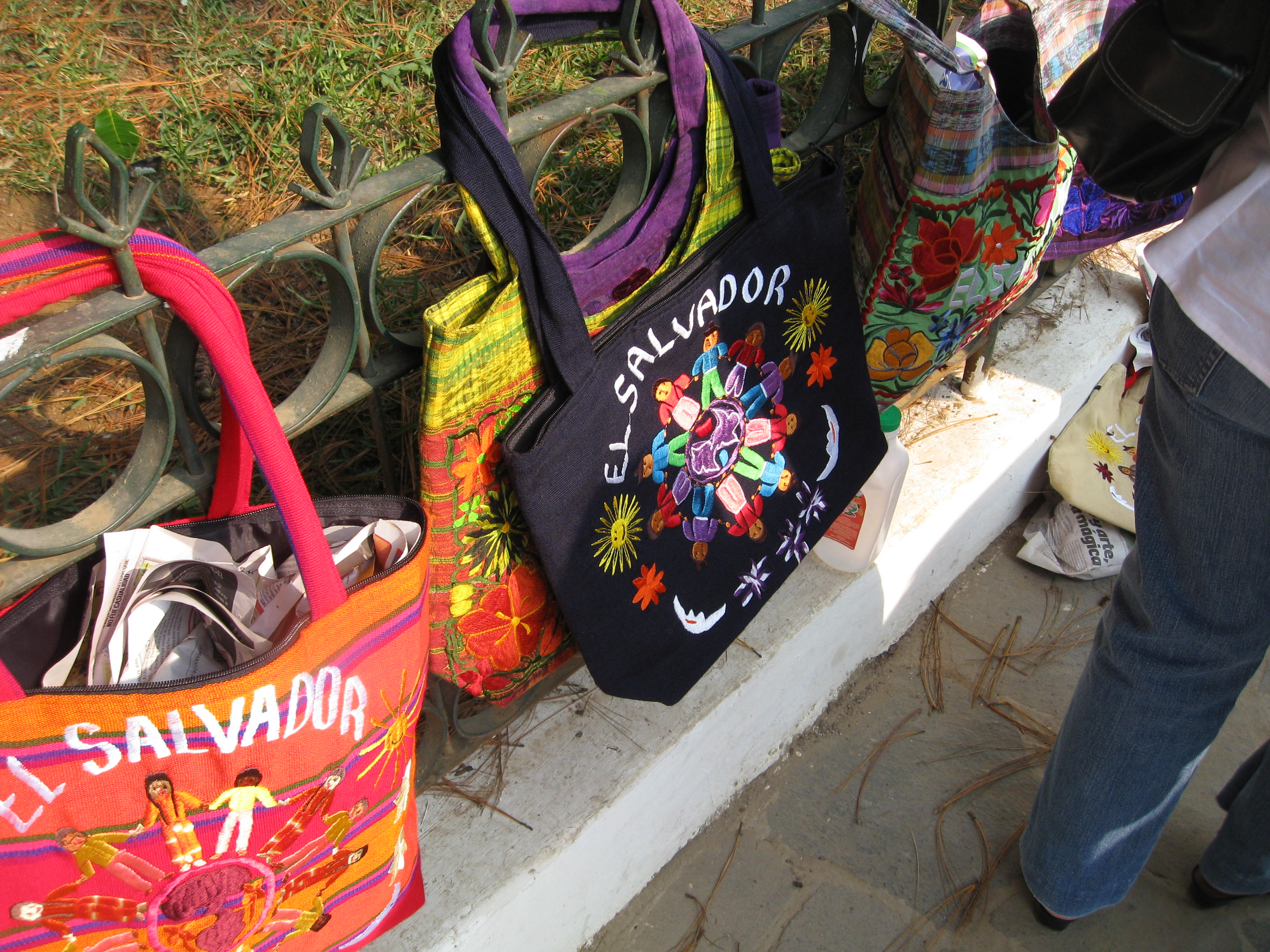
Handcraft bag from Concepción de Ataco

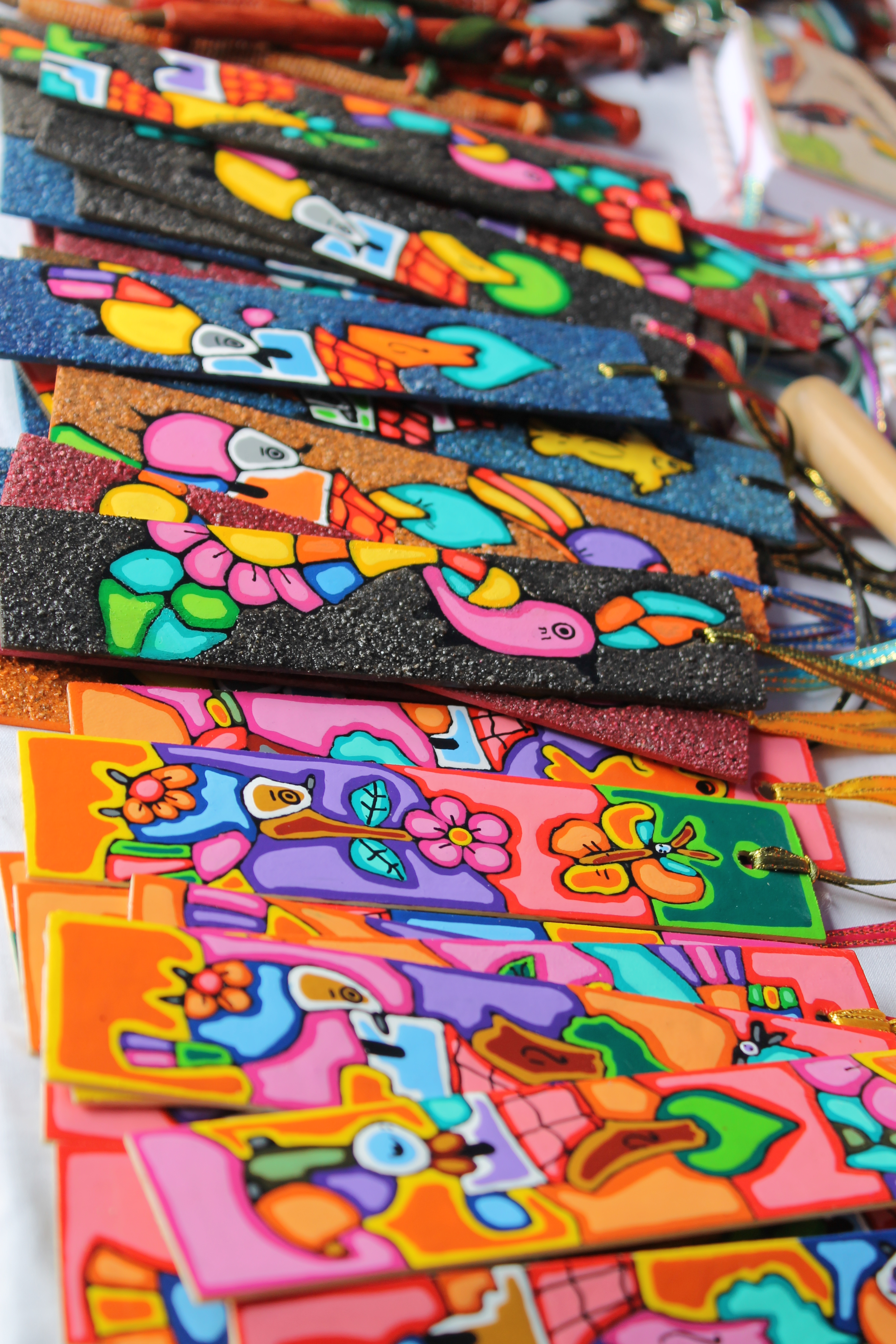
Hand crafted bookmarks from La Palma

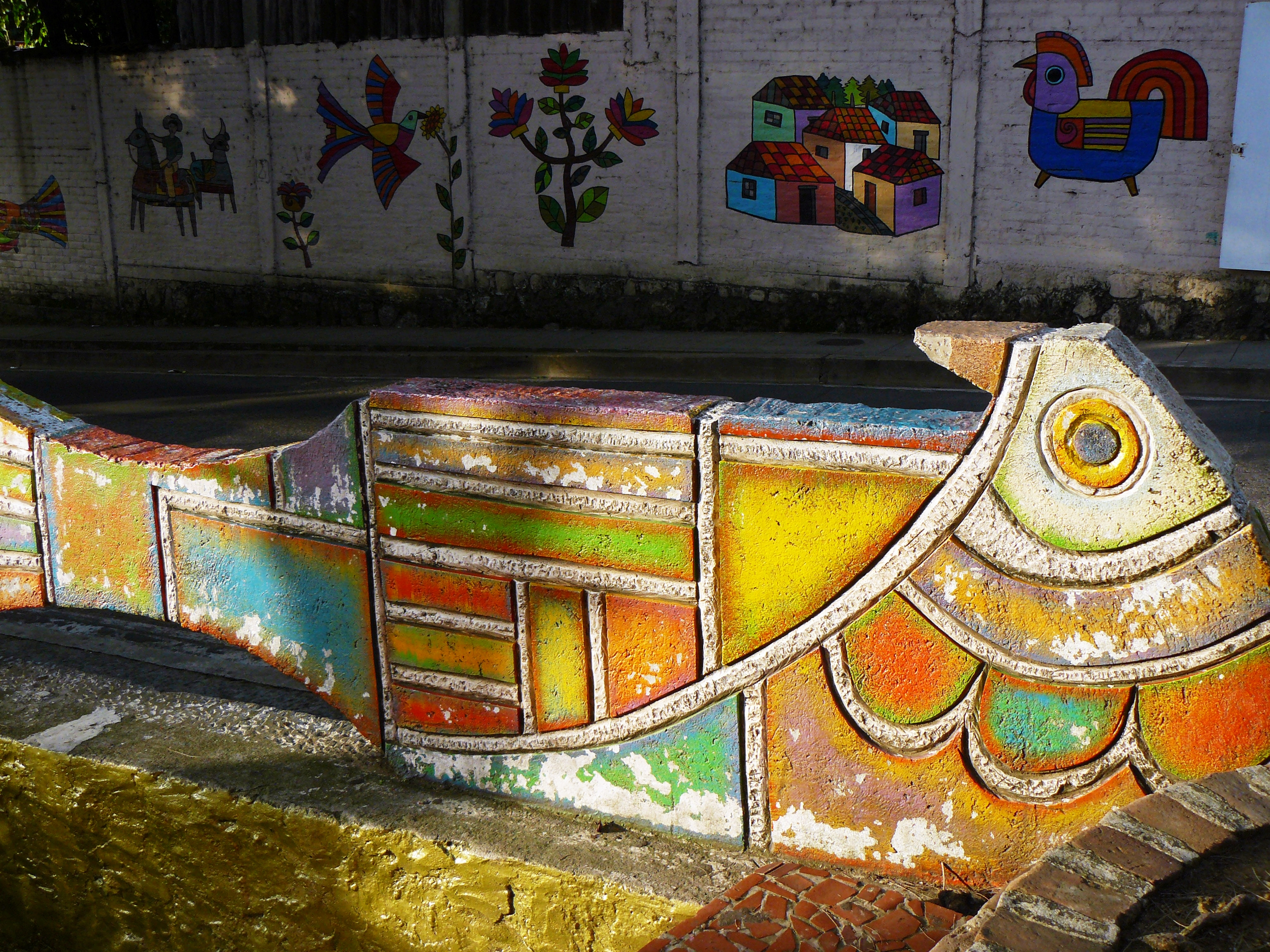
Salvadoran staple art in La Palma

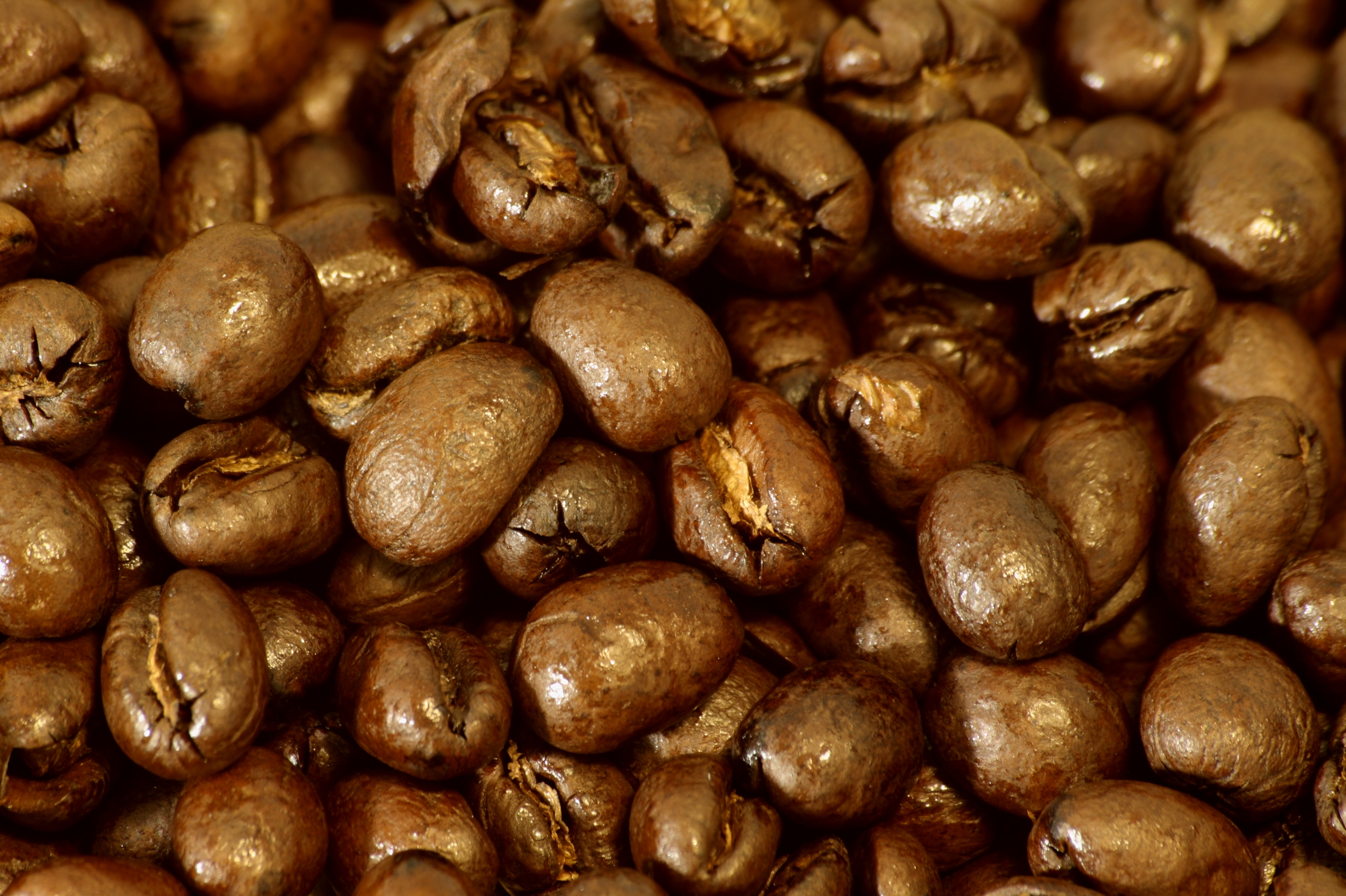
Coffee production in El Salvador

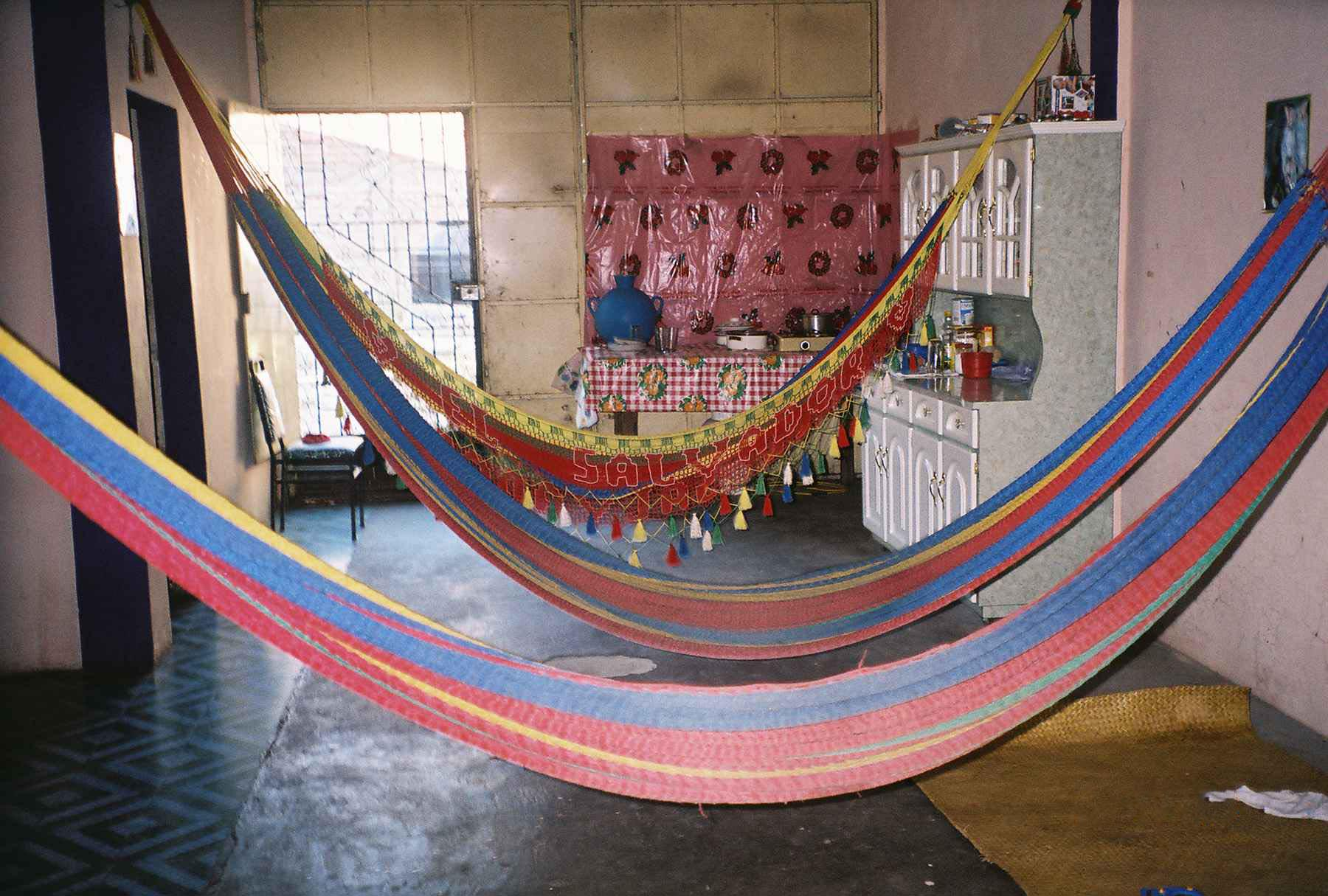
Salvadpran hammocks from Morazán Department

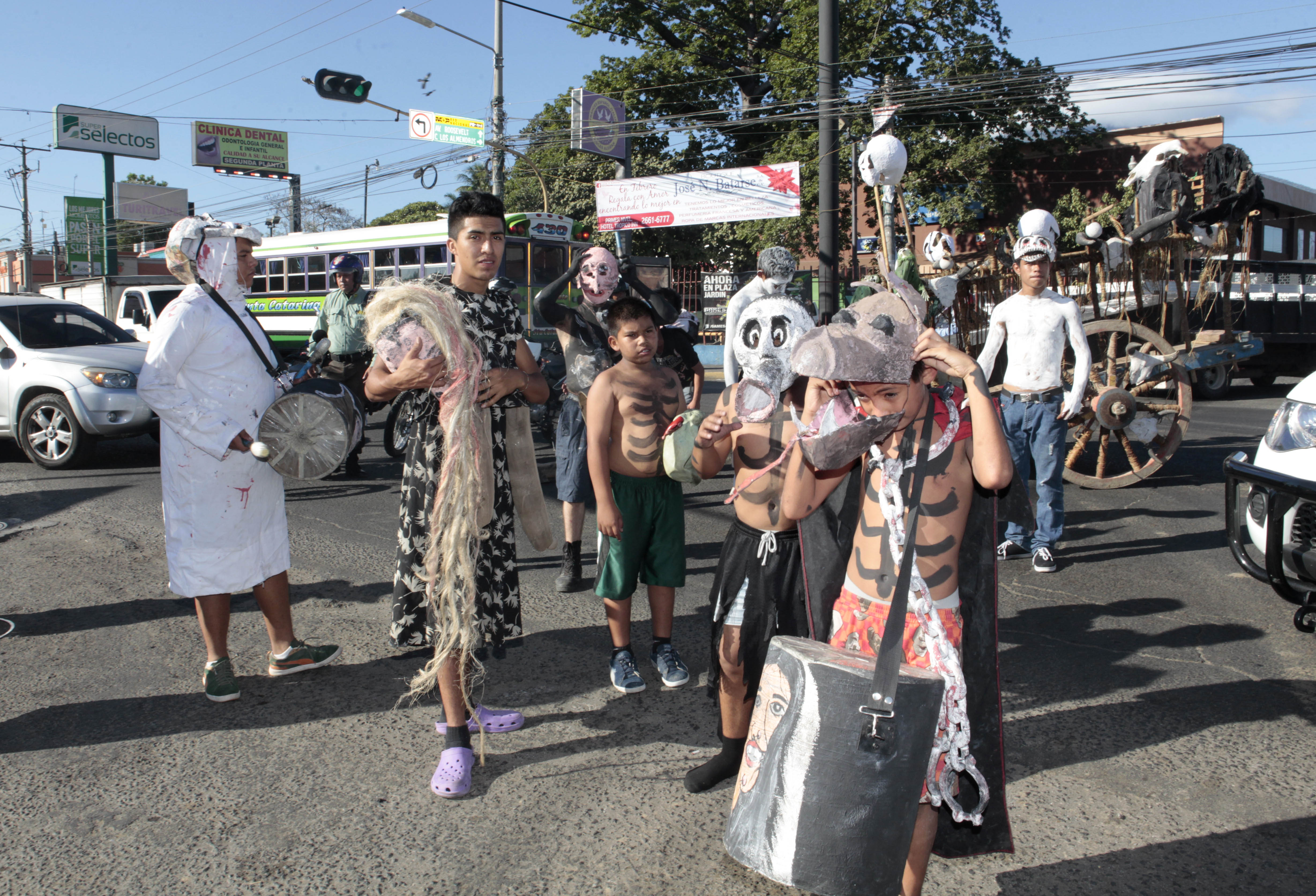
Salvadoran children dressed for Calabuiza on day of the dead

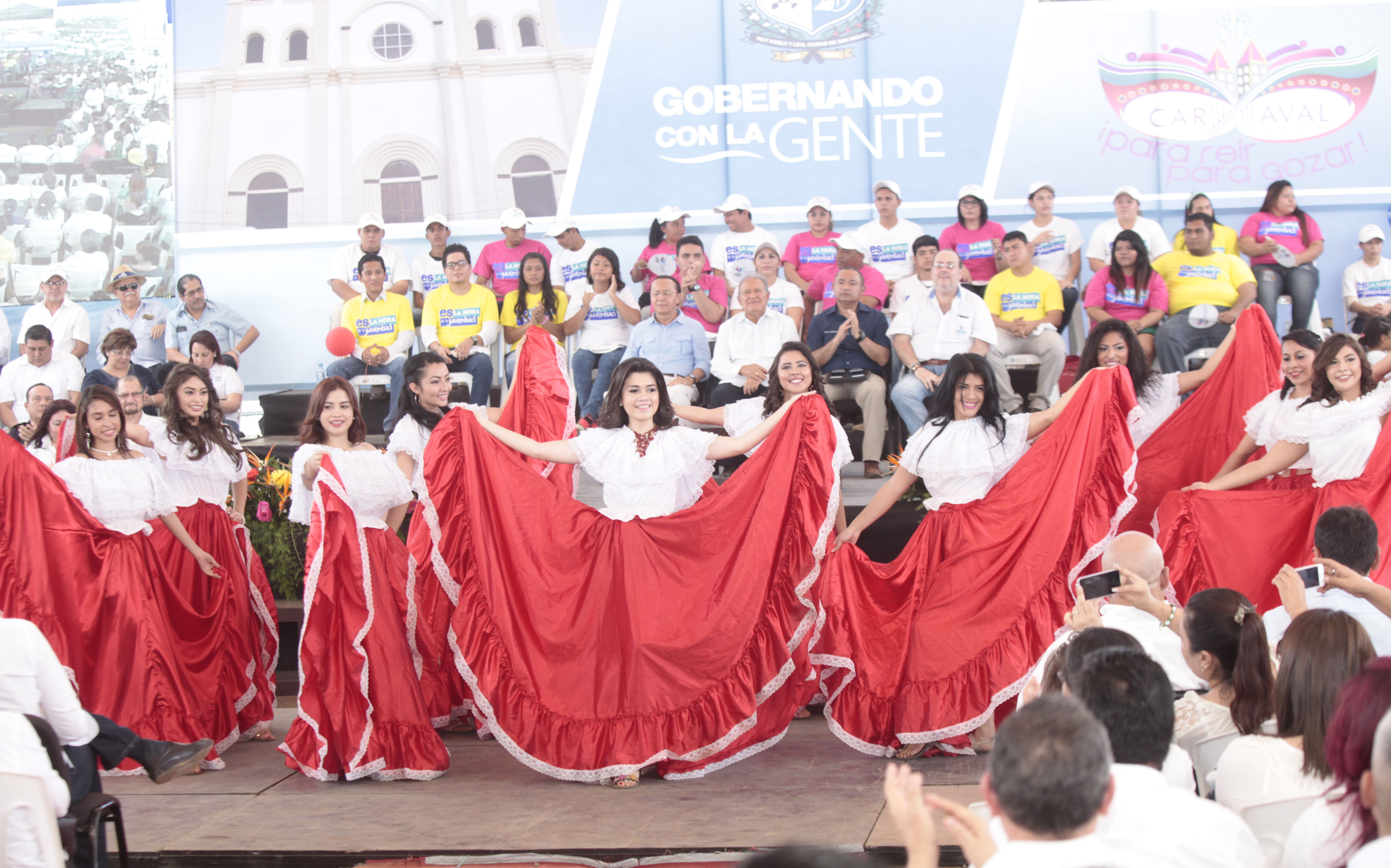
Young Salvadoran girls in San Miguel, El Salvador

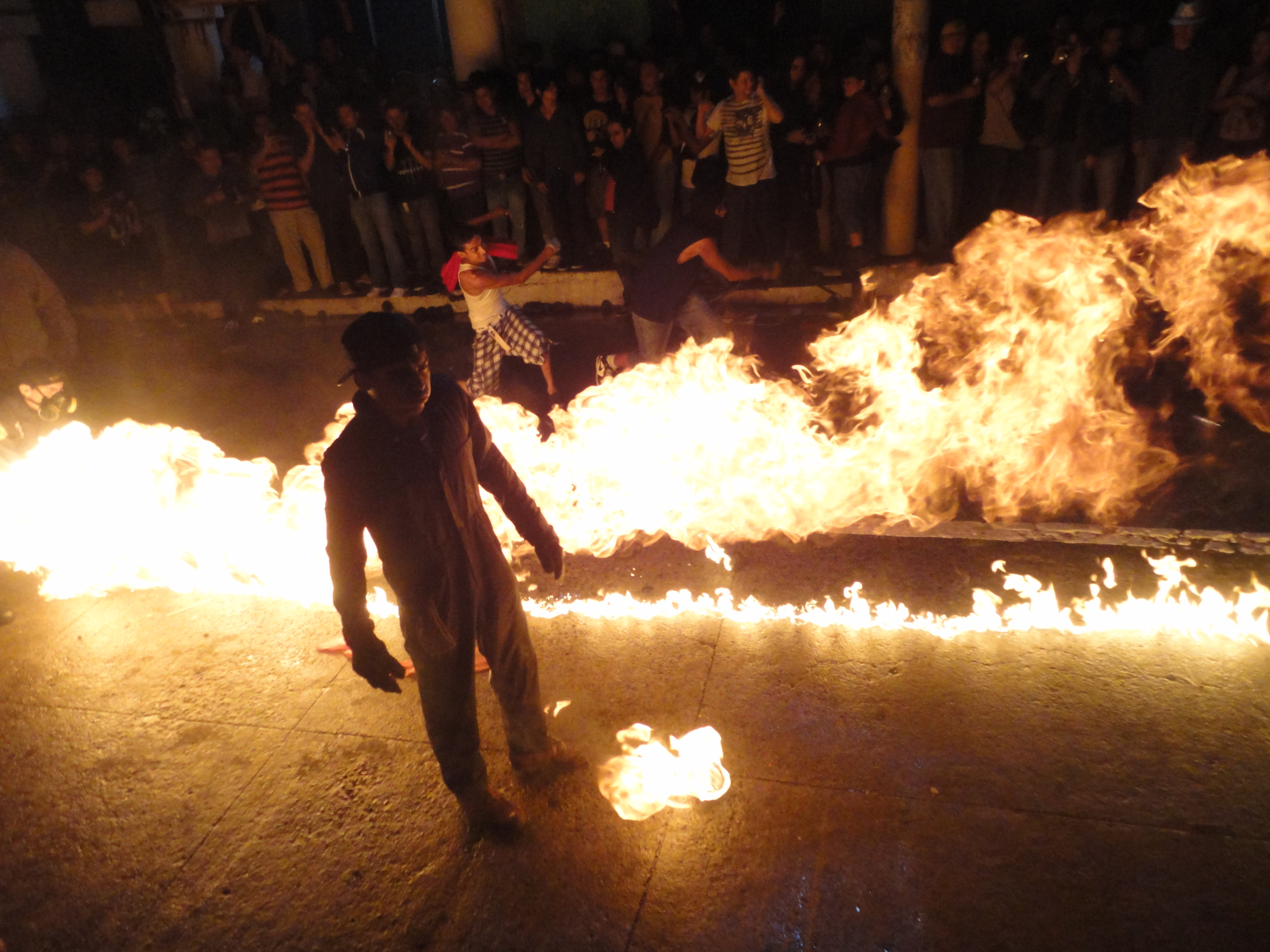
Fire ball festival in Nejapa

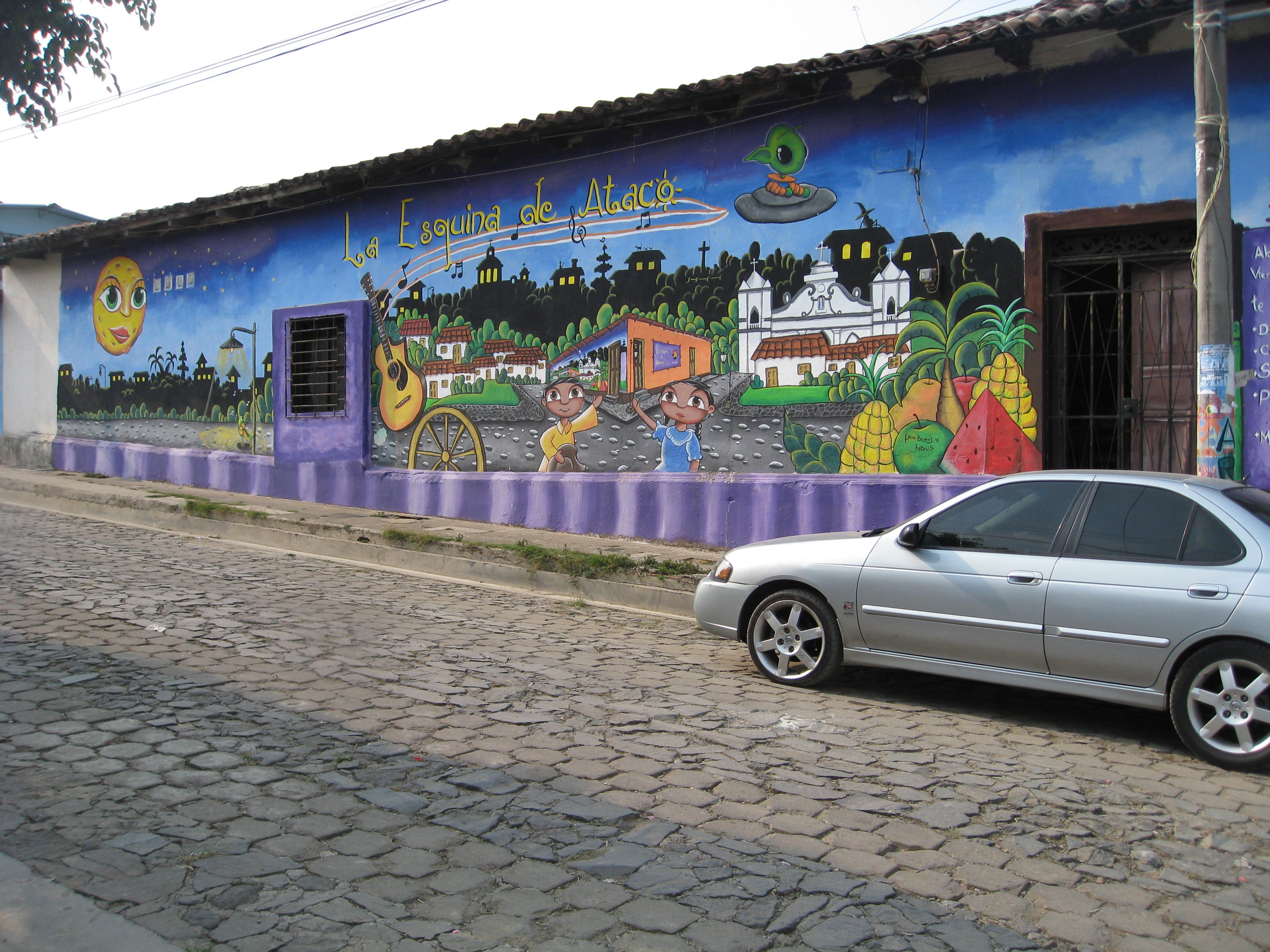
The town of Concepción de Ataco

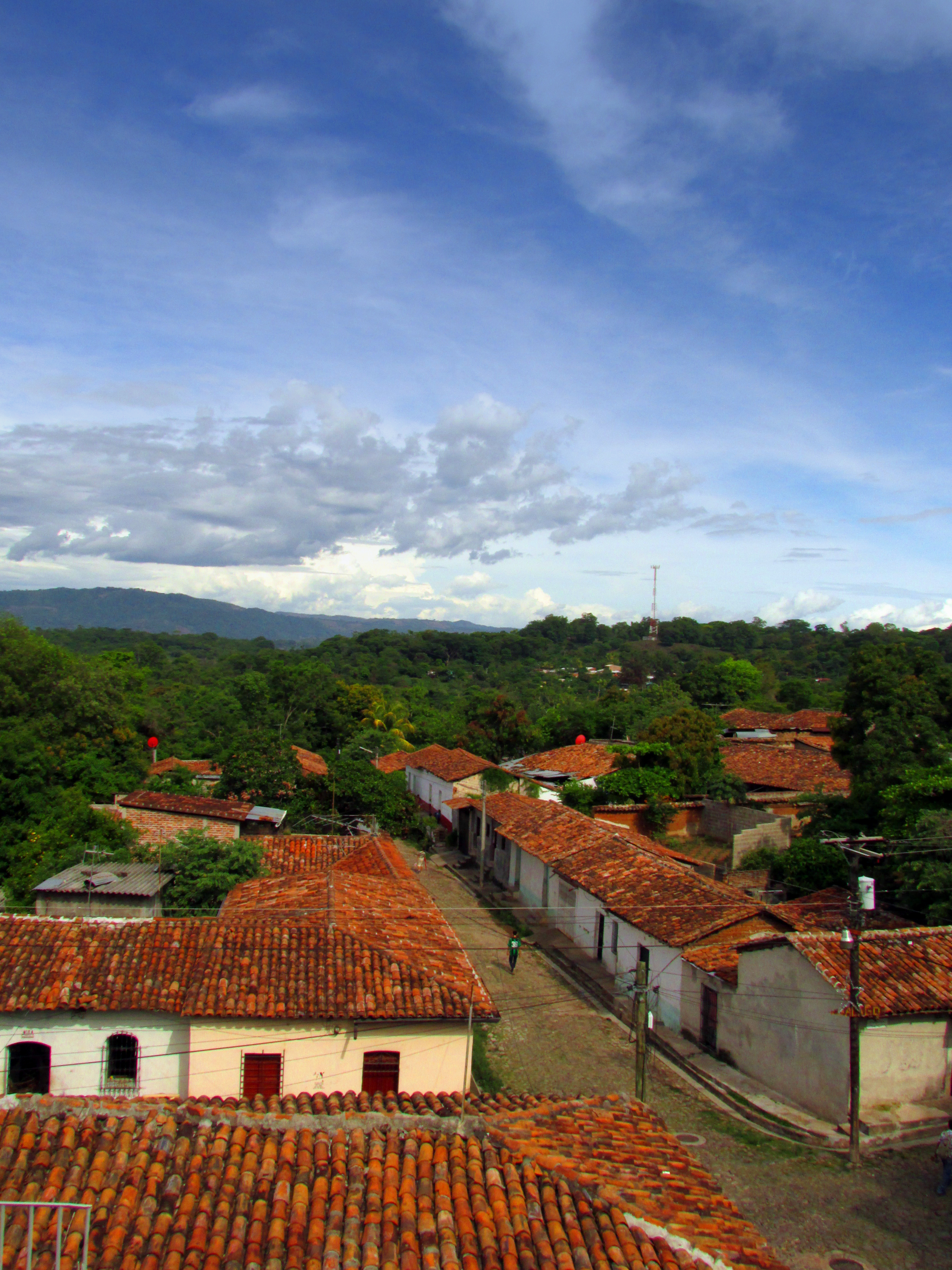
colonial houses of Suchitoto

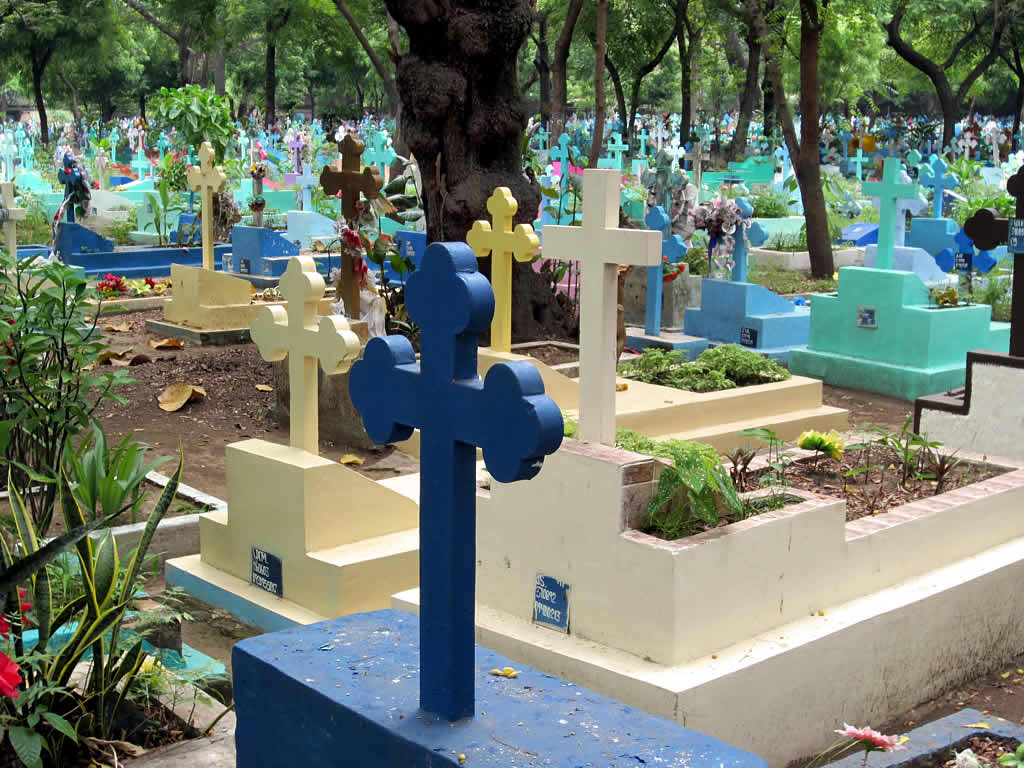
Colorful cemetery San Miguel, El Salvador

The culture of El Salvador is a Central American culture nation influenced by the clash of ancient Mesoamerica and medieval Iberian Peninsula. Salvadoran culture is influenced by Native American culture (Lenca people, Cacaopera people, Maya peoples, Pipil people) as well as Latin American culture (Latin America, Hispanic America, Ibero-America). Mestizo culture and the Catholic Church dominates the country. Although the Romance language, Castilian Spanish, is the official and dominant language spoken in El Salvador, Salvadoran Spanish which is part of Central American Spanish has influences of Native American languages of El Salvador such as Lencan languages, Cacaopera language, Mayan languages and Pipil language, which are still spoken in some regions of El Salvador.

Mestizo culture dominates the country, heavy in both Native American Indigenous and European Spanish influences. A new composite population was formed as a result of intermarrying between the native Mesoamerican population of Cuzcatlan with the European settlers. The Catholic Church plays an important role in the Salvadoran culture. Archbishop Óscar Romero is a national hero for his role in resisting human rights violations that were occurring in the lead-up to the Salvadoran Civil War. Significant foreign personalities in El Salvador were the Jesuit priests and professors Ignacio Ellacuría, Ignacio Martín-Baró, and Segundo Montes, who were murdered in 1989 by the Salvadoran Army during the height of the civil war.

Painting, ceramics and textiles are the principal manual artistic mediums. Writers Francisco Gavidia (1863–1955), Salarrué (Salvador Salazar Arrué) (1899–1975), Claudia Lars, Alfredo Espino, Pedro Geoffroy Rivas, Manlio Argueta, José Roberto Cea, and poet Roque Dalton are among the most important writers from El Salvador. Notable 20th-century personages include the late filmmaker Baltasar Polio, female film director Patricia Chica, artist Fernando Llort, and caricaturist Toño Salazar.

Amongst the more renowned representatives of the graphic arts are the painters Augusto Crespin, Noe Canjura, Carlos Cañas, Giovanni Gil, Julia Díaz, Mauricio Mejía, María Elena Palomo de Mejía, Camilo Minero, Ricardo Carbonell, Roberto Huezo, Miguel Ángel Cerna, (the painter and writer better known as MACLo), Esael Araujo, and many others. For more information on prominent citizens of El Salvador, check the List of Salvadorans.

== Notable Salvadoran people ==
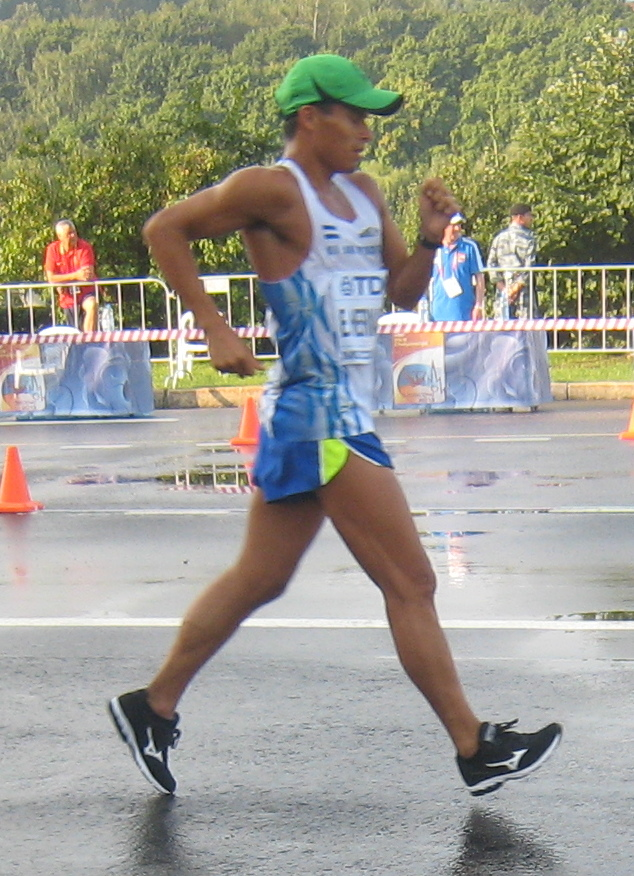
Emerson Hernández is a Salvadorean race walker.

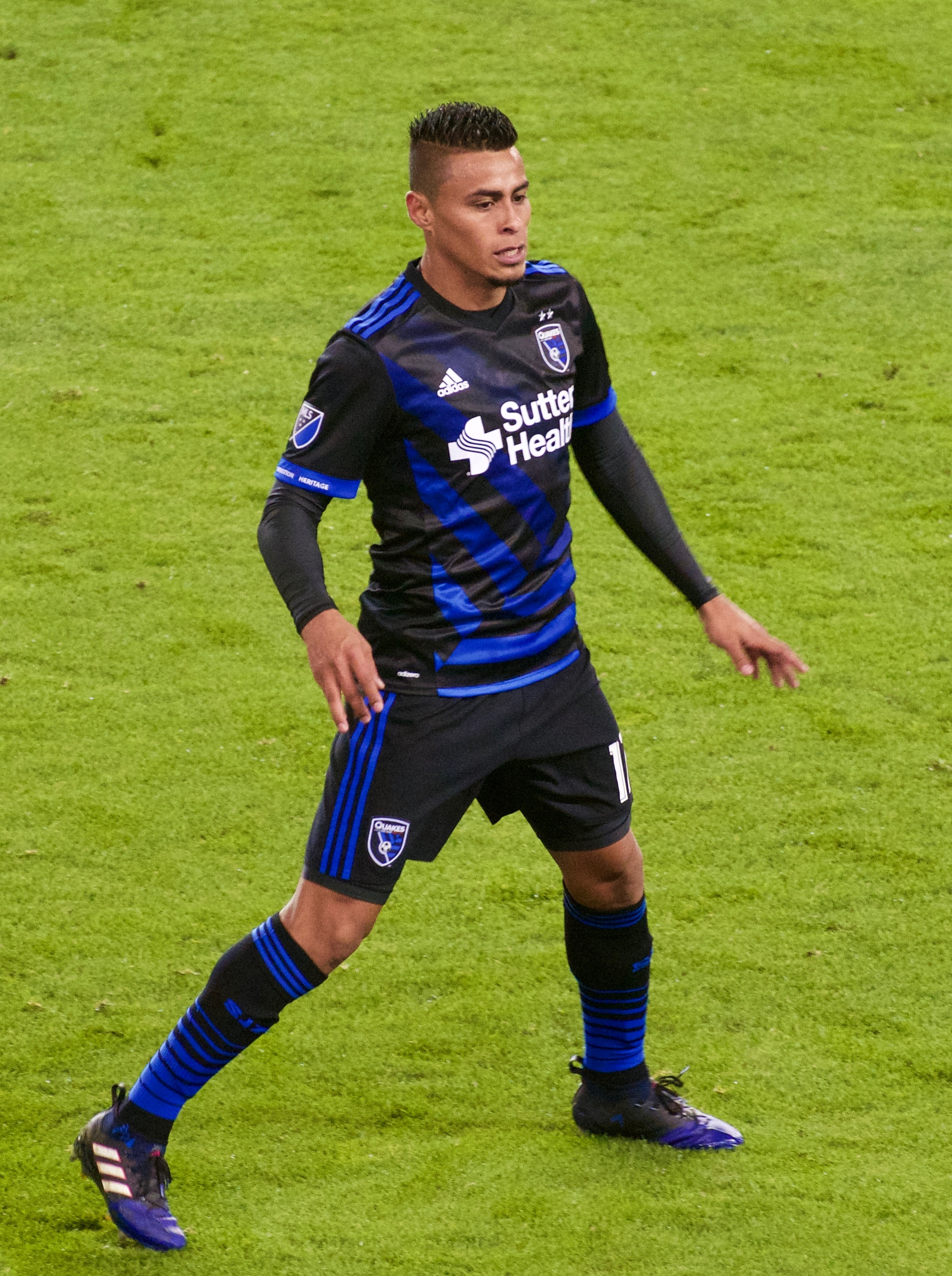
Darwin Cerén is a Salvadoran footballer who plays for the Major League Soccer club San Jose Earthquakes and is captain of the El Salvador national team

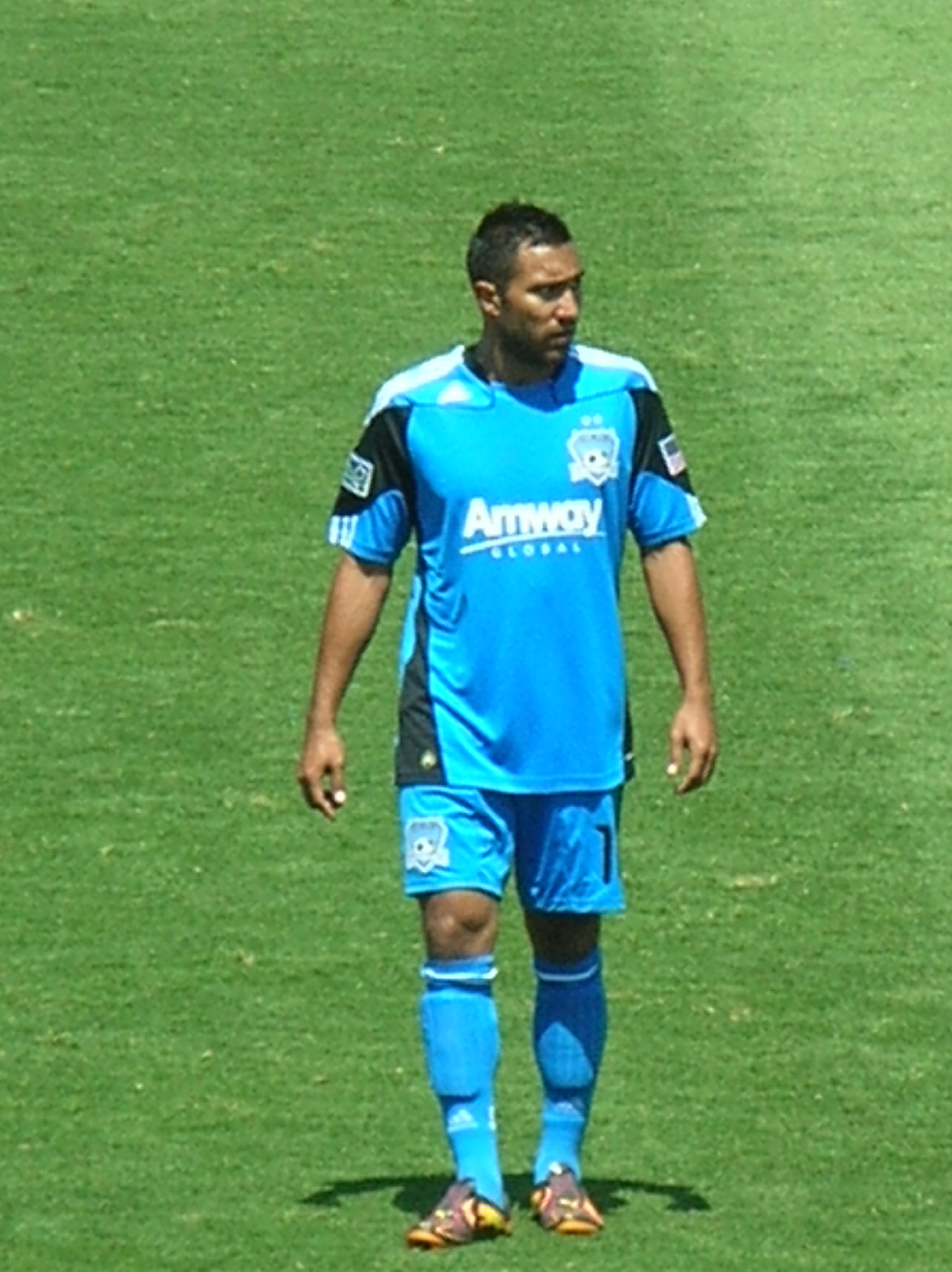
Arturo Álvarez (footballer, born 1985) is a Salvadoran American footballer who plays as a winger and forward for Major League Soccer club Chicago Fire

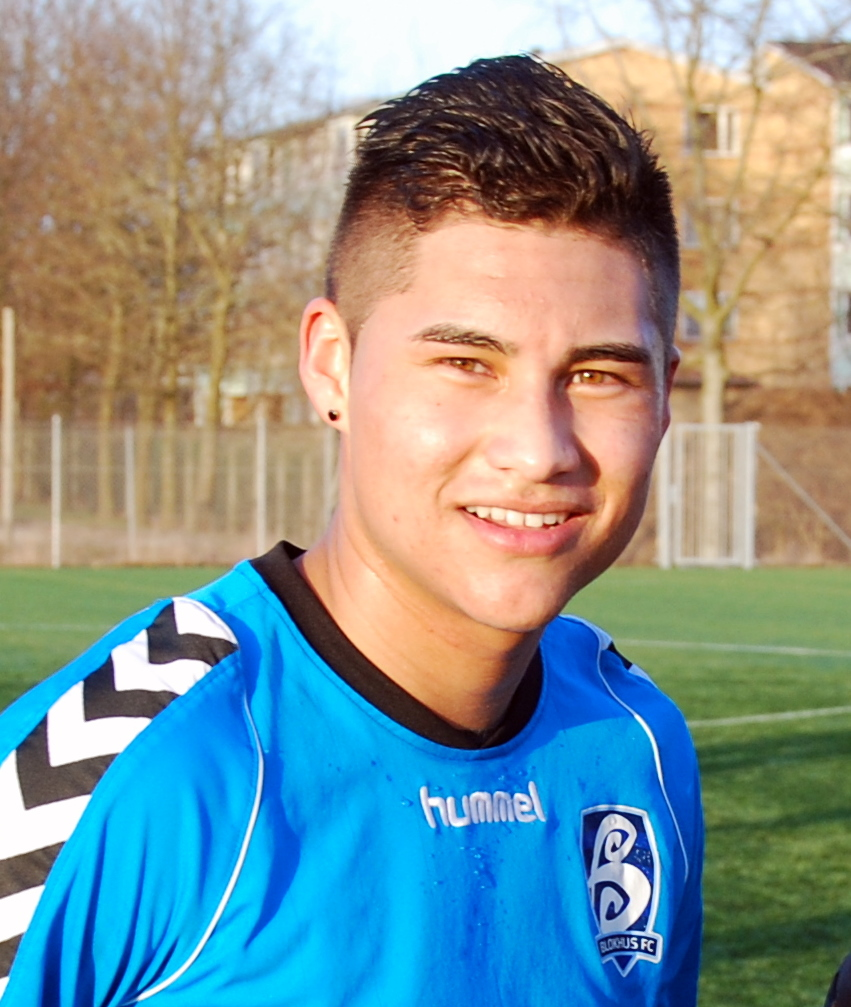
Dustin Corea is a Salvadoran international footballer who plays for FC Edmonton.

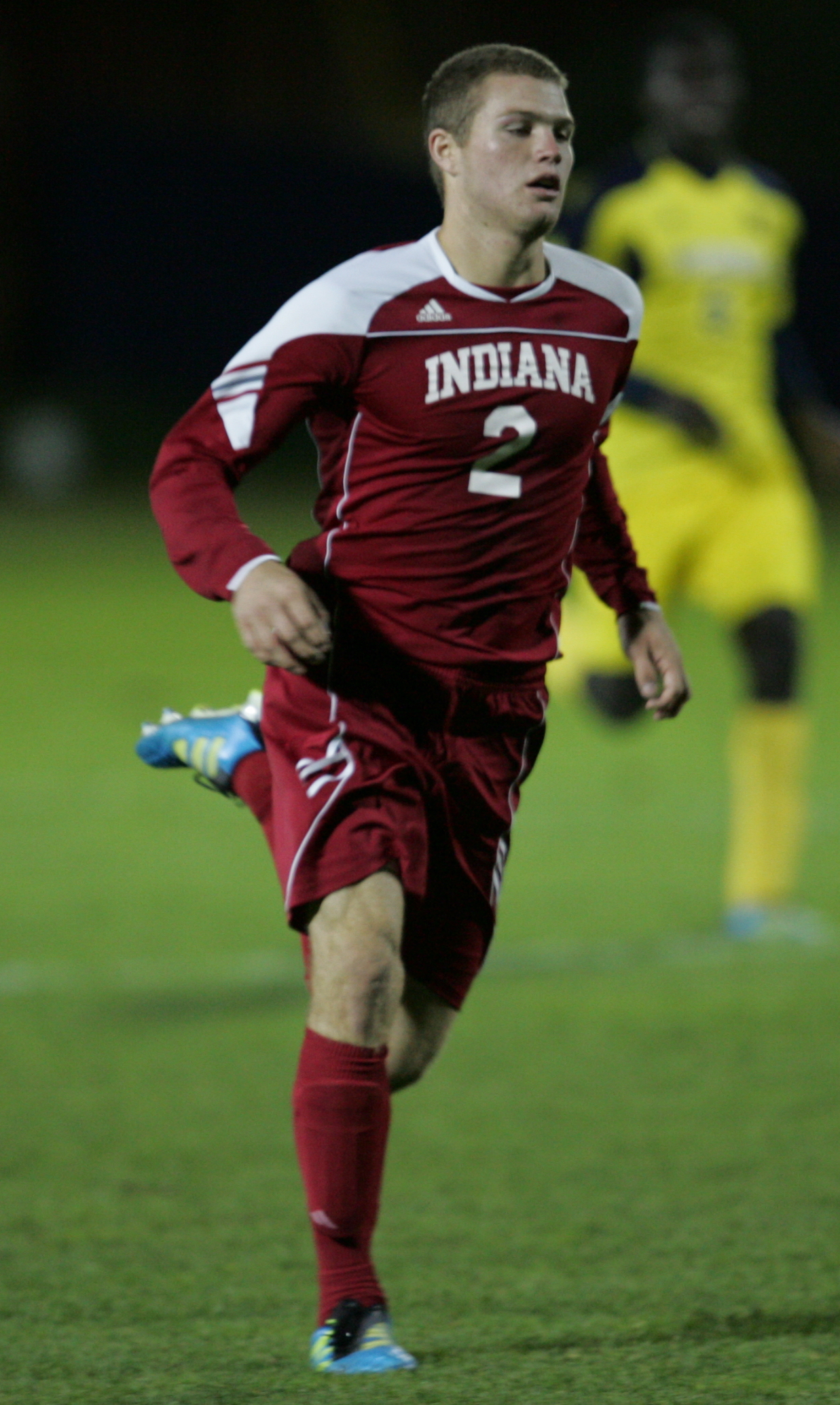
Eriq Zavaleta is an American soccer player who plays as a center back for Toronto FC of Major League Soccer.

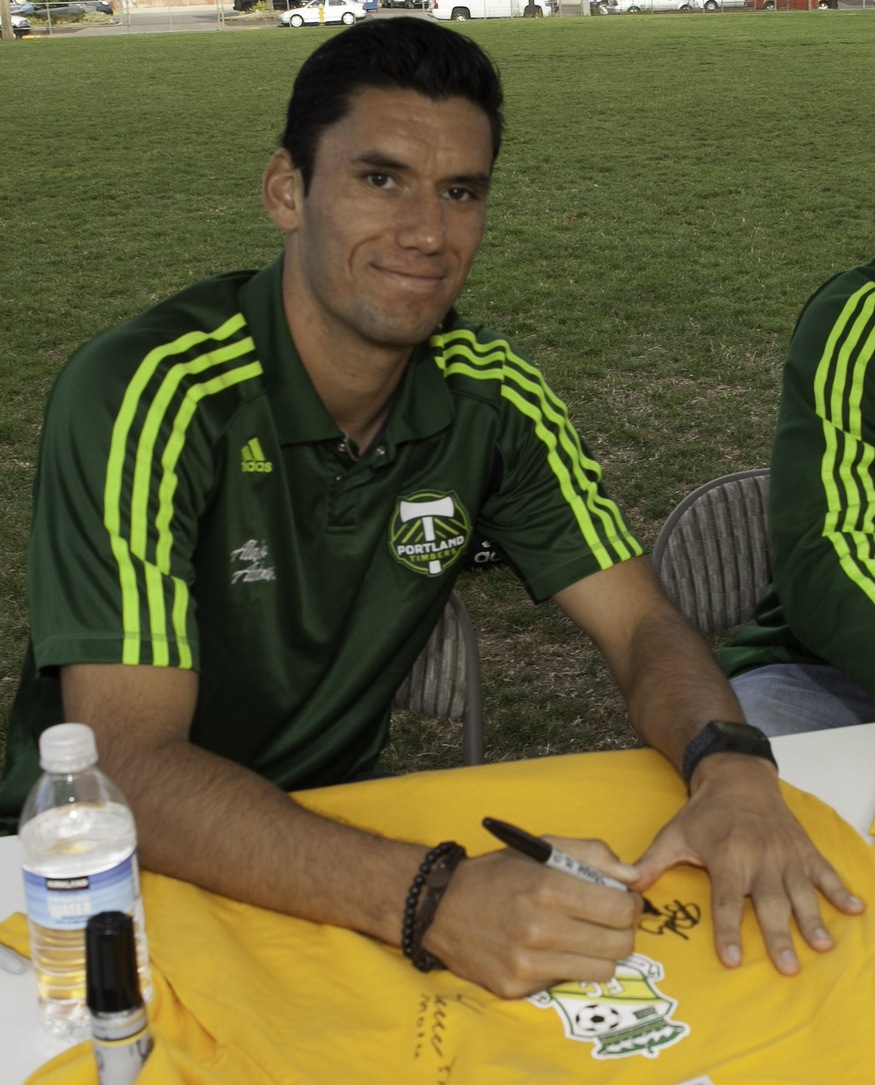
Steve Purdy is a Salvadoran American footballer who plays as a defender for Orange County Blues in the USL. He has played for the El Salvador national team at the CONCACAF Gold Cup in 2011 and 2013.

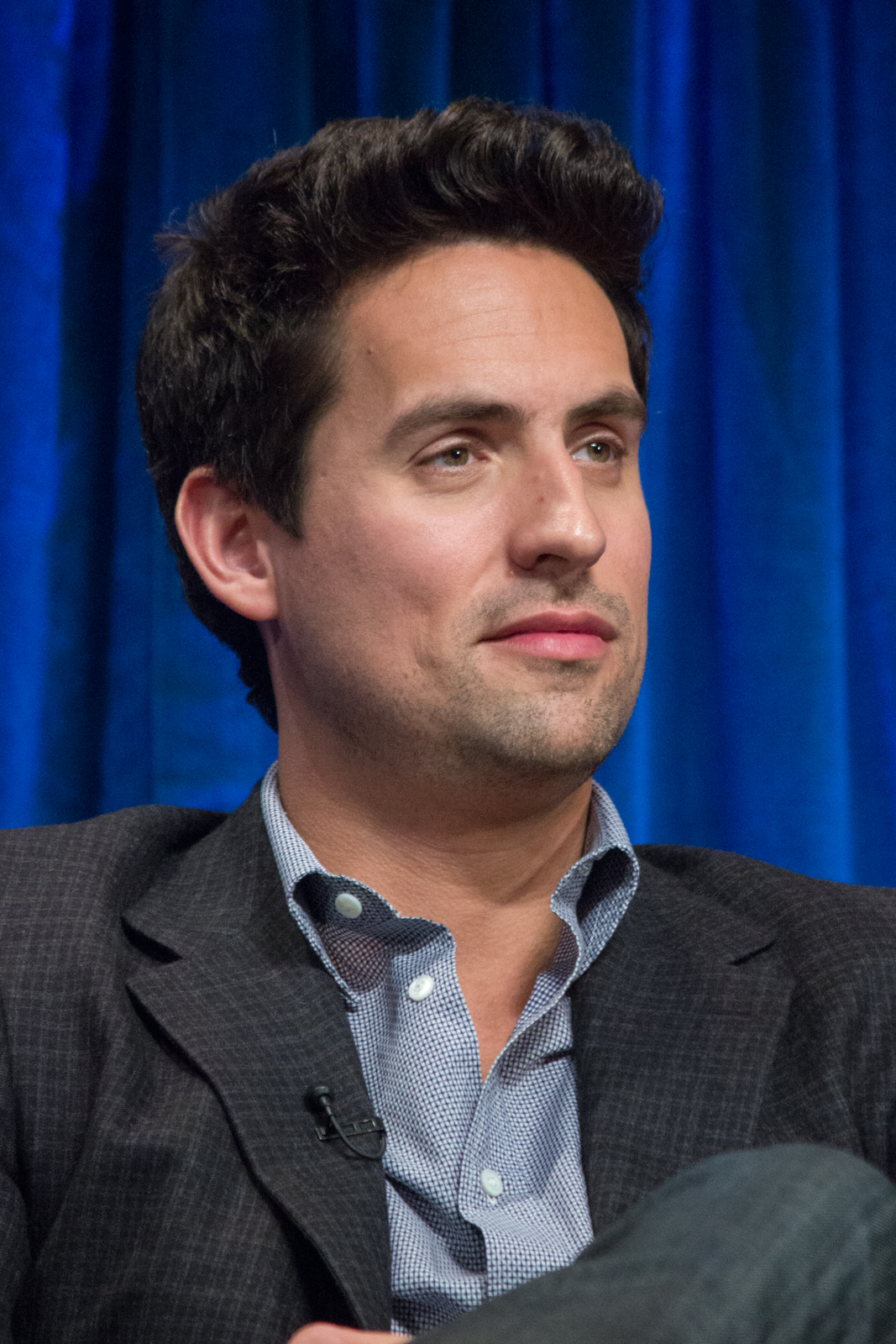
Ed Weeks is an English actor, comedian, writer and producer. He played Dr. Jeremy Reed on the Fox comedy series The Mindy Project. Born and raised in England, his mother is a native of El Salvador

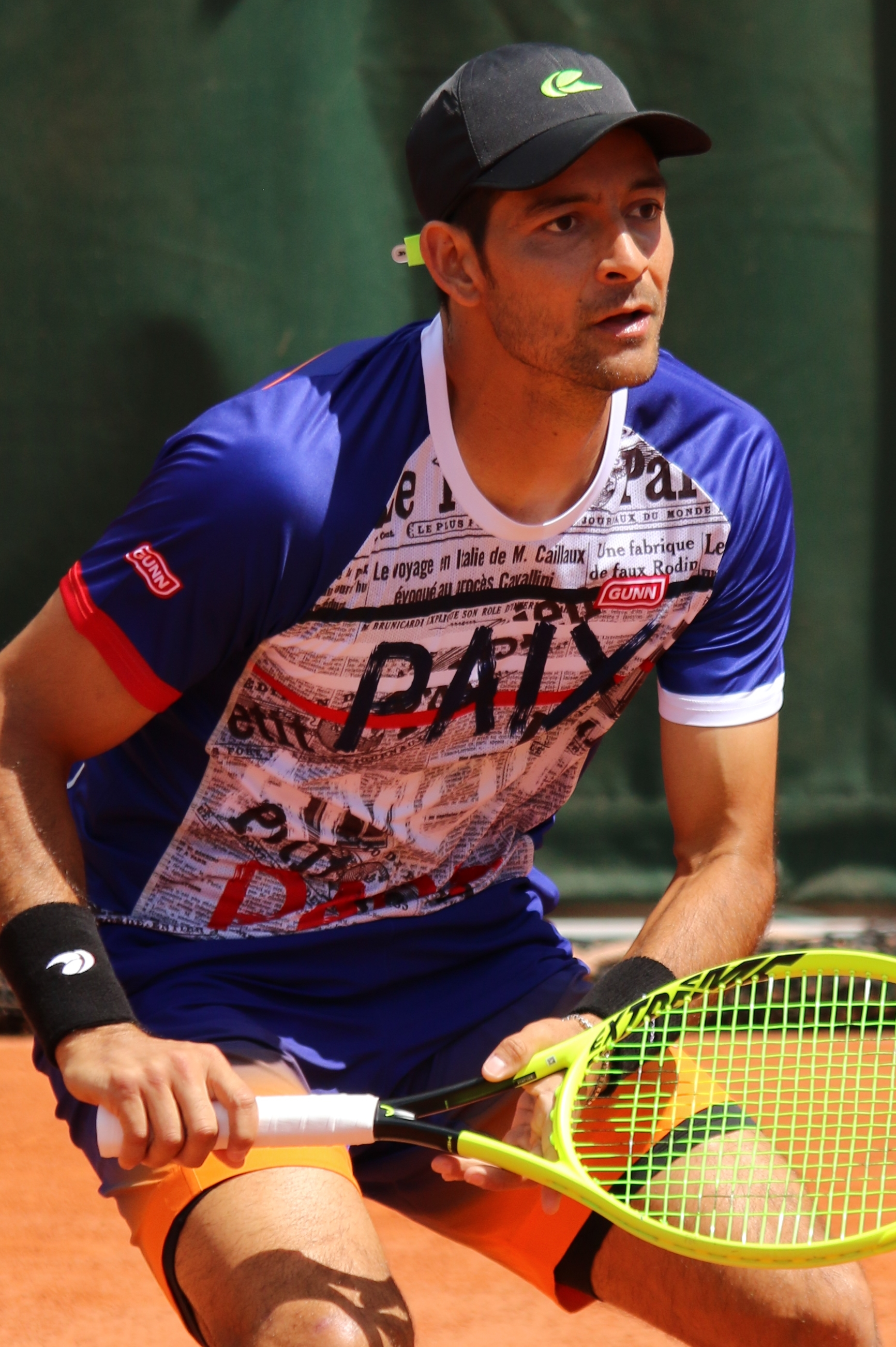
Marcelo Arévalo is a professional Salvadoran tennis player

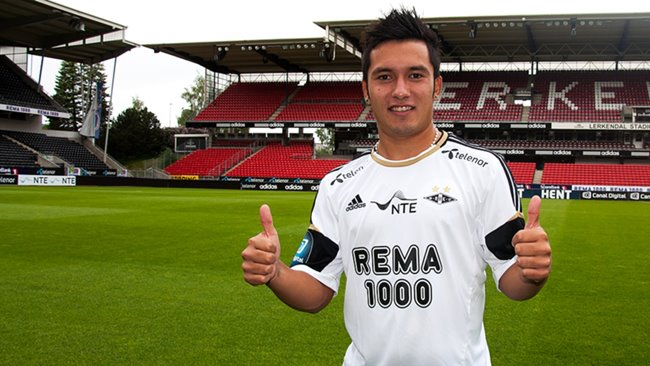
Jaime Alas is a Salvadoran professional footballer

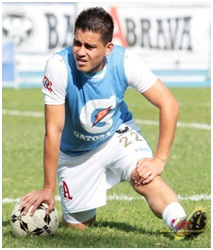
Rodolfo Zelaya is a Salvadoran professional footballer

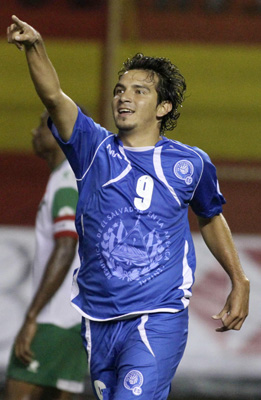
Rafael Burgos is a Salvadoran professional forward

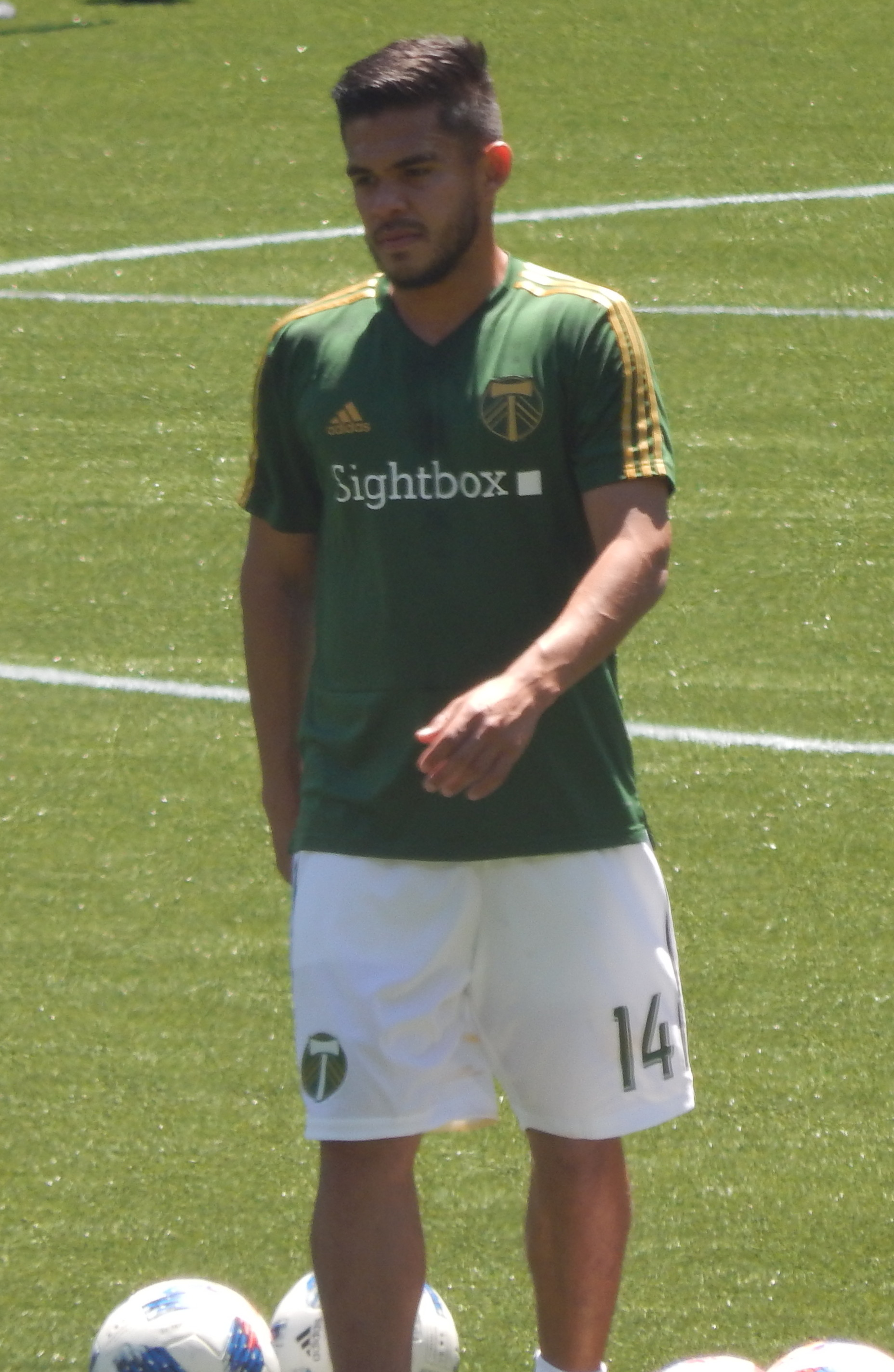
Andrés Flores is a Salvadoran professional footballer, who plays for the Portland Timbers in Major League Soccer.

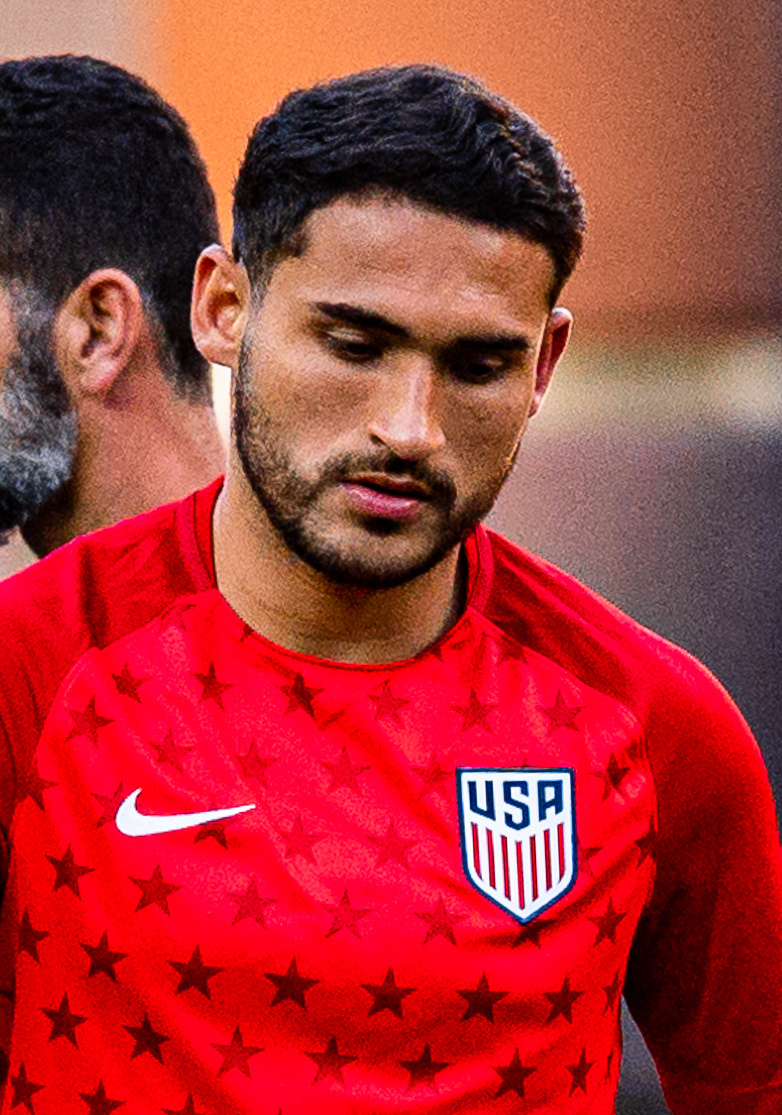
Cristian Roldan is an American professional soccer player, who currently plays as a midfielder for Seattle Sounders FC in Major League Soccer

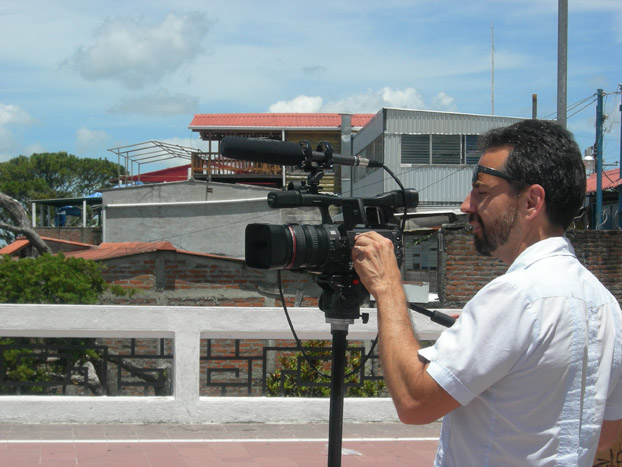
Marcos Villatoro is a writer from the United States. He is the author of six novels, two collections of poetry and a memoir, and the producer/director of the documentary “Tamale Road: A Memoir from El Salvador.”

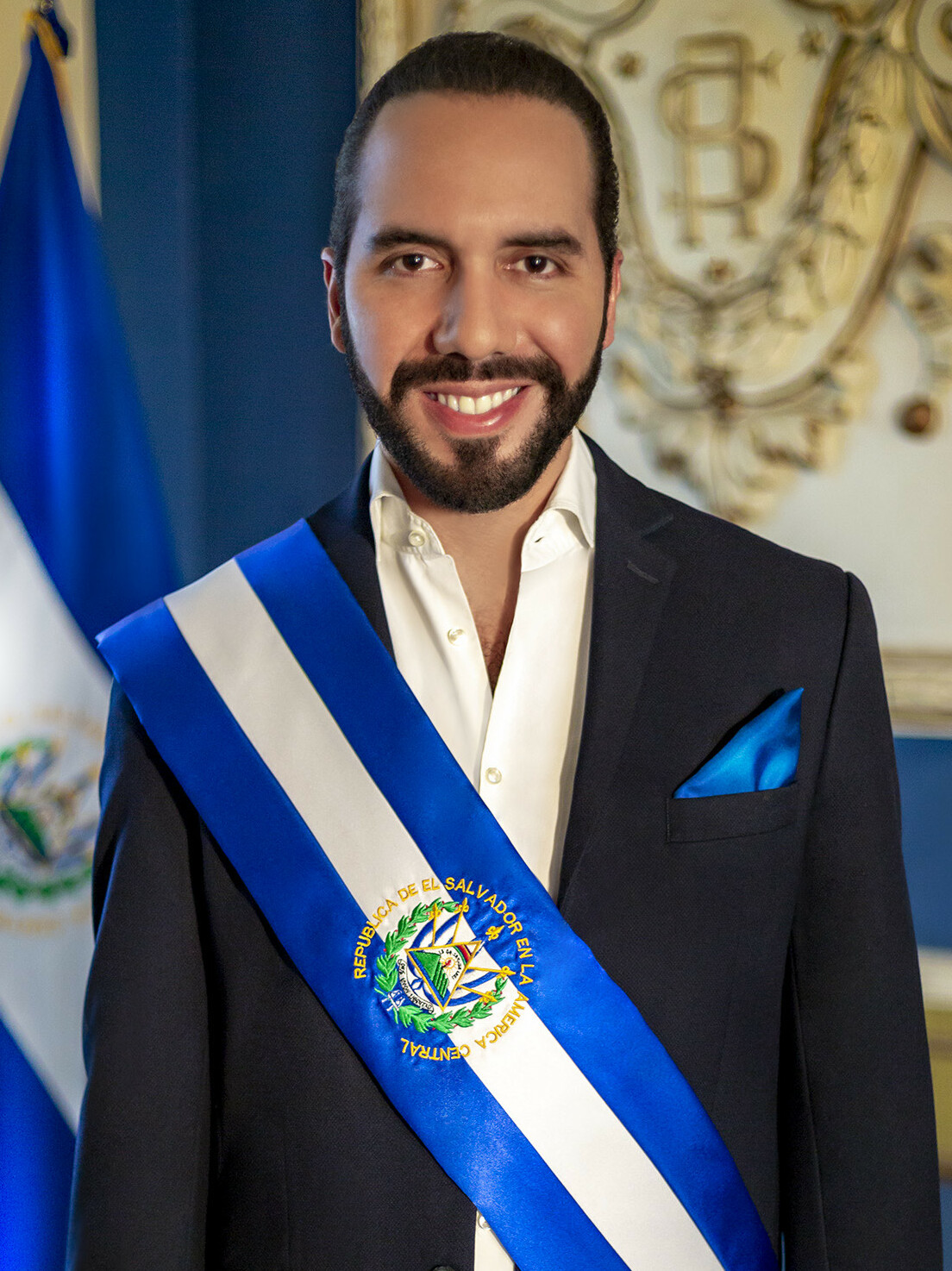
Nayib Bukele is a Salvadoran politician and businessman

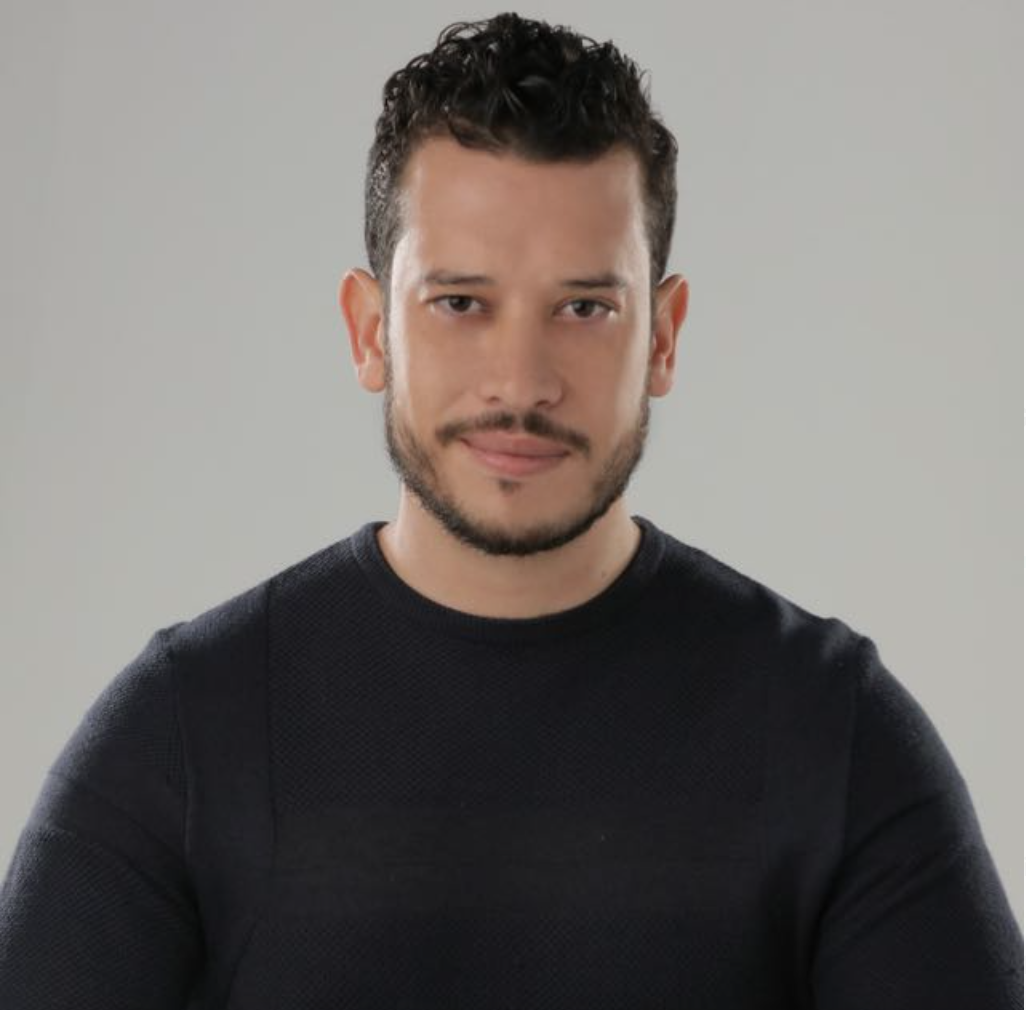
Guillermo Hasbún, president of CIFCO

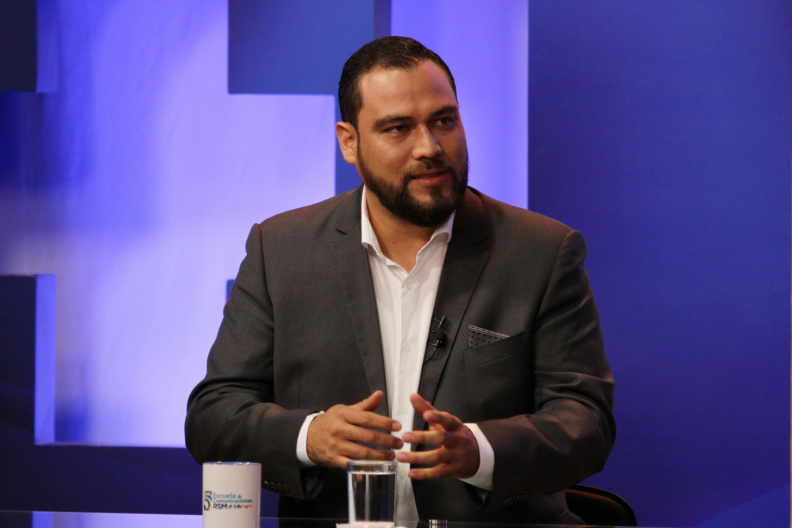
Mario Durán, minister of governance

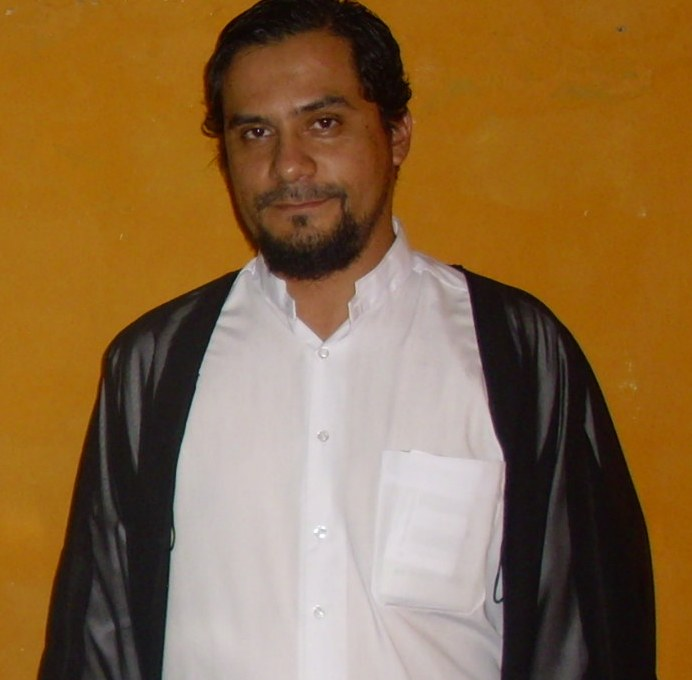
Mustafa Al-Salvadori, president of the shia islamic association

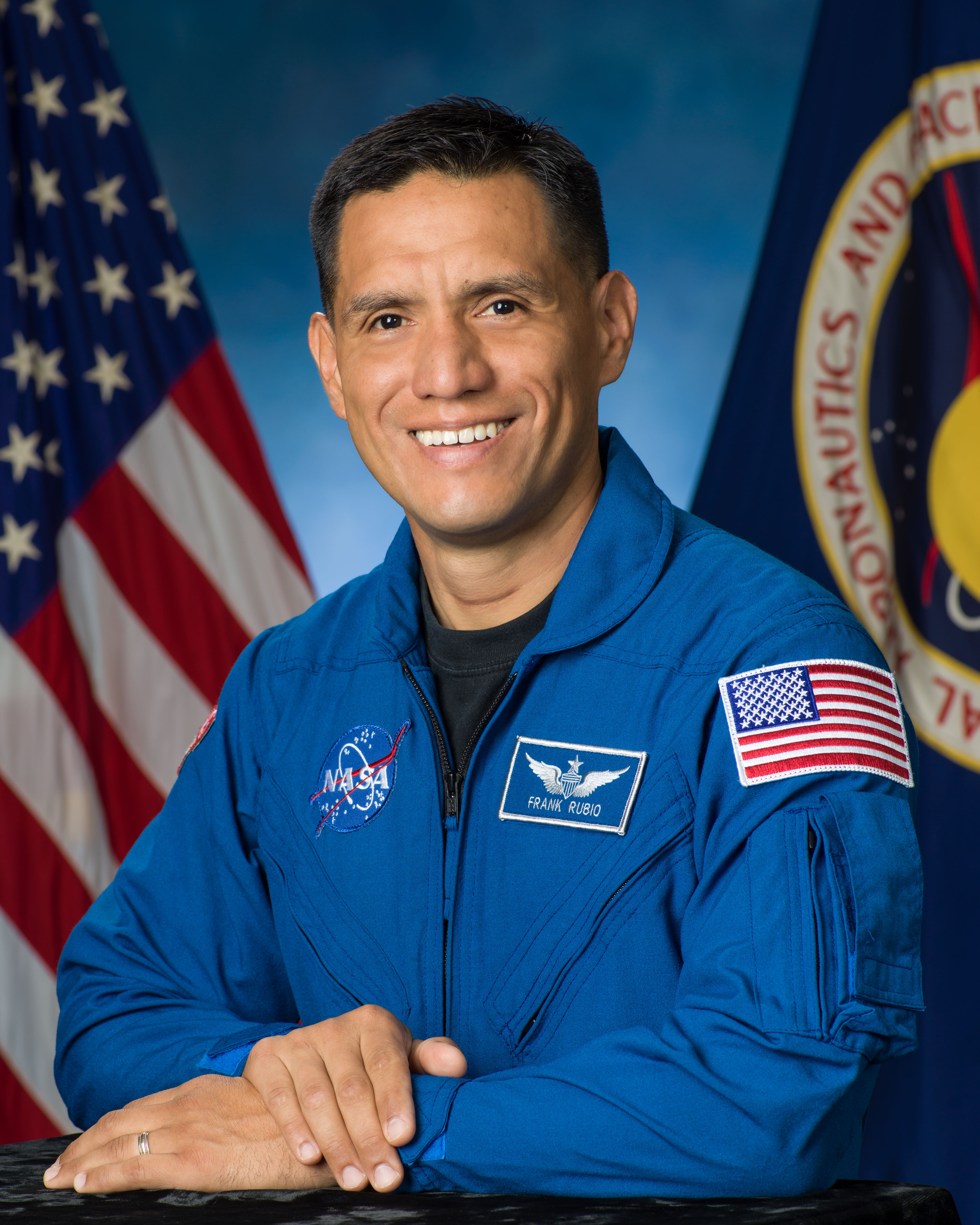
Francisco Rubio (astronaut) is a US Army helicopter pilot, flight surgeon, and NASA astronaut candidate of the class of 2017.

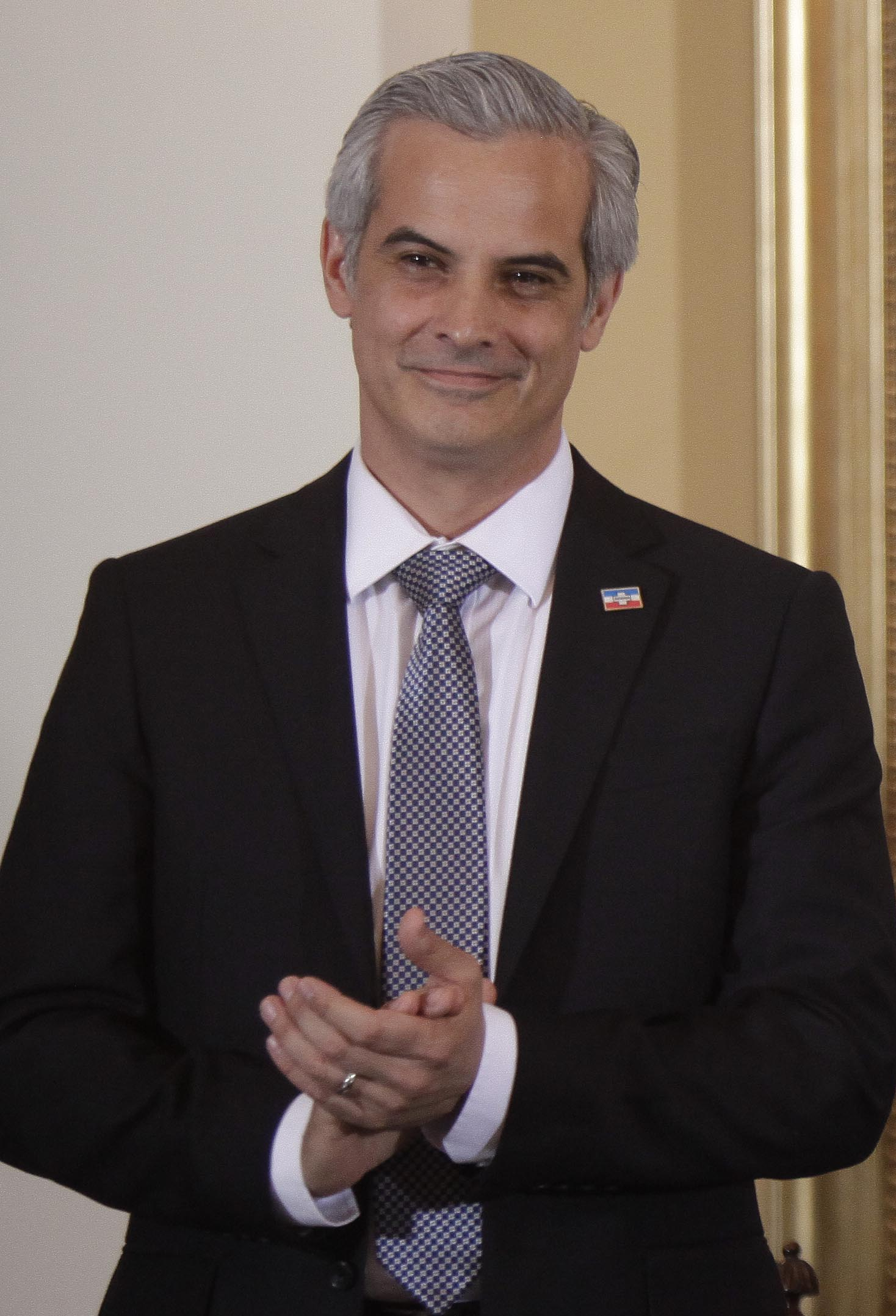
Mauricio Interiano is a Salvadoran politician

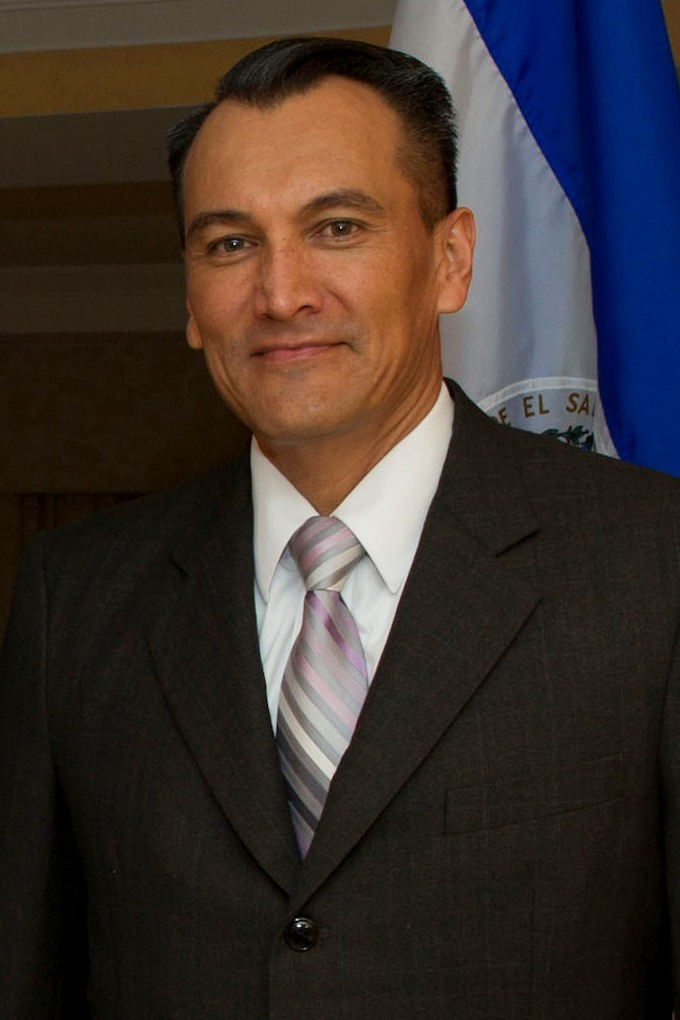
José Atilio Benítez Parada is Salvadoran General, ambassador and former Minister of Defense.

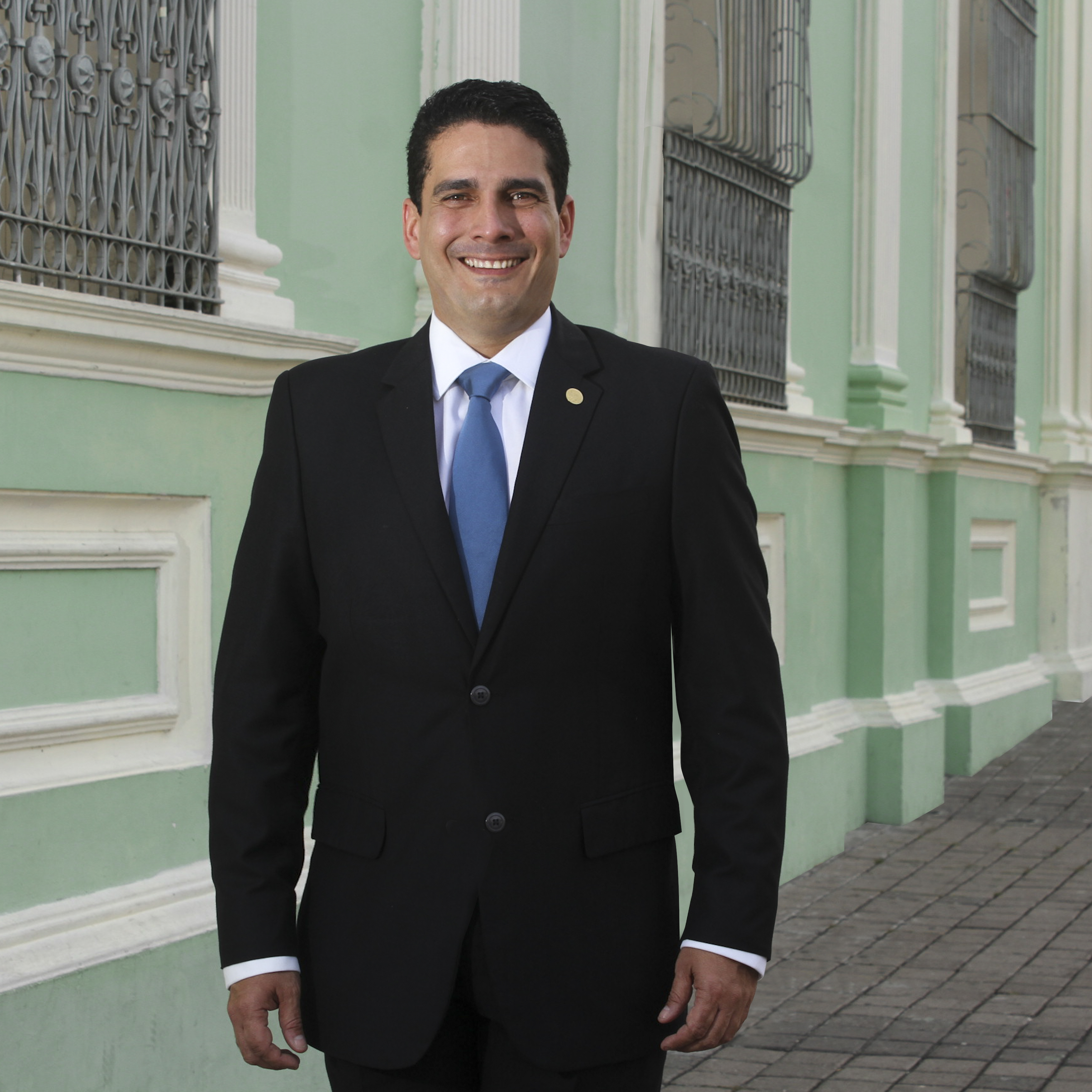
Roberto José d'Aubuisson Munguía is a Salvadoran politician

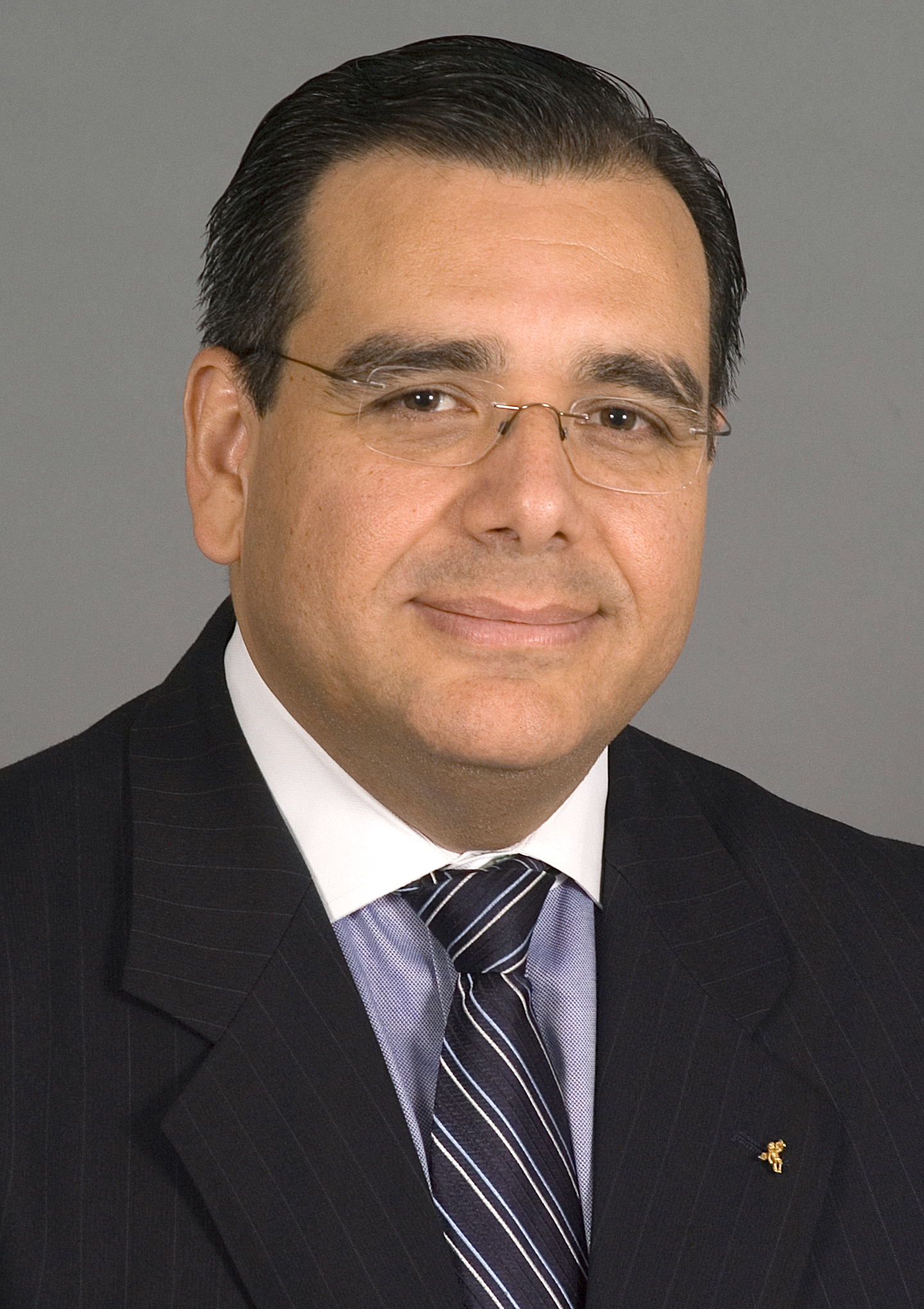
Juan Jose Daboub is the chairman and CEO of The Daboub Partnership, Founding Chief Executive Officer of the Global Adaptation Institute and former managing director of the World Bank (2006–2010)

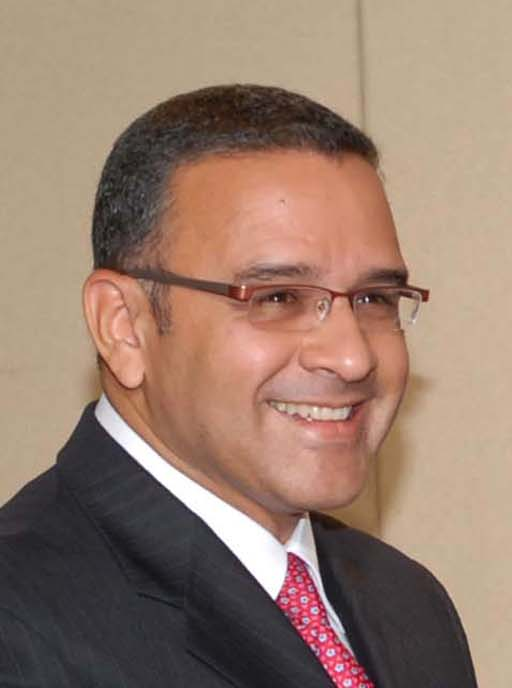
Mauricio Funes is a Salvadoran politician who was President of El Salvador from June 1, 2009 to June 1, 2014

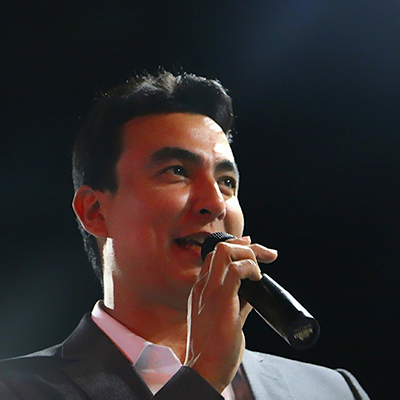
Miguel Ángel Pereira, politician

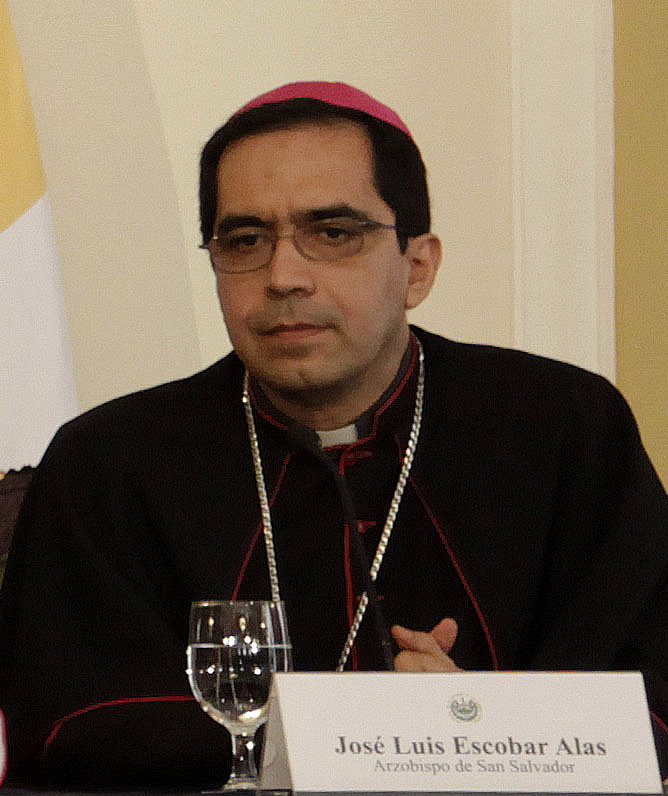
José Luis Escobar Alas, Archbishop of San Salvador

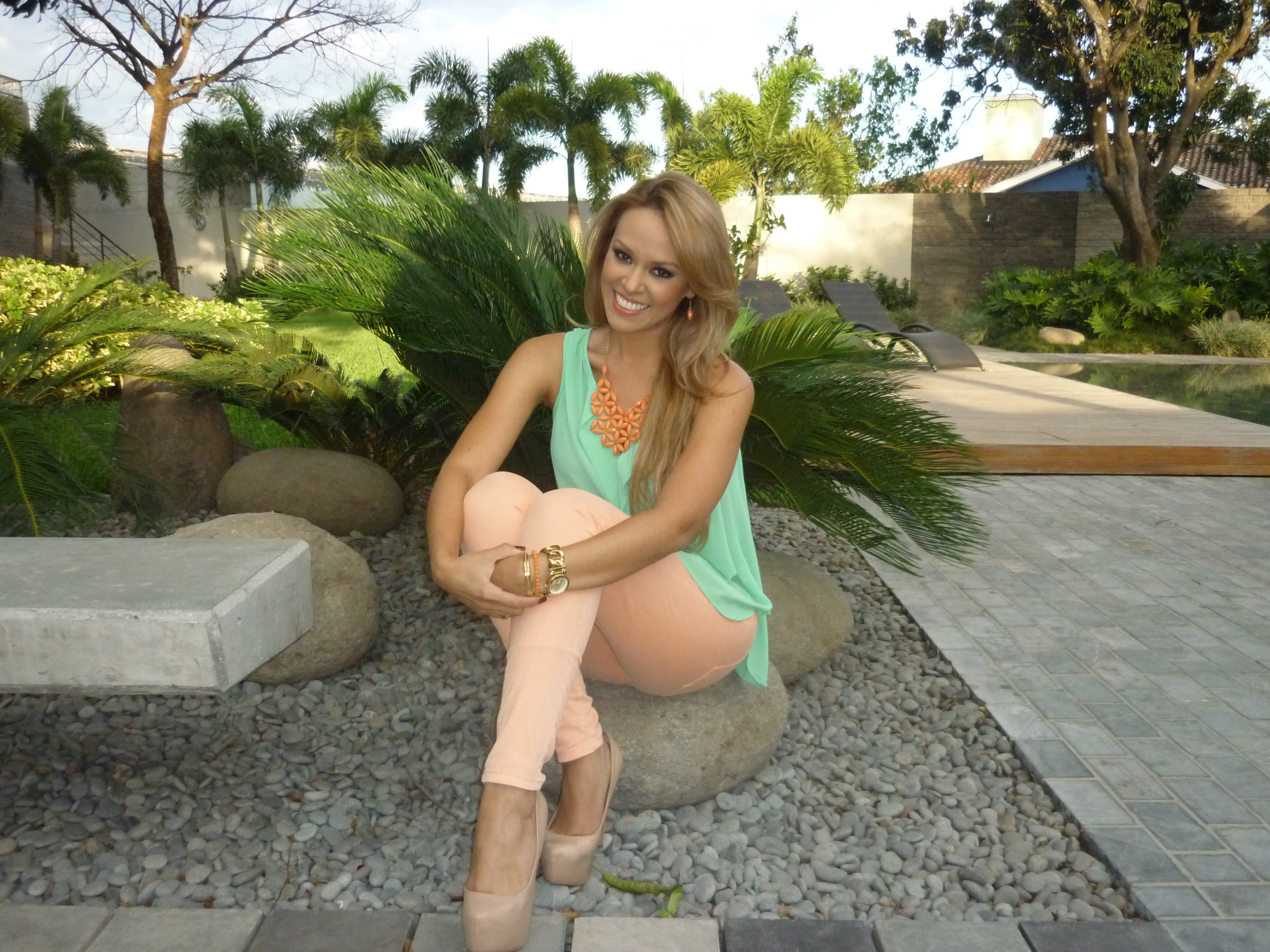
Luciana Sandoval is a Salvadoran presenter, dancer and former model.

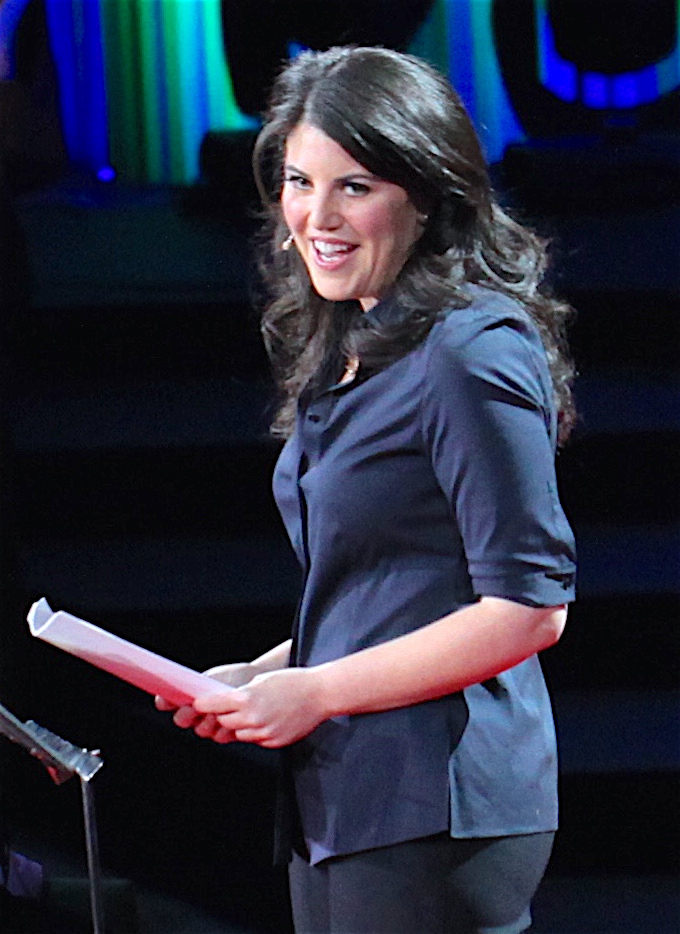
Monica Lewinsky's father Bernard Lewinsky was born in San Salvador, El Salvador, Central America

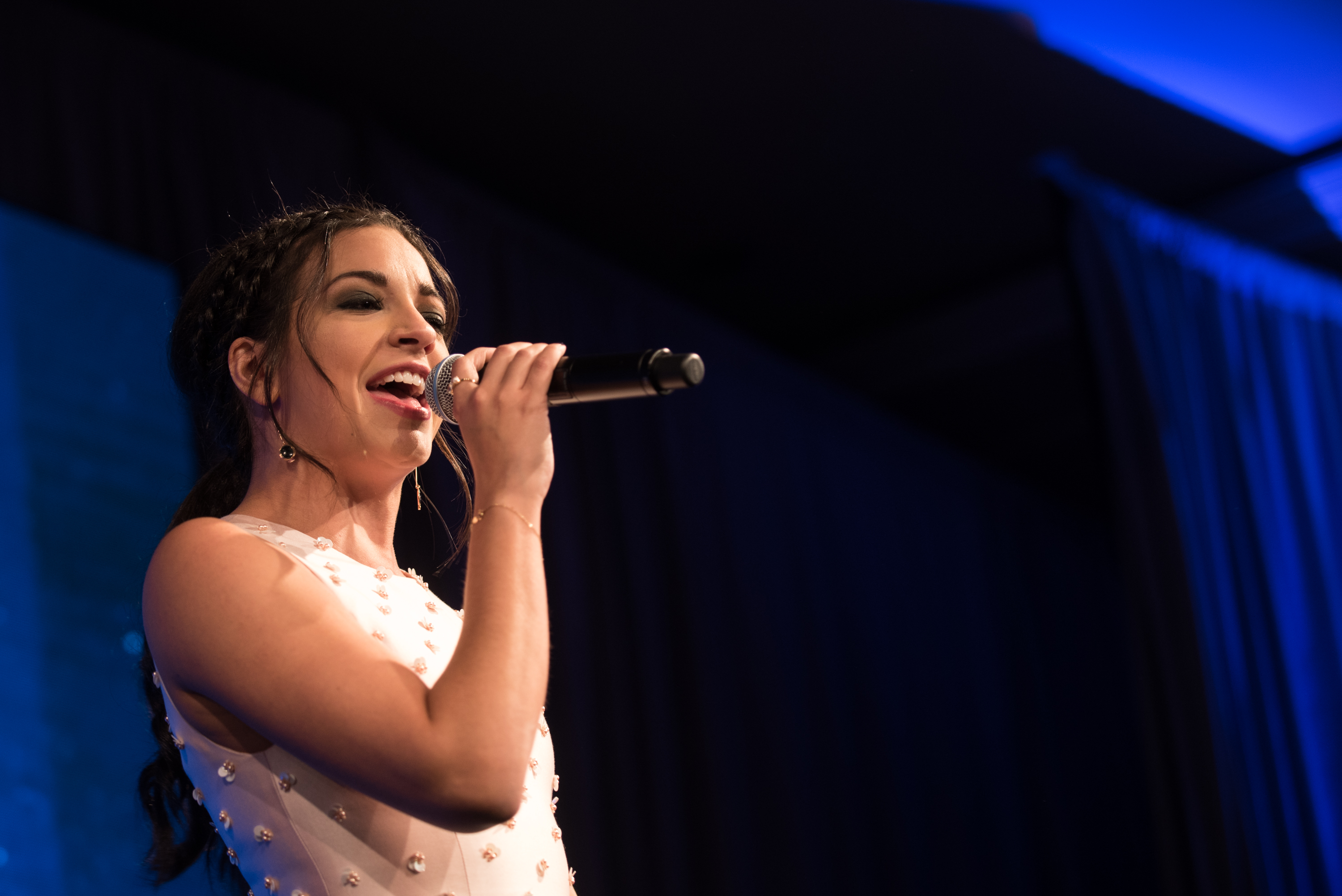
Ana Villafañe is an actress and singer

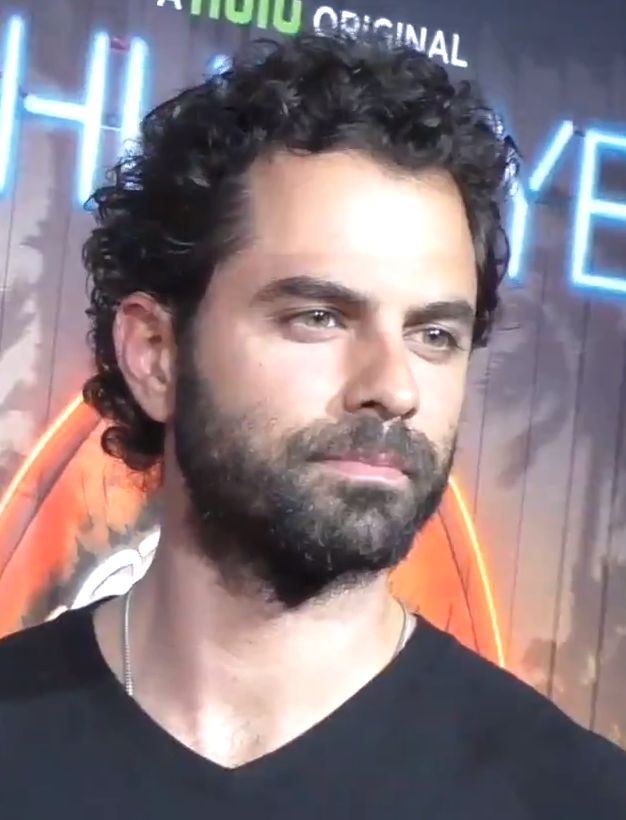
Adrian Bellani is an actor

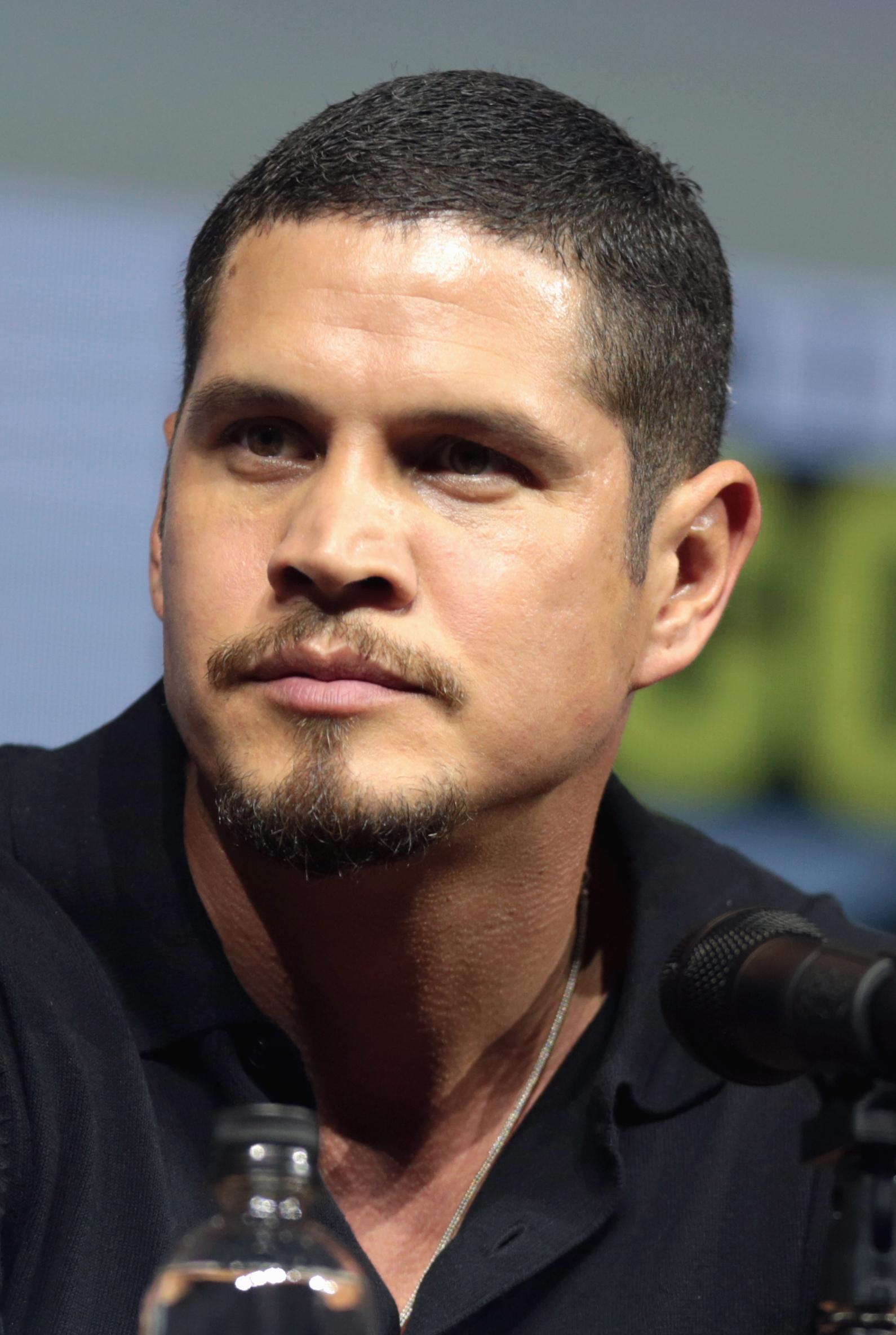
J. D. Pardo is an actor

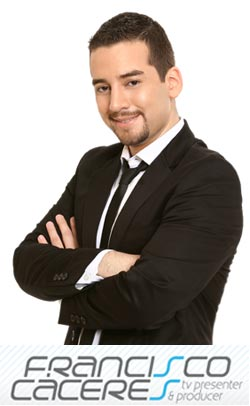
Francisco Caceres is a TV host and producer. He's currently the Film Expert for Telemundo’s national morning show, Un Nuevo Día based in Miami, Florida

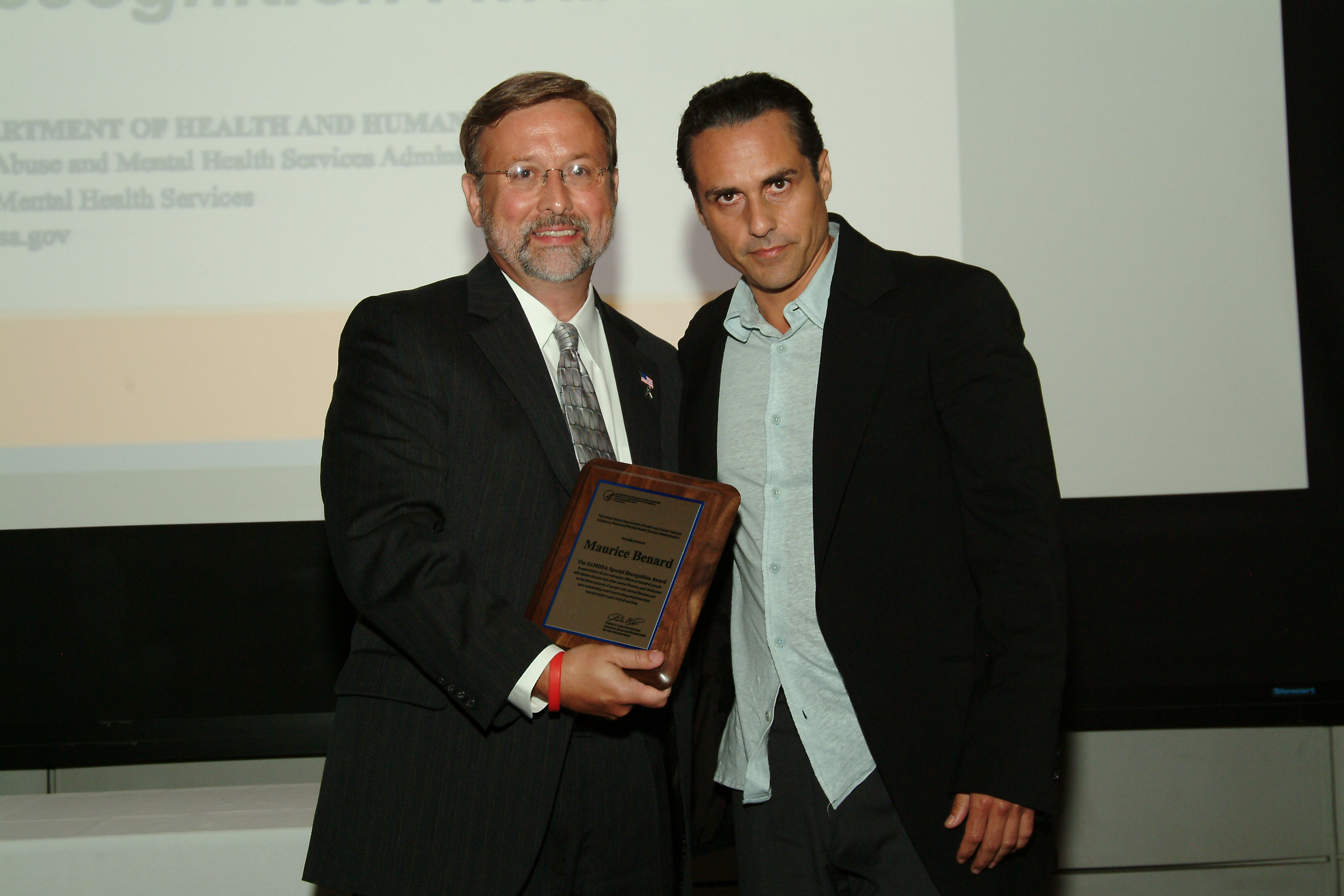
Maurice Benard is an actor who is well known for playing Sonny Corinthos on the ABC soap opera General Hospital.

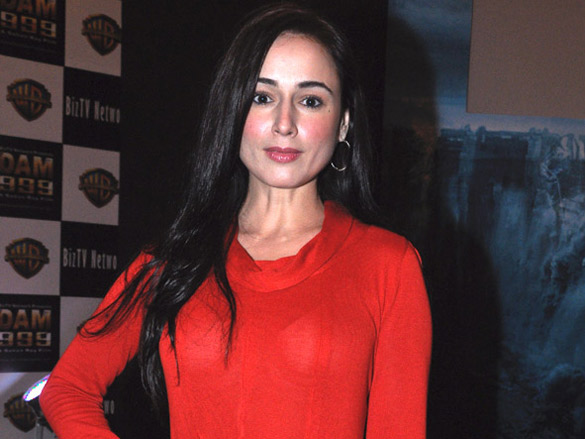
Linda Arsenio is an actress and model

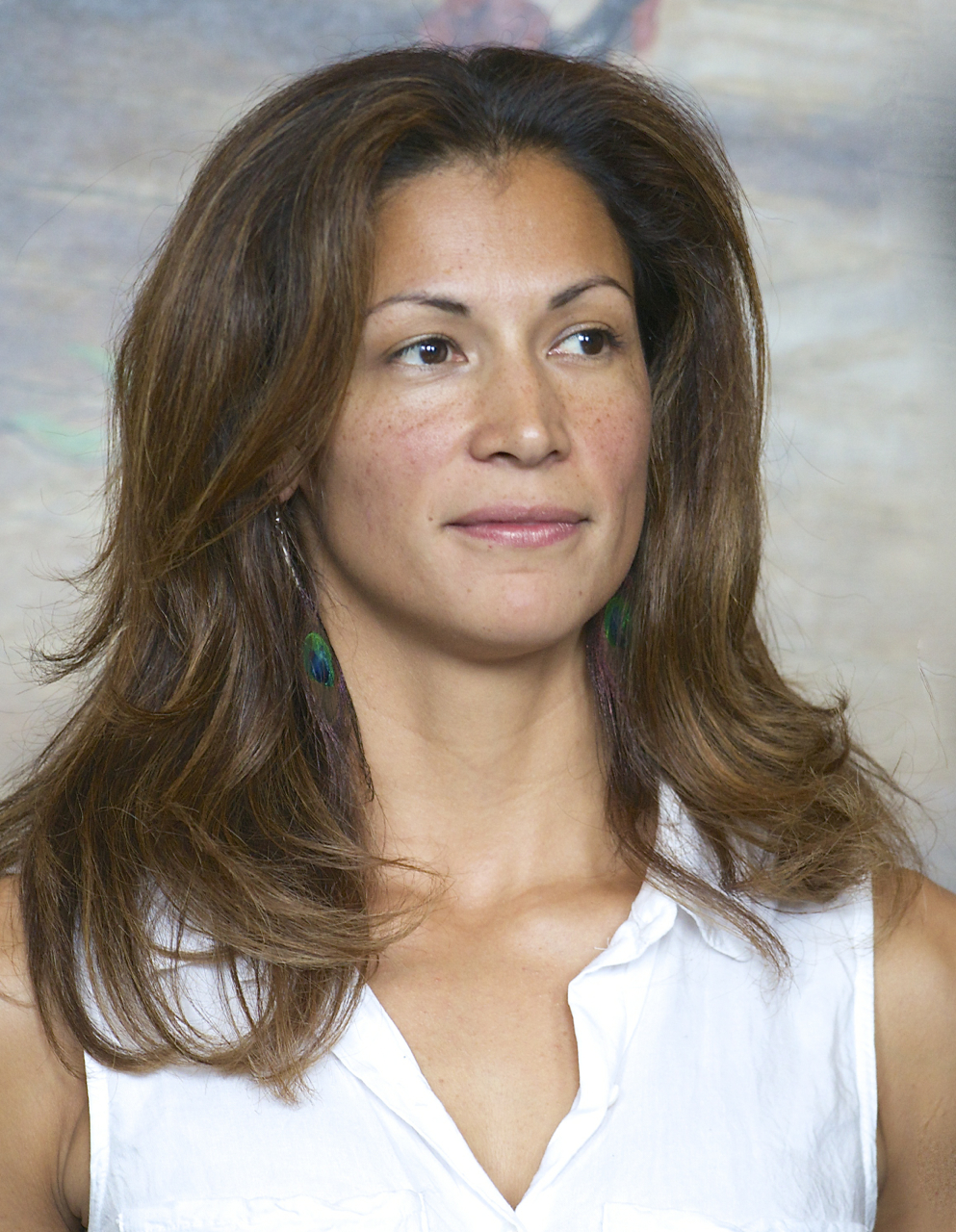
Malin Arvidsson is an actor and dancer

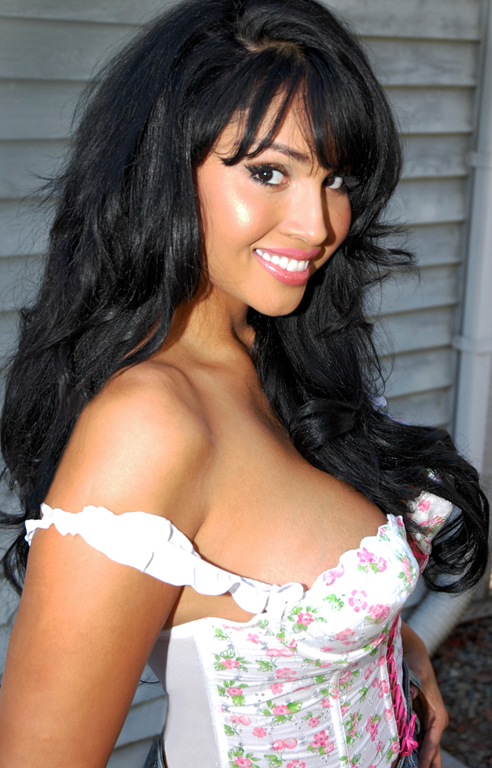
Somaya Reece is a Salvadoran American hip hop and reality TV star

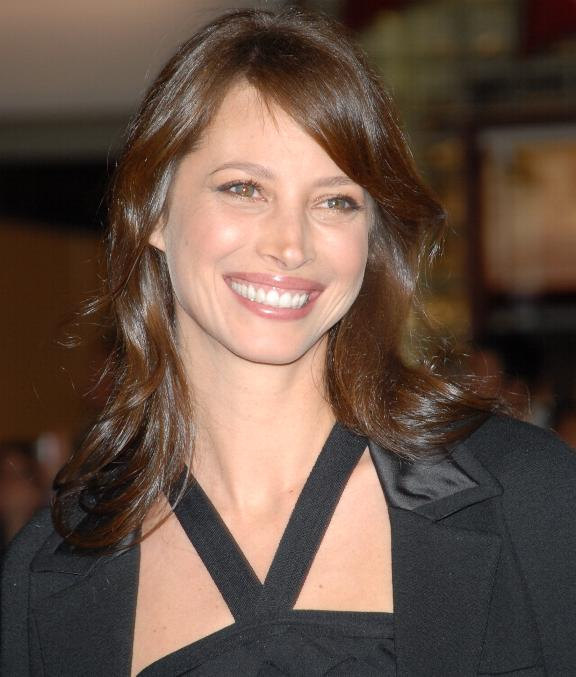
Christy Turlington is an American supermodel. Her mother is from El Salvador. She first represented Calvin Klein's Eternity campaign in 1989 and again in 2014 and also represents Maybelline.

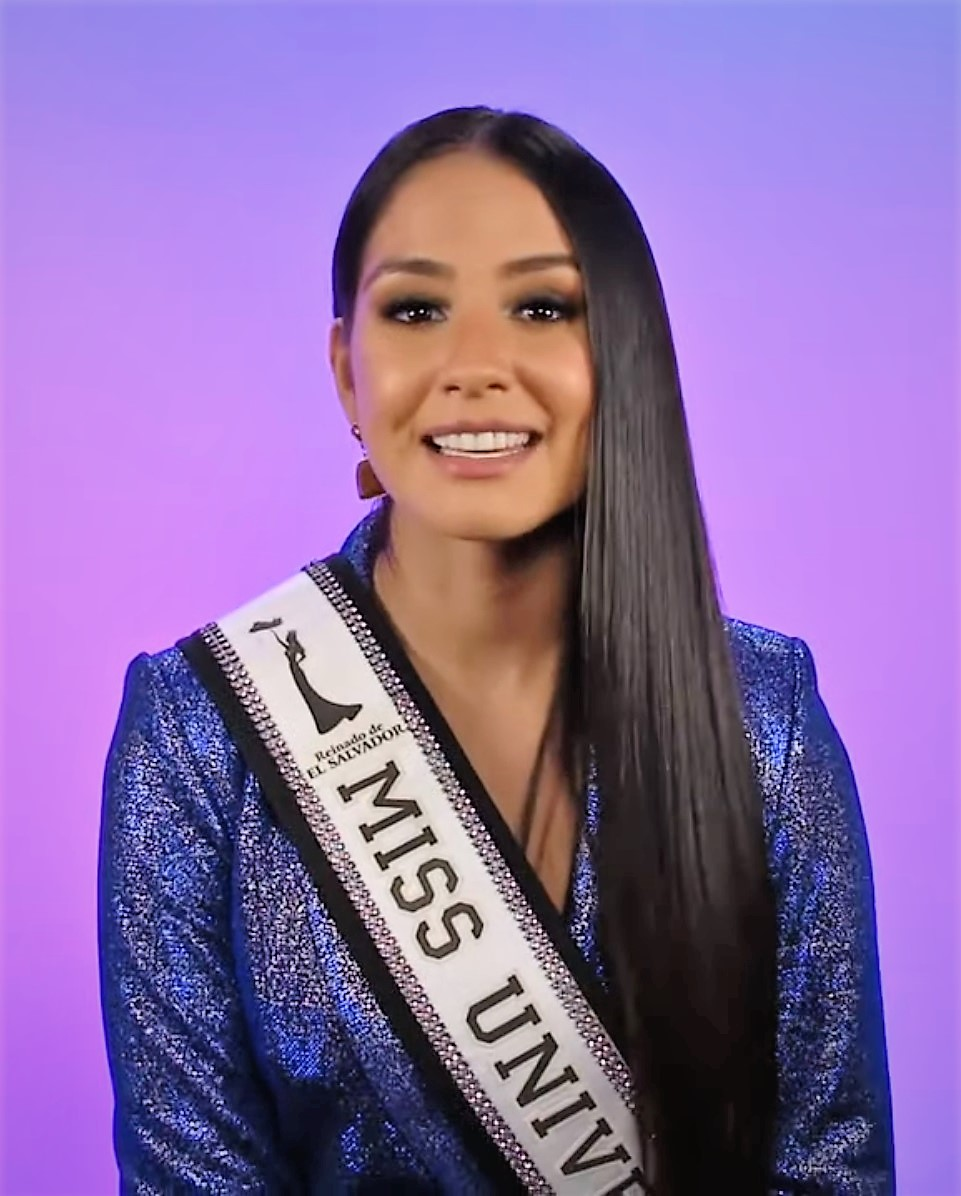
Zuleika Soler, model and beauty pageant titleholder

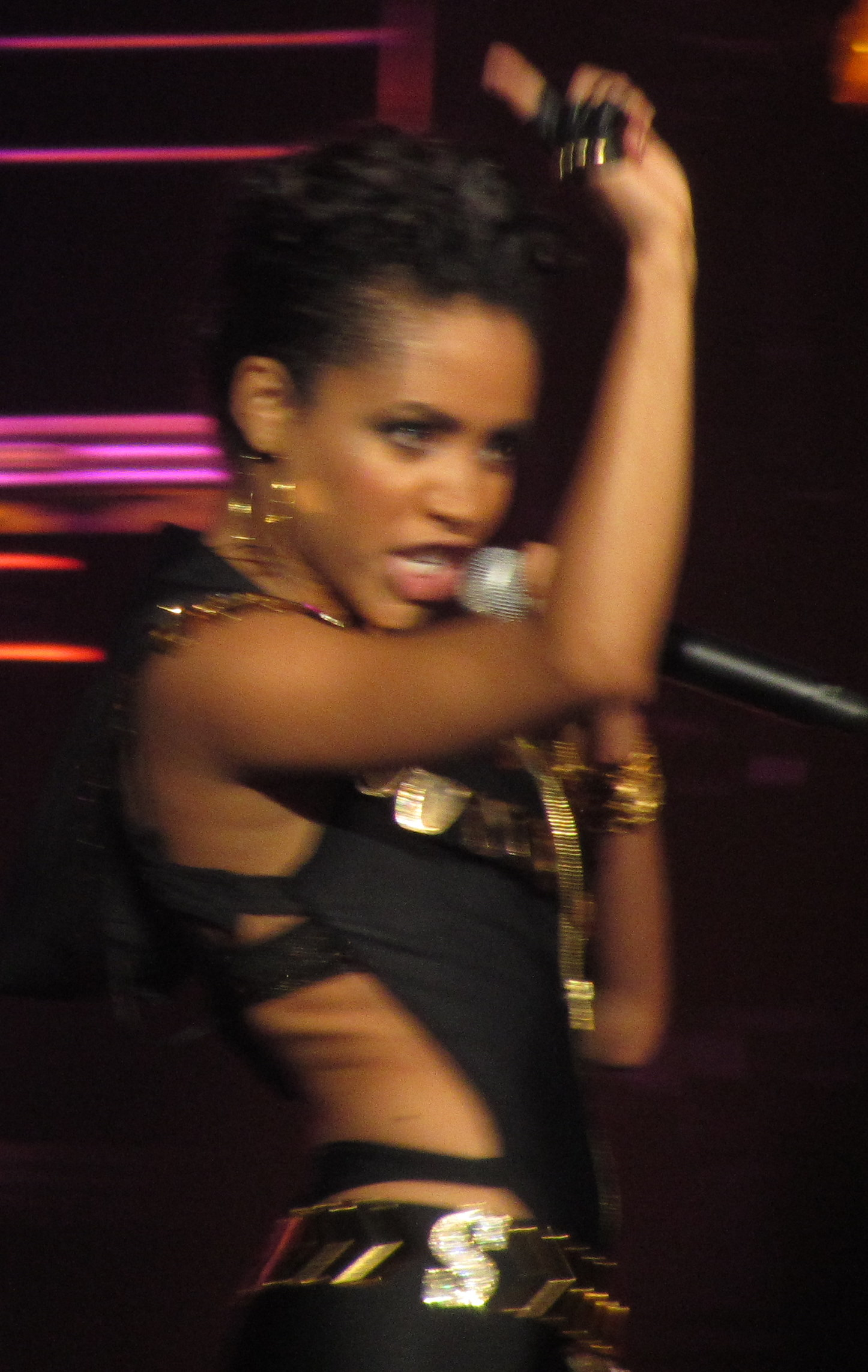
Sabi (American singer) is a Salvadoran-American pop singer, songwriter, dancer and actress from Los Angeles, California. She was formerly part of the hip hop girl group, The Bangz. She is currently signed to Warner Bros. Records.

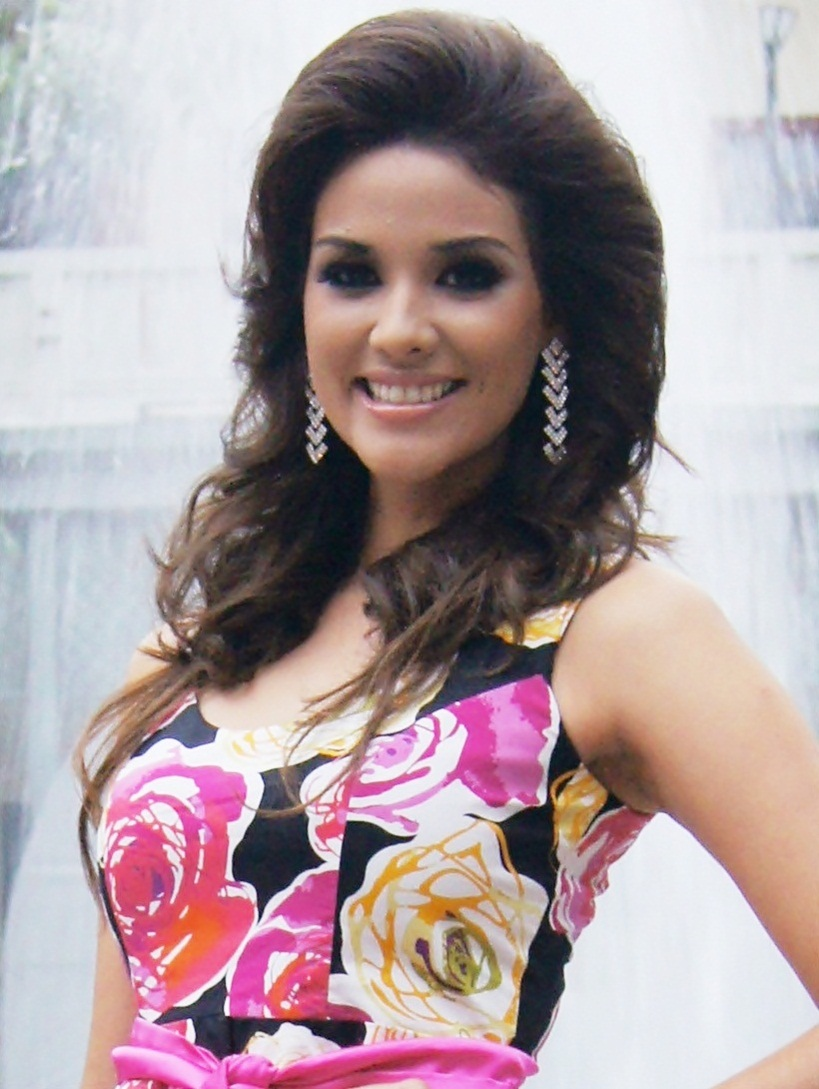
Ana Yancy Clavel is a Salvadorian beauty queen and TV personality

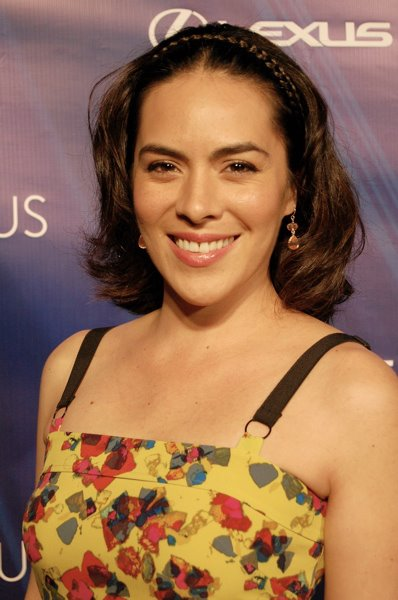
Carla Vila is a Salvadoran American actress

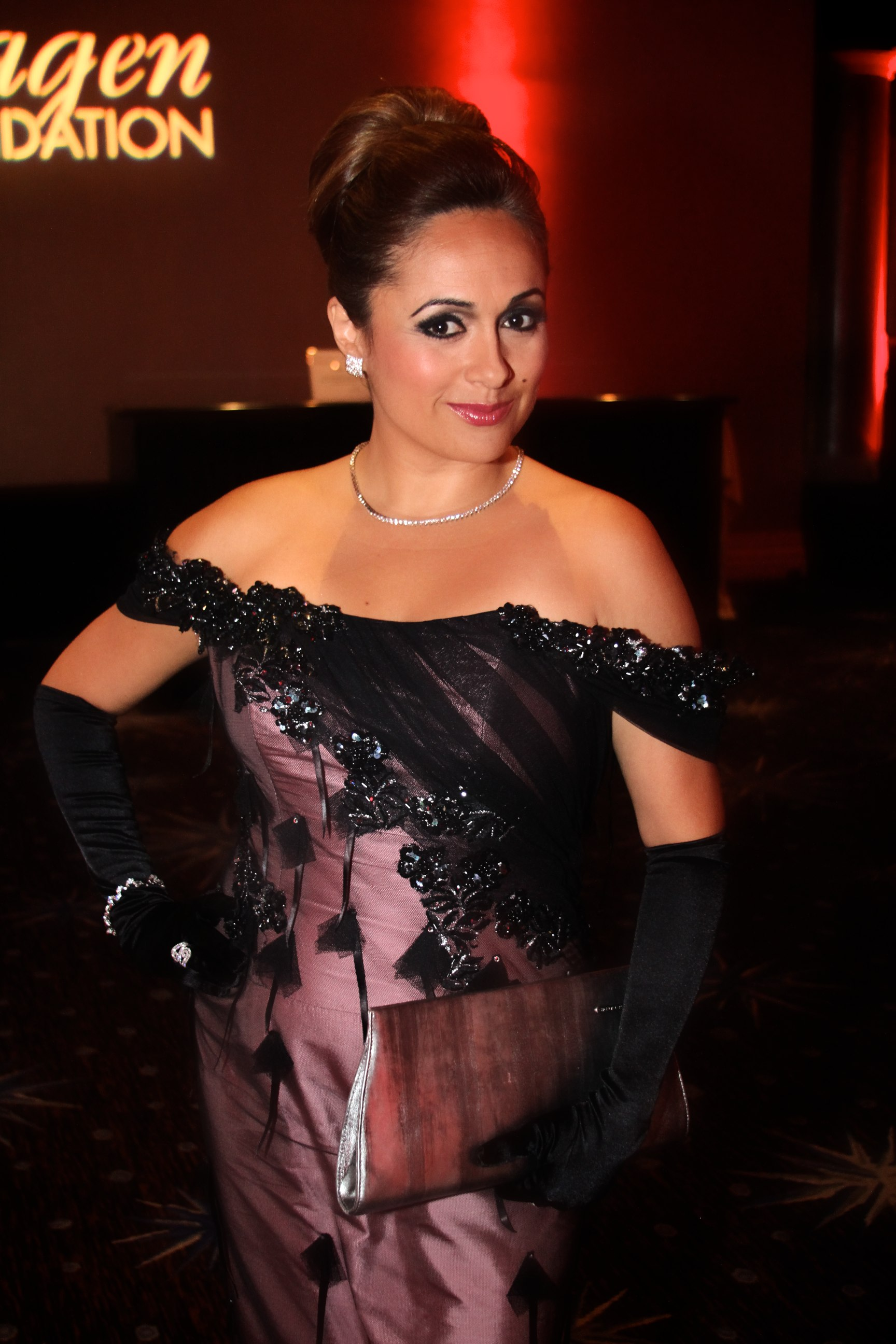
Elizabeth Espinosa reporter and journalist

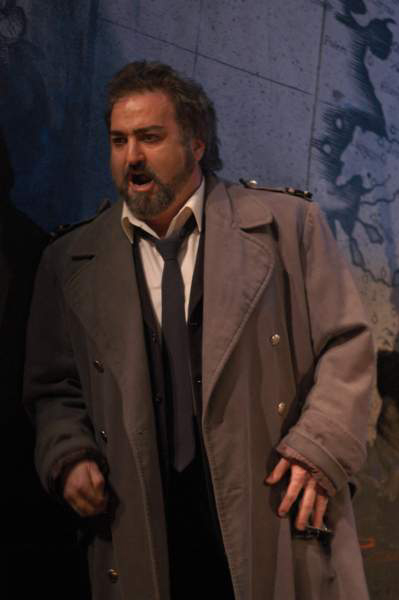
Fernando del Valle is an American operatic tenor.

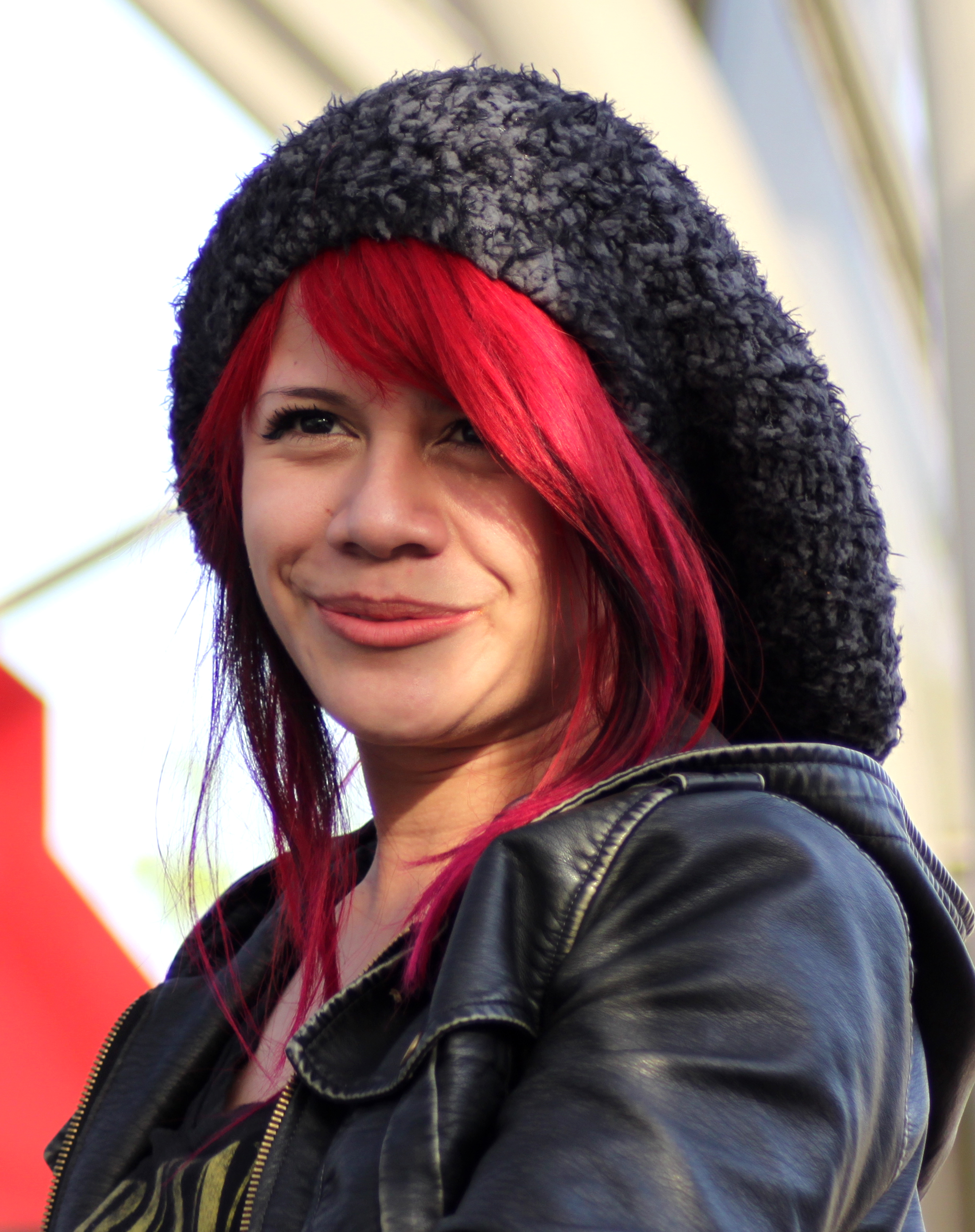
Allison Iraheta is an American singer from Los Angeles, California, who was the fourth place finalist on the eighth season of American Idol.

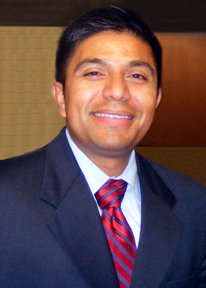
Victor R. Ramirez is the current state senator for District 47 in Prince George's County, Maryland

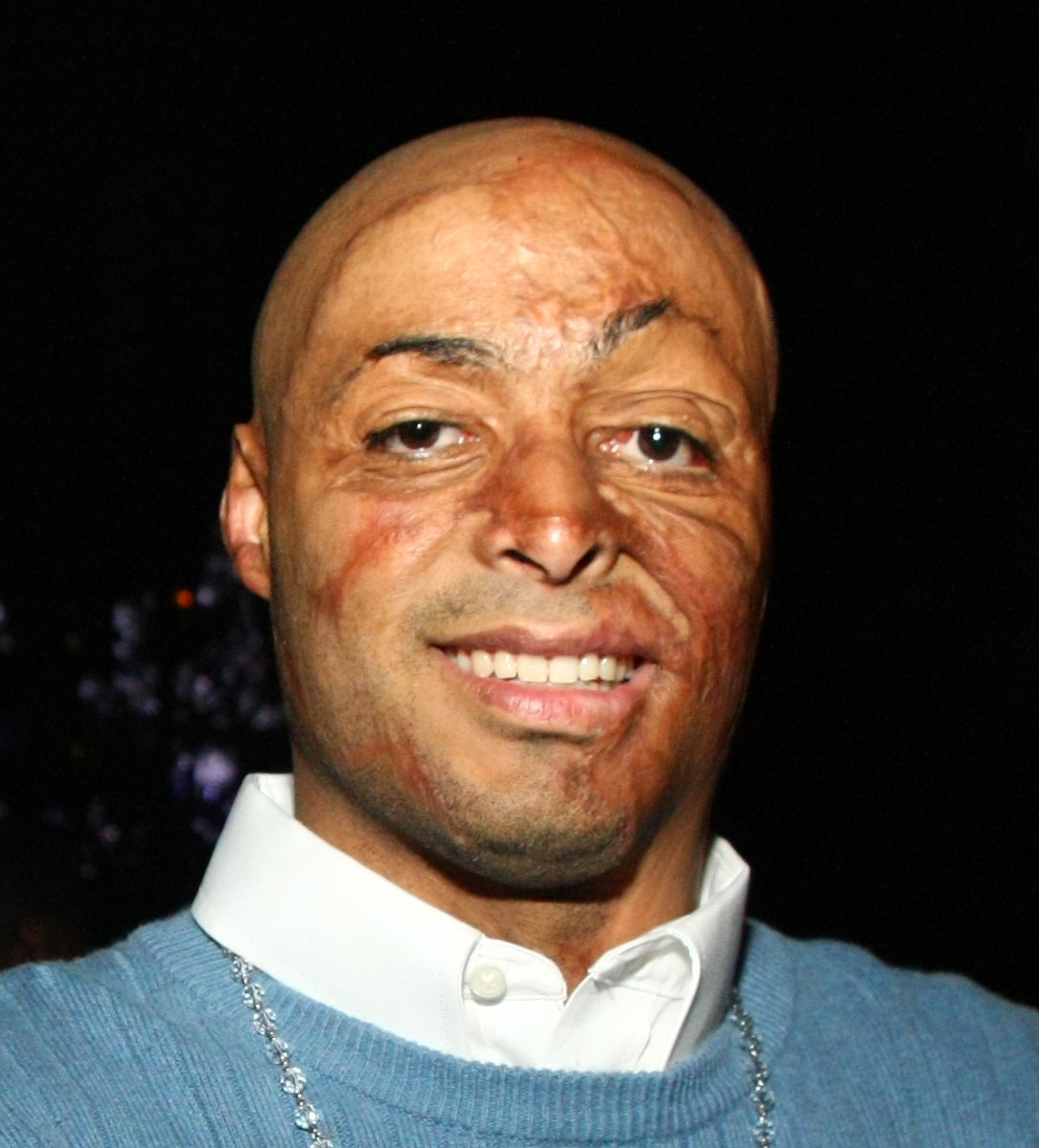
J. R. Martinez is an American actor, motivational speaker and former U.S. Army soldier. Starting in 2008, he played the role of Brot Monroe on the ABC daytime drama All My Children. He is the winner of Season 13 of ABC's Dancing with the Stars. Martinez served as the Grand Marshal of the 2012 Rose Parade. He is currently costarring on the syndicated action series SAF3.

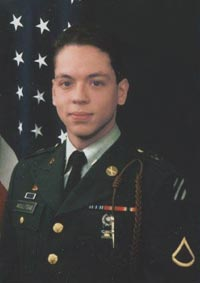
Markos Moulitsas is a Salvadoran American that served in the U.S. Army from 1989 through 1992. He is the founder and publisher of Daily Kos, a blog focusing on liberal and Democratic Party politics in the United States. He co-founded SB Nation, a collection of sports blogs, which is now a part of Vox Media

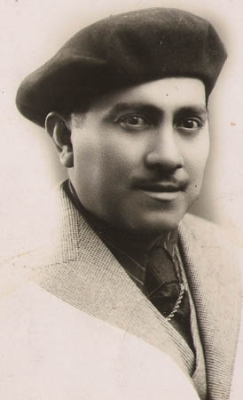
Carlos Irigoyen Ruiz was a renowned Salvadoran musician during the 1920s-1940s.

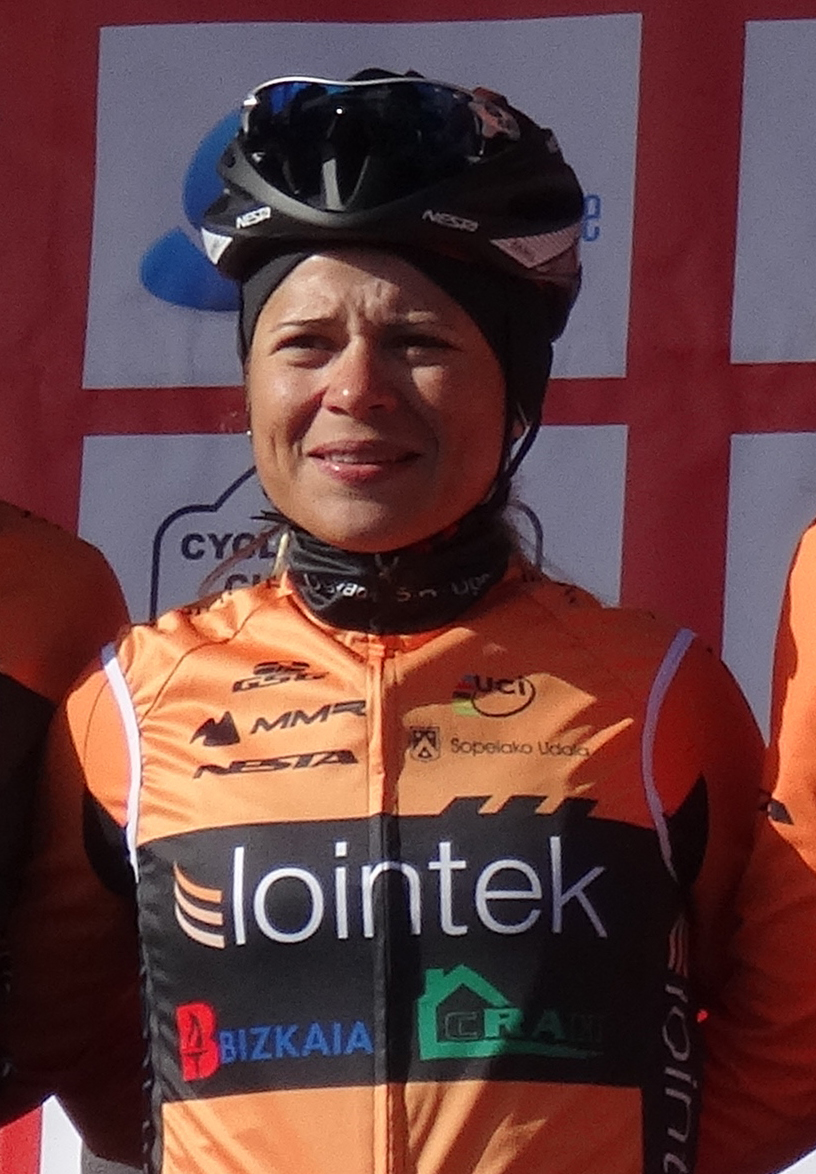
Evelyn García is a Salvadoran cycle racer who rides for the Fenixs team.

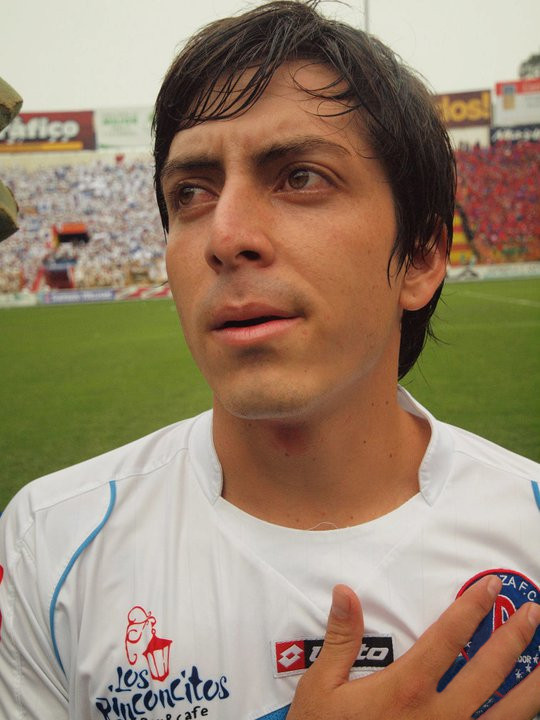
Herbert Sosa is a Salvadoran professional footballer.

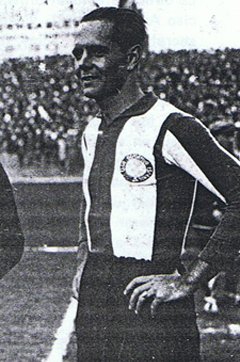
Ricardo Saprissa was a lifelong athlete, coach, and promoter of sports.

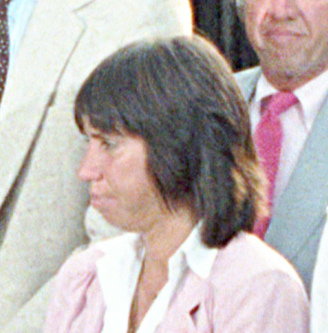
Rosemary Casals is a former American professional tennis player

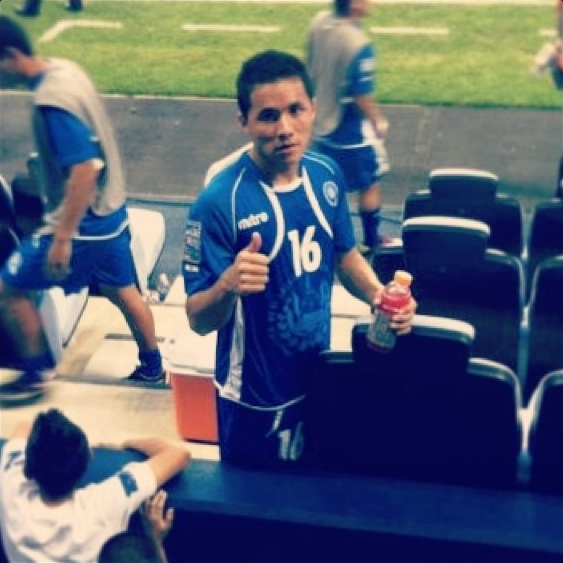
Richard Menjívar is a Salvadoran international footballer currently playing for the New York Cosmos of the North American Soccer League.

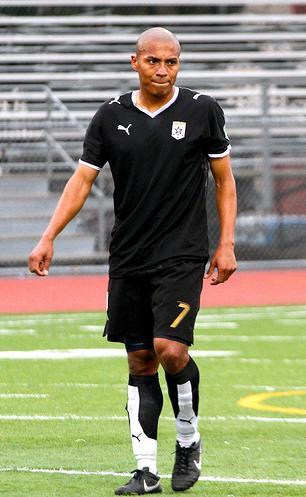
Edwin Miranda grew up in Los Angeles, California and played four years of college soccer at Cal State-Northridge, where he was twice named Big West Conference Defender of the Year.

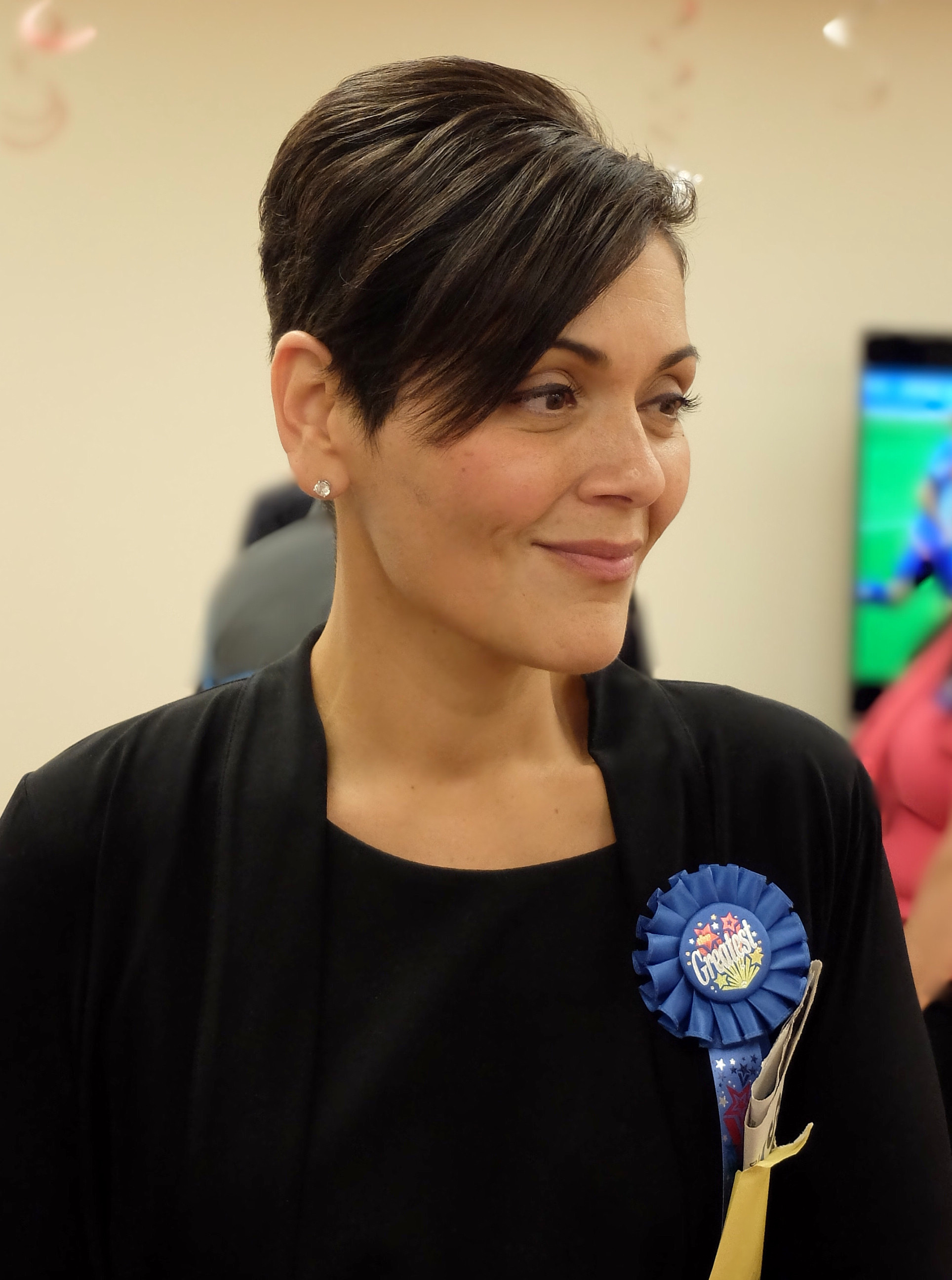
Hala Ayala is an cybersecurity specialist and democrat politician representing the 51st district in the Virginia House of Delegates.

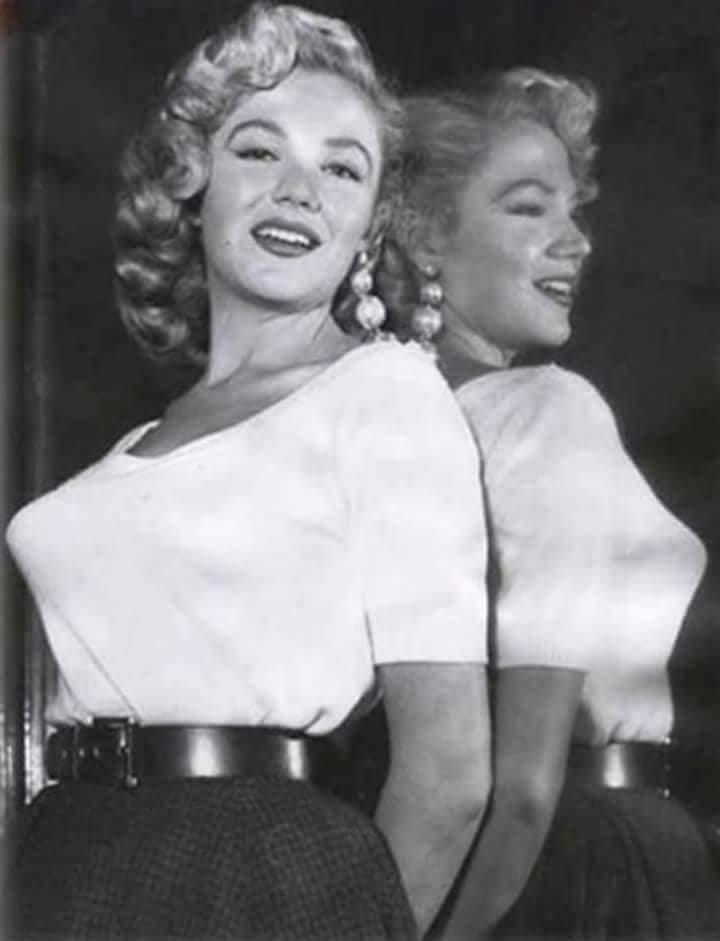
Maribel Arrieta Gálvez was a Salvadoran beauty queen where she represented her country at Miss Universe 1955. Arrieta met Baron Jacques Thuret (of Belgian/French nobility) and both were married in 1963, granting her the title "Baronesa de Thuret".

== See also ==
- Salvadoran Americans
- Salvadoran Mexicans
- List of Salvadorans
- Criollo people
- Afro-Salvadorans
