= Television in El Salvador =

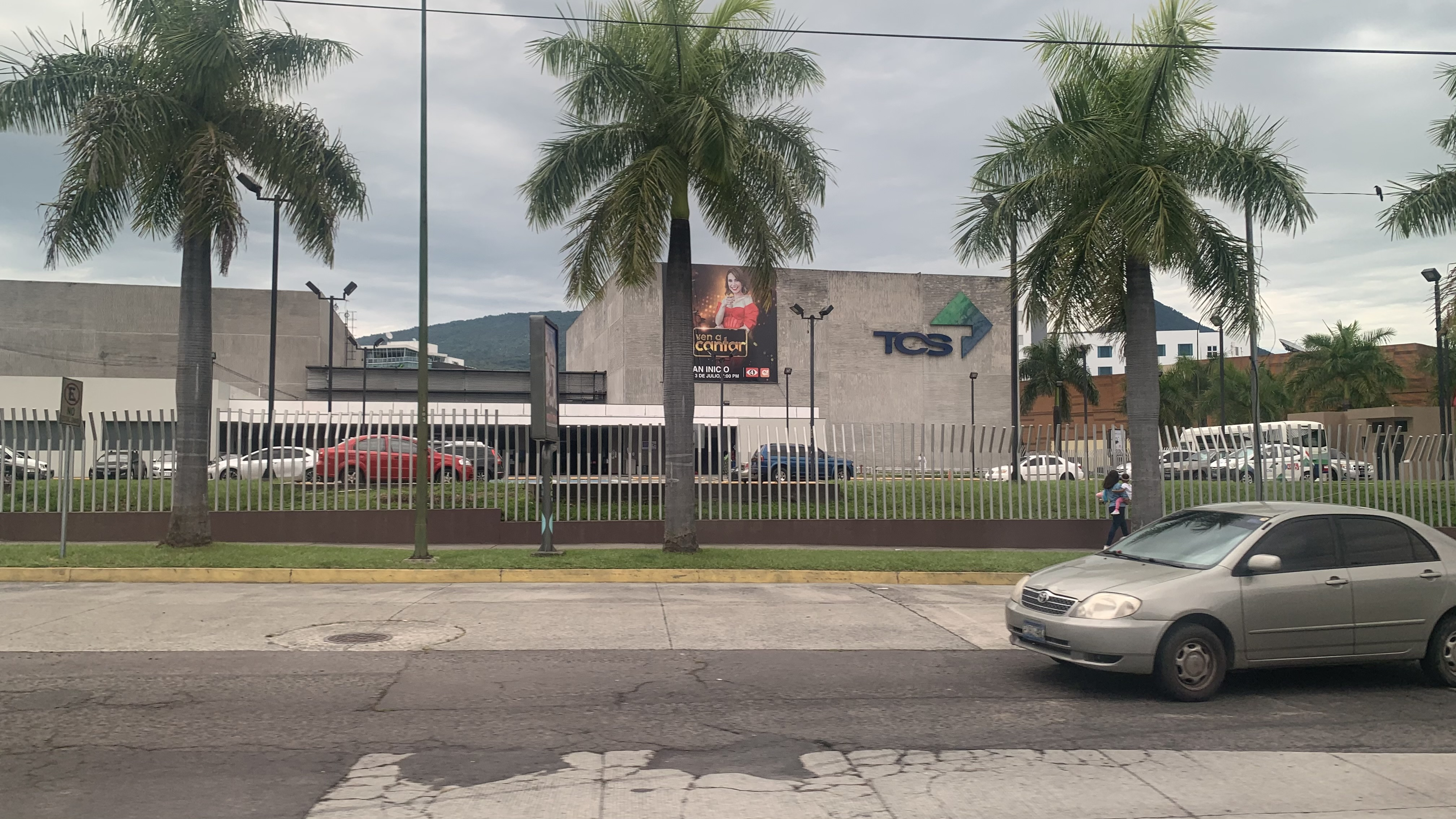
Headquarters for Telecorporación Salvadoreña in Antiguo Cuscatlán, El Salvador

Television in El Salvador began in 1956 in black and white on YSEB-TV, which would bring attention to the radio broadcasting industry in the 1960s. It was so much so that it was part of the Salvadoran Broadcasting Association (ASDER) in 1964 to confront stagnation, in response to the political crisis during the era of military authoritarianism. Since the birth of privatization, Salvadoran television survived with the support of viewers and the growth of the industry that became part of one of the most important media. Currently, there are 42 television channel concessions in total: 35 of these are private, five religious and two public. In addition, eighteen television channels have national coverage and 24 channels are regional; including international television services, normally distributed by cable and satellite. Salvadoran television is in charge of the General Superintendency of Electricity and Telecommunications (SIGET) since 1996, being the successor of the National Telecommunications Administration (ANTEL).

== History ==
The first attempts to create television were made by the Mexican Rubén González on his own initiative in April 1956. In the same month, Boris Eserski, Guillermo Pinto and Tono Alfaro, former owners of the YSEB radio station, collaborated in this creation. The first television channel launched was YSEB-TV, now known as Canal 6 was launched on 7 September 1956 as a public channel that lasted for ten years; Its programming was very short by transmitting for two hours, and it only covered the city of San Salvador; and later Canal 8 would share its signal from 1958 to 1963. Canal 4 began as the second public channel that lasted from 1959 to 1963, which turned into a private channel in 1966 and the first channel with national coverage; three channels were part of Telecentro, which was the first conglomerate company for more than one channel, until its dissolution in 1966.

Later, a successor to two former public stations was formed called Televisión Educativa de El Salvador (Canal 10) from 1964 to 1968, and would return transmitting with Canal 8 on 29 January 1973; which those two channels lasted until 1989 when Canal 8 went signed off, leaving Canal 10 the only public TV channel at the time. However, the first private Salvadoran television channel is Canal 2 which was launched in 1965 on the basis of the radio station Circuito YSR. And due to the stagnation of having only this channel and Canal 4, this amount lasted until Canal 6 was relaunched on 6 April 1973 as the third private channel and the first full-time color television channel using the NTSC-M format. Although three years before due to geographical reasons it was only transmitted in the western zone on the Guatemalan border, and Canal 4 began its transmissions as a part-time transmission in color from 3 March 1973 until the channel was completely adopted in the FIFA World Cup 1974. With this innovation in the television system, all television channels throughout the 1970s switched to color screens, especially Canal 6 which was revived in 1973 as a full-color channel.

Unitl 15 December 1984, El Salvador only had five television stations, when Canal 12 was born as a direct competitor of the three private channels, launching as the sixth station overall. By 1985, with the merger of channels 2, 4 and 6, Don Boris Eserski, one of the pioneers of Salvadoran television, founded Telecorporación Salvadoreña to facilitate its administration with the three concessions, and compete with other companies. On 1 March 1993, the third private media company called Grupo Megavisión was founded, with the launch of the UHF channel nationwide, Canal 21, and two years later Canal 19 was founded, both with the operational of Inversiones de Desarrollo Industrial y Agrícola (INDESI). These first two UHF channels paved the way for more television companies to take concessions from channels such as Canal 33, VTV (today TCS+) and regional channels of El Salvador; including the return of Canal 8 under the ownership of Asociación Agape de El Salvador in 2001.

Other ways of watching television in El Salvador came cable and via satellite due to technological advances and the adaptation of international television, which is why they are based on subscription. The first to arrive with ANTEL approval were Telesat and Futurama in 1986, and in the 1990s it grew with the extension of the UHF band concessions with Cablevisa, Multicable and Amnet, including foreign companies such as Tecavisa. It currently offers variable programming on thematic channels with hundreds of operators and providers such as Tigo Star, Claro TV, Movistar TV, Sky México and Universal Cable Apopa.

Entering the 21st Century, El Salvador was ready for digital television to be released, which initially adopted the ATSC Standards for the transmission of digital terrestrial television, but then in 2017 decided to adopt the international standard ISDB-T used in many other Latin American nations. The first digital television channel is Canal 10 on 21 December 2018, and it serves three channels in one; activity that other channels began the digital switchover, and it is expected that on 1 December 2024, El Salvador will only be broadcast in a digital signal.

== Salvadoran TV channels ==
In El Salvador, there are many religious television shows and many telenovelas. El Salvador is served by three national television corporations (TCS, RSM and Megavisión), two state-run channels (Canal 10 and Televisión Legislativa) and many minor and regional channels.
