= Willie Maldonado =

Salvadoran broadcaster

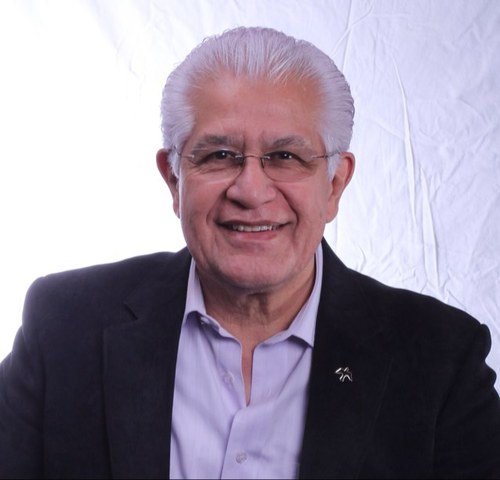
Portrait of Willie Maldonado

Guillermo Francisco "Willie" Maldonado Sandoval (born 1943) is a TV presenter in El Salvador, with over 66 years working in communications. He is the TV host with the longest history in El Salvador. Born in Guatemala City, he obtained his dedication as an entertainer, broadcaster and producer in radio-television-recording in El Salvador.

== Biography ==
At 12 years of age he was an operator at Radio Internacional in Guatemala. At 15, he became an announcer on Radio Cristal and by the time he was 20, he was a record producer and television presenter on Canal 3 (Guatemala).

== Career in Television ==
- 1963: First performance on TV (Channel 3, Guatemala). Subsequently, it presents a weekly offers show for a department store.
- February–July 1966: Co-hosts (alongside Leonardo Heredia -†15.08.17-) the daily program "Ritmo, Sabor y Fantasia" (TCS Canal 4, El Salvador).
- 1967: Host of "Disco Tints A go-go" (Canal 2, El Salvador).
- 1968: Hosts "Golazo Royal", with Guillermo Alberto Hernandez (†19.11.1971) on Canal 2 in El Salvador and Canal 5 in Honduras.
- 1971: Hosts "Telebingo Family" (Canal 2, El Salvador / Canal 2, Nicaragua)
- June 1971 - December 1972: Hosts "Juegue, Ría y Gane", a space that marks his consecration as a showman and host of family entertainment programs (Canal 2, El Salvador).
- September 1975 - February 1976: Produces and hosts "La Hora de Willie Maldonado", show that is suspended due to the earthquake of February 4 (Canal 3, Guatemala).
- June 1976 - July 1978: Produces and hosts Season I of "Fin de Semana", show that is canceled because of health problems (Canal 2, El Salvador).
- January–June 1978: Hosts "Lluvia de Estrellas" (Canal 2, Nicaragua)
- May 1981 - June 1982: Co-hosts (with Gina Lavandier) "Rincón Hogareño" (Canal 2, El Salvador / Canal 3, Guatemala).
- 10-11 December 1982: Participates as host, sound engineer and coordinator of talent in the first Telethon in El Salvador (transmitted by TCS from the Teatro Presidente).
- 1983: Hosts "El Gran Pensador" (Canal 11, Guatemala).
- 1986: Records several video segments in Spanish for "700 Club" (CBN, Virginia Beach).
- 1987, March 21: Start of production and hosting of the Season II of "Fin de Semana", this time on Canal 4, El Salvador.
- June 1990: Co-host of the international program "No me Preguntes a mí, Pregúntale a Dios" (recorded in CBN).
- September 1992: He was hired by Omar Marchant, Vice President of Telemundo to work on the channel. Three days before the debut, the project was frustrated because his personal belief to not render professional voice or image to promote cigarettes, beer or spirits (clause he had pointed out since the initial talks with the chain).
- January 31, 2003. Hosts with talents from TCS and Televisa the Telethon 2003, aired from the International Fair Amphitheater.
- January 30, 2004. Hosts with talents from TCS and Televisa the Telethon 2004, produced at the National Gymnasium "Adolfo Pineda".
- January 29, 2005. Hosts with Adal Ramones, Veronica Davila, Claudia Lizaldi and talents from TCS and Televisa the Telethon 2005, from the National Gymnasium "Adolfo Pineda".
- 28–29 January 2006. Hosts with Adal Ramones, Ernesto Laguardia and talents from TCS and Televisa the Telethon 2006, from the National Gymnasium "Adolfo Pineda".
- 2006, September 30: Ends hosting and production of "Fin de Semana" on Channel 4, El Salvador.
- 2006, October 7: Starts hosting and production of "Fin de Semana" on Channel 2, El Salvador.
- February 2, 2007. Hosts with Ernesto Laguardia and talents from TCS and Televisa the Telethon 2007 from the National Gymnasium "Adolfo Pineda".
- February 1, 2008. Hosts with Adal Ramones, Paty Manterola and talents from TCS and Televisa the Telethon 2008 from the National Gymnasium "Adolfo Pineda".
- 6–7 February 2009. Hosts with talents from TCS and Televisa, the Telethon 2009 from the National Gymnasium "Adolfo Pineda".
- 2009, December 26. Closes the Season II of "Fin de Semana" on Channel 2.
- February 6, 2010. Hosts with talents from TCS and Televisa the Telethon 2010 from the National Gymnasium "Adolfo Pineda".
- 2010, March 3-2014, December 31: Hosts the first season of "¿Quién quiere ser millonario?" on Canal 4.
- 2014, May 17. Hosts with Lucero, Adal Ramones and talents from TCS and Televisa the Telethon 2014 from the Foro 5 of TCS.
- 2016, February–April: Judge in "El Número 1 VIP" on Canal 2.
- 2018, October 27 - September 28, 2019: Host of "Con Willie" in TUTV Canal 11.
- 2019, October 5 - December 26, 2020: Host of "¡Gánale, tu puedes!" on Canal 8.

== Career in Radio / Shows ==
- November 1958: First chance at the microphone, TGC Radio Cristal in a Saturday afternoon shift.
- March 1959: He founded the program "Norteamérica al aire" in TGC, which becomes the youth segment's favorite radio show.
- September 2, 1961: Part of the founders of the first 100% youth-oriented Guatemalan radio: "Radio 9-80" with Jaime Paniagua (†December 10, 2000), Carlos Gamboa, Charlie DeLeon, Roberto Rodas (†Sep. 14, 2003), Rogelio Rivera, Osberto Morales (†September 23, 2011) and other talents.
- 1962-1964 Co-produced and hosts "La hora de Israel" alongside Jacobo Mendelsohn, Radio Panamericana, Guatemala.
- October 1965: Re-structure -along with other Guatemalan professionals as Carlos Barrios, Mario Hernández (†) and under the direction of Salvadoran Leonardo Heredia (†15.08.17)-, "Radio Emperador", Guatemala.
- February 1966: Becomes one of the founders of the first 100% Youth-oriented radio station in El Salvador: "La Femenina," along with L. Heredia (†15.08.17), Tito Carias (†Nov. 6.1973), Rolando Orellana and Carlos Meléndez.
- 1969: Begins his stage as commercial broadcaster.
- 1970: He retires as a DJ.
- 1971: Producer / Host of the radio show "Estelares" (YSU Radiocadena).
- 1975-1976: Correspondent in El Salvador for "Triunfos Musicales Latinoamericanos", show broadcast continentally by the Voice of America.
- August 10, 1979: Opens its "Grandes Viejas pero Buenas" ("Great Oldies but Goodies") radio show.
- March 1983 - June 1985: Producer / Host of the micro-show "Archivo 10.50" (YSU).
- April 24, 1999: Starts worldwide, on-line transmission of "Grandes Viejas pero Buenas"
- 2009, July 28 and August 18: Co-Host of the "Buenas Épocas" Concerts (Presidente Theater), to benefit Hogar V. Guarato.
- 2009, August 28: Hosts the "Grandes Viejas pero Buenas, 30 años" Concert (Presidente Theater), to benefit Hogar V. Guarato
- 2010, March 16: Hosts the "GVpB, Concert 2" (Presidente Theater), to benefit Hogar V. Guarato
- 2010, May 18: Hosts the "GVpB, Concert 3" (Presidente Theater), to benefit Hogar V. Guarato
- 2010, July 16: Hosts the "GVpB, Concert 4" (Presidente Theater), to benefit Hogar V. Guarato
- 2010, September 14: Hosts the "GVpB, Concert 5" (Presidente Theater), to benefit Hogar V. Guarato
- 2010, September–October: Dubs into Spanish the "Master Strategies" of Steven K. Scott.
- 2010, November 16: Hosts the "GVpB, Concert 6" (Presidente Theater), to benefit Hogar V. Guarato
- 2011, January 21: Hosts the "GVpB, Concert 7" (Presidente Theater), to benefit Hogar V. Guarato
- 2011, February 25: Hosts the "GVpB, Concert 8" (Presidente Theater), to benefit Hogar V. Guarato
- 2011, May 13: Hosts the "GVpB, Concert 9" (Presidente Theater), to benefit Hogar V. Guarato
- 2011, July 15: Hosts the "GVpB, Concert 10" (Presidente Theater), to benefit Hogar V. Guarato
- 2011, September 20: Hosts the "GVpB, Concert 11" (Presidente Theater), to benefit Hogar V. Guarato
- 2011, November 15: Hosts the "GVpB, Concert 12" (Presidente Theater), to benefit Hogar V. Guarato
- 2012, January 26: Hosts the "GVpB, Concert 13" (Presidente Theater), to benefit Hogar V. Guarato
- 2012, March 16: Hosts the "GVpB, Concert 14" (Presidente Theater), to benefit Hogar V. Guarato
- 2012, May 18: Hosts the "GVpB, Concert 15" (Presidente Theater), to benefit Hogar V. Guarato
- 2012, July 13: Hosts the "GVpB, Concert 16" (Presidente Theater), to benefit Hogar V. Guarato
- 2012, September 14: Hosts the "GVpB, Concert 17" (Presidente Theater), to benefit Hogar V. Guarato
- 2012, November 16: Hosts the "GVpB, Concert 18" (Presidente Theater), to benefit Hogar V. Guarato
- 2013, January 31: Hosts the "GVpB, Concert 19" (Presidente Theater), to benefit Hogar V. Guarato
- 2013, March 22: Hosts the "GVpB, Concert 20" (Presidente Theater), to benefit Hogar V. Guarato
- 2013, May 16: Hosts the "GVpB, Concert 21" (Presidente Theater), to benefit Hogar V. Guarato
- 2013, July 16: Hosts with Cilinia Bueno the 50th Celebration of the "Reverendo Juan Bueno" Christian Schools at "Mágico González" stadium
- 2013, July 19: Hosts the "GVpB, Concert 22" (Presidente Theater), to benefit Hogar V. Guarato
- 2013, September 13: Hosts the "GVpB, Concert 23" (Presidente Theater), to benefit Hogar V. Guarato
- 2014, March 13: Hosts the "GVpB, Concert 24" (Presidente Theater), to benefit Hogar V. Guarato
- 2014, July 4: Hosts the "GVpB, Concert 25" (Presidente Theater), to benefit Hogar V. Guarato
- 2014, September 20: Hosts the "GVpB, Concert 26" (Presidente Theater), to benefit Hogar V. Guarato
- 2014, November 12: Hosts the "GVpB, Concert 27" (Presidente Theater), to benefit Hogar V. Guarato
- 2014, November 25: Hosts the sixth award ceremony of the "Top Brand Award" of Universidad Tecnológica
- 2015, January 30: Hosts the "GVpB, Concert 28" (Presidente Theater), to benefit Hogar V. Guarato
- 2015, March 27: Hosts the "GVpB, Concert 29" (Presidente Theater), to benefit Hogar V. Guarato
- 2015, June 24: Hosts the "GVpB, Concert 30" (Presidente Theater), to benefit Hogar V. Guarato
- 2015, July 4 - February 29, 2020: Presents his radio production "The afternoon flies".
- 2015, August 21: Hosts the "GVpB, Concert 31" (Presidente Theater), to benefit Hogar V. Guarato
- 2015, October 30: Hosts the "GVpB, Concert 32" (Presidente Theater), to benefit Hogar V. Guarato
- 2015, November 24: Hosts the seventh award ceremony of the "Top Brand Award" of Universidad Tecnológica
- 2016, January 30: Hosts the "GVpB, Concert 33" (Presidente Theater), to benefit Hogar V. Guarato
- 2016, April 1: Hosts the "GVpB, Concert 34" (Presidente Theater), to benefit Hogar V. Guarato
- 2016, June 30: Hosts the "GVpB, Concert 35" (Presidente Theater), to benefit Hogar V. Guarato
- 2016, August 31: Hosts the "GVpB, Concert 36" (Presidente Theater), to benefit Hogar V. Guarato
- 2016, November 25: Hosts the "GVpB, Concert 37" (Presidente Theater), to benefit Hogar V. Guarato
- 2017, January 28: Hosts the "GVpB, Concert 38" (Presidente Theater), to benefit Hogar V. Guarato
- 2017, march 18: Hosts the "GVpB, Concert 39" (Presidente Theater), to benefit Hogar V. Guarato
- 2017, march 18: Hosts the "GVpB, Concert 39" (Presidente Theater), to benefit Hogar V. Guarato
- 2017, June 30: Hosts the "GVpB, Concert 40" (Presidente Theater), to benefit Hogar V. Guarato
- 2017, October 30 to July 27, 2018: Presents "The W. Maldonado´s show", broadcast live from San Salvador to Radio América 900 for the metropolitan area of Washington, D.C.
- 2018, January 27: Hosts the "GVpB, Concert 41" (Presidente Theater), to benefit Hogar V. Guarato
- 2021, June 14: Starts -with Hernán Sánchez Barros- a new radio production: "We have to talk" in Radio Laser 92.9

== Record production ==
- 1963: Records "La Aplanadora" with the group "Los Traviesos", using the transmission equipment of Radio Panamericana. Weeks later, released his first 45 RPM single (pressed in Miami) with the same song.
- 1964: He founded the label "PICARO", producing groups from Guatemala, Mexico and El Salvador.
- 1966: Launches -alongside Leonardo Heredia (†15.08.17)- "Central de Grabaciones" .
- 1967: Records with Leonardo (†15.08.17) the instrumental version of the National Anthem of El Salvador, played by the Band of the Armed Forces. Location: Regis Theater.
- 1969: Records the version of "Pajaro Picón" dedicated to the El Salvador's national soccer team, used for many years to celebrate goals. Lyrics and voice talent by the great comedian "Pánfilo a puras cachas" Mauricio Bojórquez (†25.01.17).
- 1971: He founded the musical group Fiebre Amarilla.
- 1974: Founds Estudios Doble V
- 1979: Transforms PICARO Records into DOBLE V Records.
- 1966-1983: Produces dozens of artists during the "Golden Age" of the Salvadoran artists.
- 1998: Releases on CD -along with the U.S. label "Music Art"- some of his productions, like "Super Ensalada" (Fiebre Amarilla), "Super Ensalada 2" (Vía Láctea), "Unidad" (Banda del Sol, Corimbo, etc.) "A Mi Manera" (Eduardo Fuentes) and "Mi Propio yo" (Pablo Rios†)
- 1999: Releases on CD Volume 1 of "Grandes Viejas Pero Buenas", containing tracks recorded in the period of 1966–1983, with such artists like Los Intocables, Los Mustangs, Los Lovers, Banda del sol, Fiebre Amarilla, Los Kiriaps, Los S.O.S., Los Genios, Oscar Olano, etc.
- 2000: Assigned by The European Union to produce a CD containing Salvadoran and international songs as part of the Festival "La Huella de Europa-El Salvador 2000". Artist: Marimba Tazumal.
- 2000: Releases on CD Volumes 2 and 3 of "Grandes Viejas Pero Buenas," with more classic themes from the years 1965 to 1983.
- 2001: Produces "Dos voces....un sentimiento" starring Angelita Kriete-Baldocchi and Roberto Romero Pineda, to benefit the victims of that year 's earthquakes.
- 2003: Produces the album "My Own Way" by Jimmy SAKS, to help disadvantaged children at the Hospital Bloom.
- 2005 Mixed -together with David Cabezas- the commemorative album of the 1st. "Festival of the Song", including songs by Arquímedes Reyes and Mónica Argueta and produces "My Own way 2", new CD by Jimmy SAKS.
- 2008: Produces and mixing -together with engineer David Cabezas- the debut CD of Johnny Sordo, Miami.
- 2009: Oversees the recording and mixing of "Canto al salvadoreño" with the "Internacional Orquesta Hnos. Flores".

== Special Acknowledgments ==
- May 4, 2005: Award "Our Stars" to the trajectory, given by elsalvador.com and El Diario de Hoy.
- December 7, 2006: Golden Microphone award from the Chamber of Professional Announcers Guatemala.
- August 17, 2008: CIBN International Award, Category Arts & Entertainment, awarded by Community Impacting Business Network.
- March 1, 2012: Secretariat of the Presidency of El Salvador (Trajectory and contribution to the Broadcasting)
- July 24, 2015: Alberto Masferrer University awarded him the title of Dr. Honoris Causa in Communicology
- February 23, 2016: The Rotary Club Maquilishuat gives him the "Galardón al Orgullo Salvadoreño" (Award for the Salvadorean Pride).
- October 22, 2016: The University Andres Bello gives him the "Communicator of the Year" Award
- November 18, 2017: The University Don Bosco gives him the "Communicator with outstanding career" Award
- November 9, 2018: The University Pedagógica gives him the "Maestre Integral" Award
- December 12, 2018: The Chamber of professional announcers of El Salvador awards him recognition as "Radio and TV Personality"

== Written Media ==
Founder-editor of the artistic and musical section "Con Permiso"

- February 1967 - July 1969: Diario El Mundo, articles.
- January 1970 - May 1972: Diario Latino, full page.
- June 1972-April 1975: Diario El Mundo, eight-page supplement.
