= Viva la Mañana =

- Also known as: Long Live the Morning
- Genre: Talk show
- Presented by: Mario Sibrián, Larissa Vega, Henry Urbina, Alejandra Retana y Ana Cortéz¨.
- Country of origin: El Salvador
- Original language: Spanish

Production
- Running time: 3 hours per episode

Original release
- Network: Canal 2
- Release: 18 July 2004 – present

Viva la Mañana (Long Live the Morning) is a Spanish-language morning talk show, that is transmitted through channels 2 and 4 on the Salvadoran television network Telecorporación Salvadoreña (TCS). The program is transmitted Monday through Friday from 8:00 a.m. to 11:00 a.m. Hosted by Mario Sibrian, Luciana Sandoval, Andrea Mariona, Alejandra and Gerardo Parker.

== History ==
The program was first broadcast on July 18, 2004. Viva la Mañana was created as part of a plan of expansion in the national production area of Telecorporación Salvadoreña.
