= Canal 33 =

Canal 33 may refer to:

- El 33, a TV channel in Catalonia
- Canal 33 (Salvadoran TV channel)
