= TCS+ =

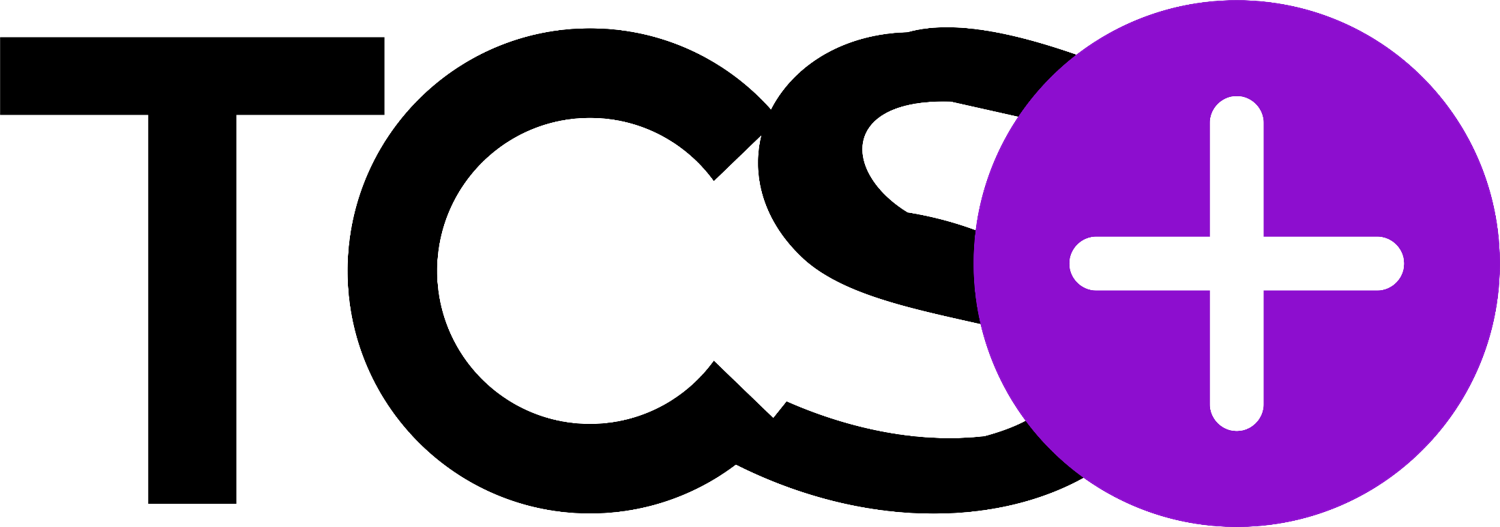
- Country: El Salvador
- Headquarters: Alameda Dr. Manuel Araujo Km. 6½ San Salvador

Programming
- Language: Spanish
- Picture format: 1080i HDTV (downscaled to 480i for the SDTV feed)

Ownership
- Owner: Telecorporación Salvadoreña
- Sister channels: Canal 2 Canal 4 Canal 6

History
- Launched: September 2003; 22 years ago
- Closed: = 15 December 2025; 3 months ago
- Former names: VTV (2003–2017)

Links
- Website: TCSGO.com

Availability

Terrestrial
- Analog UHF (El Salvador): Channel 35

Streaming media
- TCS GO: TCS GO

SV+ (styled SV+ Plus) is the fourth channel of Telecorporacion Salvadoreña. It broadcast on UHF channel 35 and on channel 5 on cable systems. Since December 15, 2025, the channel broadcasts national programs from TCS's three larger channels.

== History ==
The UHF frequency (channel 35) started broadcasting experimental signals in 1997, with the proliferation of television stations on the band. In 2000, TCS president Juan Carlos Eserski became involved and decided to create a pilot service consisting of music videos. The channel, still, had no defined profile.

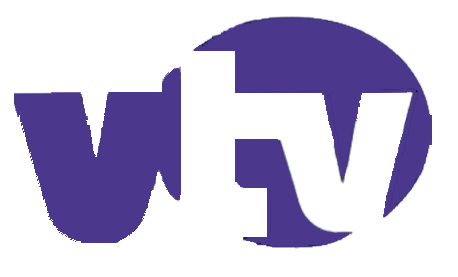
Logo used as VTV

The VTV brand was first used in September 2003, when it started regular pilot service. The channel's first director was Charlie Renderos and the bulk of its programming was sourced from two Spanish-speaking television giants, Univisión and Venevisión. Unlike the three VHF TCS channels (2, 4 and 6), the channel broadcast on a 24-hour basis and targeted a young adult audience.

By 2016, VTV started airing more in-house programming. On September 19, 2016, it premiered En Vivo con Maggie y Ana Pao, a gossip program.

On September 25, 2017, VTV was renamed TCS+.

On August 6, 2021, TCS+ aired an episode of Ben 10: Omniverse whose Latin Spanish dub was considered lost. The episode was banned by Cartoon Network in Latin America and Brazil due to stereotyped jokes related to Mexican culture. The banned episode aired on Canal 5 in Mexico according to eyewitness accounts.

On December 15, 2025, without prior warning, TCS+ was renamed SV+ (styled SV+ Plus) and changed its programming to feature only local programming seen on channels 2, 4 and 6.
