= El Número Uno (Salvadoran TV series) =

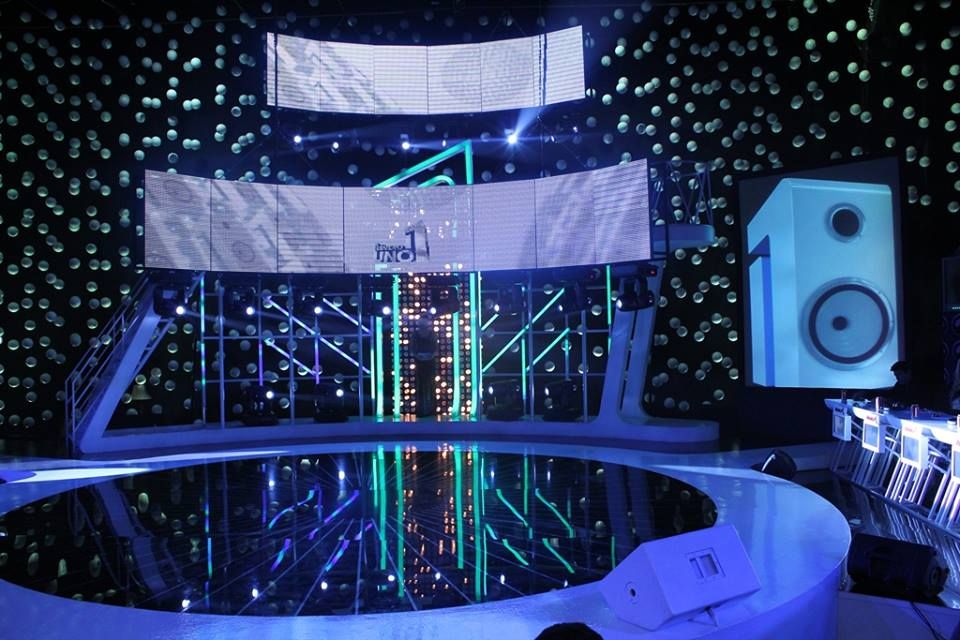
- The stage of El Número Uno
- Genre: Talent show
- Created by: Gestmusic Endemol; Antena 3
- Directed by: Raúl Domínguez; Eduardo Hütt
- Presented by: Mónica Casamiquela
- Judges: Current; Gerardo Parker; Juan Manuel Bolaños; Rocío Cáceres; Marinella Arrué; Rafael Alfaro; Former; Pamela Robin; Arquímedes Reyes; Lucía Parker; Álvaro Torres; Jhosse Lara; Andrea Cardenal; Alex Oviedo
- Country of origin: El Salvador
- Original language: Spanish
- No. of seasons: 2
- No. of episodes: 28

Production
- Running time: 120 minutes

Original release
- Network: TCS Canal 2
- Release: September 15, 2013 – December 7, 2014

El Número Uno ("The number one") is a Salvadoran television show based on the Spanish format of the same name created by Gestmusic Endemol and Antena 3. It airs on Telecorporación Salvadoreña's Canal 2, and is hosted by Mónica Casamiquela.

== History ==
In early 2013, it was confirmed that Telecorporación Salvadoreña had acquired the rights to adapt El Número Uno, the Spanish format created by Antena 3 and later purchased by Endemol, in El Salvador, becoming the first country in Latin America to have its own version of the show. The start of the production was officially confirmed in a press conference in July 2013.

== Production ==
El Número Uno became the most ambitious project in the history of TCS, and to produce it a new studio, known as "Foro 5", was built and added to the television complex of TCS. The first season started on September 15, 2013, on TCS' Canal 2.

== Season 1 (2013) ==
The first season ran from September 15 to December 8, 2013, and featured a panel of judges composed of Álvaro Torres, Gerardo Parker, Pamela Robin, Arquímedes Reyes and Lucía Parker.

=== List of contestants ===
Name	Birthplace	Final rank
Jonathan Castro	Santa Ana, Santa Ana	1st
Thoshi	San Marcos, San Salvador	2nd
Jafet Jerez	Planes de Renderos, San Salvador	3rd
Gabby Chacón	Santa Tecla, La Libertad	4th
Paty Menéndez	San Salvador, San Salvador	5th
Alex Hernández	San Salvador, San Salvador	6th
Nadia Maltez	Ayutuxtepeque, San Salvador	7th
Danny Bonilla	Metapán, Santa Ana	8th
Wiino Francia	Santa Tecla, La Libertad	9th
Gaby Tobar	San Salvador, San Salvador	10th
Juan Carlos Alas	Santa Tecla, La Libertad	11th
José Rivas	Santa Ana, Santa Ana	12th
Javier Mondragón	San Salvador, San Salvador	13th
Óscar Chacón	Santa Tecla, La Libertad	14th
Nathalia Bustamante	San Salvador, San Salvador	15th
Alejandro López	San Vicente, San Vicente	16th

=== Weekly stats chart ===
Contestant	Week 1	Week 2		Week 3		Week 4		Week 5		Week 6		Week 7		Week 8		Week 9		Week 10		Week 11		Week 12		Finale
Jonathan	In	Armored		Duel	Saved	Armored		Armored		Saved		Armored		Armored		Duel	Saved	Saved		Saved		Saved		Winner
Thoshi	In	Armored		Armored		Saved		Armored		Saved		Armored		Armored		Saved		Saved		Saved		Saved		Runner-up
Jafet	In	Armored		Armored		Armored		Armored		Armored		Armored		Armored		Armored		Duel	Saved	Armored		Duel	Saved	3rd
Gabby	In	Armored		Armored		Armored		Armored		Duel	Saved	Duel	Saved	Saved		Saved		Armored		Armored		Armored		4th
Paty	In	Armored		Armored		Armored		Armored		Armored		Armored		Duel	Saved	Saved		Armored		Duel	Saved	Duel	Out	
Alex	In	Armored		Armored		Armored		Armored		Saved		Armored		Saved		Saved		Saved		Duel	Out			
Nadia	In	Saved		Armored		Duel	Saved	Duel	Saved	Saved		Armored		Saved		Armored		Duel	Out					
Danny	In	Armored		Armored		Armored		Armored		Armored		Armored		Armored		Duel	Out							
Wiino	In	Armored		Armored		Armored		Saved		Saved		Saved		Duel	Out									
Gaby	In	Saved		Armored		Armored		Saved		Armored		Duel	Out											
J. Carlos	In	Saved		Saved		Armored		Saved		Duel	Out													
José	In	Armored		Saved		Duel	Saved	Duel	Out															
Mondra	In	Armored		Armored		Duel	Out																	
Oscar	In	Duel	Saved	Duel	Out																			
Nathalia	In	Duel	Out																					
Alejandro	In	Duel	Out																					
Yanci	Out																							
Javi	Out																							
César	Out																							
Alberto	Out																							
Mónica	Out																							
Diana	Out																							
Carol	Out																							
Mateo	Out																							
María E.	Out																							
Carlos	Out																							

KEY:

- The contestant had already been eliminated
- The contestant was selected for the Duel
- The contestant took part in the Duel and was eliminated by the judges
- The contestant took part in the Duel and was saved by the judges
- The contestant was eliminated in week 1 after not being selected by any judge
- The contestant was picked directly from his group to qualify for the competition
- The contestant was selected by the judges to qualify for the competition
- The contestant was selected by the viewers' votes to qualify for the competition
- The contestant won the weekly challenge and became automatically armored or was the first to be armored by any of the judges
- The contestant was armored by the judges
- The contestant was saved by the viewers' votes

== Season 2 (2014) ==
The second season ran from September 7 to November 30, 2014. None of the judges from season 1 returned to the show, and the new panel featured Jhosse Lora, Andrea Cardenal, Alex Oviedo, Marinella Arrué and Rafael Oviedo.

=== List of contestants ===
Name	Birthplace	Final rank
Mauricio Anaya	San Salvador, San Salvador	1st
Kennya Padrón	Santa Tecla, La Libertad	2nd
Florence Umaña	Santa Tecla, La Libertad	3rd
Elías Hasbún	San Salvador, San Salvador	4th
Benjamín López	San Salvador, San Salvador	5th
Dennis Soriano	San Salvador, San Salvador	6th
Michelle Umaña	Santa Tecla, La Libertad	7th
Javi Jiménez	San Salvador, San Salvador	8th
Rocío Martí	San Salvador, San Salvador	9th
Marito Ortíz	Santa Ana, Santa Ana	10th
Beatriz Garzona	Santa Tecla, La Libertad	11th
Henry Mejía	Santa Tecla, La Libertad	12th
Danny Méndez	Ayutuxtepeque, San Salvador	13th
Laura Villalta	San Salvador, San Salvador	14th
Abner Hernández	San Salvador, San Salvador	15th
Gaby Ramos	San Salvador, San Salvador	16th

=== Weekly stats chart ===
Contestant	Week 1	Week 2		Week 3		Week 4		Week 5		Week 6		Week 7		Week 8		Week 9		Week 10		Week 11		Week 12		Finale
Mauricio	In	Armored		Armored		Armored		Armored		Armored		Armored		Armored		Saved		Saved		Saved		Armored		Winner
Kennya	In	Saved		Armored		Armored		Saved		Armored		Saved		Armored		Saved		Saved		Saved		Saved		Runner-up
Florence	In	Armored		Duel	Saved	Armored		Armored		Armored		Duel	Saved	Armored		Saved		Duel	Saved	Saved		Saved		3rd
Elías	In	Armored		Armored		Armored		Armored		Armored		Armored		Duel	Saved	Saved		Saved		Armored		Duel	Saved	4th
Benjamín	In	Armored		Armored		Armored		Saved		Saved		Armored		Armored		Armored		Armored		Duel	Saved	Duel	Out	
Dennis	In	Armored		Armored		Armored		Duel	Saved	Armored		Armored		Armored		Armored		Armored		Duel	Out			
Michelle	In	Armored		Armored		Armored		Armored		Duel	Saved	Armored		Armored		Duel	Saved	Duel	Out					
Javi	In	Armored		Saved		Saved		Armored		Saved		Saved		Saved		Duel	Out							
Rocío	In	Armored		Armored		Armored		Armored		Armored		Armored		Duel	Out									
Marito	In	Duel	Saved	Armored		Armored		Saved		Saved		Duel	Out											
Beatriz	In	Armored		Saved		Duel	Saved	Saved		Duel	Out													
Henry	In	Saved		Armored		Armored		Duel	Out															
Danny	In	Saved		Armored		Duel	Out																	
Laura	In	Armored		Duel	Out																			
Abner	In	Duel	Out																					
Gabriela	In	Duel	Out																					
Madeline	Out																							
Tutti	Out																							
Melissa	Out																							
Armando	Out																							
Samuel	Out																							
Marinela	Out																							
Grecia	Out																							
Néstor	Out																							
Alfred	Out																							
Hilda	Out																							

KEY:

- The contestant had already been eliminated
- The contestant was selected for the Duel
- The contestant took part in the Duel and was eliminated by the judges
- The contestant took part in the Duel and was saved by the judges
- The contestant was eliminated in week 1 after not being selected by any judge
- The contestant was picked directly from his group to qualify for the competition
- The contestant was selected by the judges to qualify for the competition
- The contestant was selected by the viewers' votes to qualify for the competition
- The contestant won the weekly challenge and became automatically armored or was the first to be armored by any of the judges
- The contestant was armored by the judges
- The contestant was saved by the viewers' votes

== Season 3 (2015) ==
The show is slated to return on September 6, 2015, for a third and final season. Gerardo Parker, Juan Manuel Bolaños, Rocío Cáceres, Marinella Arrué and Rafael Alfaro will form the panel of judges.
