= ¿Quién quiere ser millonario? (Salvadoran game show) =

- Created by: David Briggs; Mike Whitehill; Steven Knight
- Presented by: Willie Maldonado
- Country of origin: El Salvador

Production
- Running time: 60 minutes

Original release
- Network: TCS
- Release: 3 March 2010 – December 31, 2014

¿Quién quiere ser millonario? (English: Who Wants to Be a Millionaire?) is a Salvadoran quiz show based on the original British format Who Wants to Be a Millionaire?. The host was Willie Maldonado. ¿Quién quiere ser millonario? was broadcast from March 3, 2010 to November 24, 2010 on the Salvadoran Television Corporation's Canal 4. The El Salvadoran version of the show offered the largest top prize of all the versions produced in Central America.

During the first season, aired from 3 March until 24 November 2010, 106 participants played in the Hot Seat, US$107,528.60 in prizes was given away with a total of 793 questions asked. During the second season, aired from March 2, 2011 until November 23 of that year, the show gave away US$104,867 in prizes to more than 100 participants.

On May 2, 2012 the third season premiered. Two more seasons were commissioned, the last episode airing on December 31, 2014.

== Money tree ==
Payout structure
Question number	Question value (in USD)
15	$200,000.00
14	$100,000.00
13	$50,000.00
12	$25,000.00
11	$12,800.00
10	$6,400.00
9	$3,200.00
8	$1,600.00
7	$800.00
6	$400.00
5	$200.00
4	$100.00
3	$60.00
2	$40.00
1	$20.00
Milestone Top prize

== Rules ==
The aim of the game was to win US$200,000 by answering 15 multiple-choice questions of increasing difficulty correctly. The show follows the classic format from the original UK version, with 15 questions and two guaranteed sums: one at the fifth question of $200, and one at the tenth question of $6,400. The money tree used in this version is the classic money tree with the values of each question divided by 5.

As with the original UK version, a preliminary game, here called La mente mas rápida, is played where the ten contestants of the show would arrange four options in a particular order and the fastest contestant would be invited to the hot seat.

A contestant can walk away at any point of the game, and by doing so they would leave with the amount that was won on the previous question. If the contestant is unsure on any questions, they can use three lifelines given to them: 50:50, Phone a Friend and Ask the Audience.

== Notable contestants ==
No contestants in this version won the top-prize question or reached the top-prize question. The highest prize won was $25,000, which was won by Javier Hernández on 19 May 2010 after walking away on his 13th question.

Some notable celebrities appeared on the show over the five years it aired, such as Daniel Rucks, host of Trato hecho, the Salvadoran version of Deal or No Deal, who appeared on the second season on 23 November 2011 and won $3,200 after walking away on the tenth question.
