= Luciana Sandoval =

- Luciana José Sandoval de Rubio
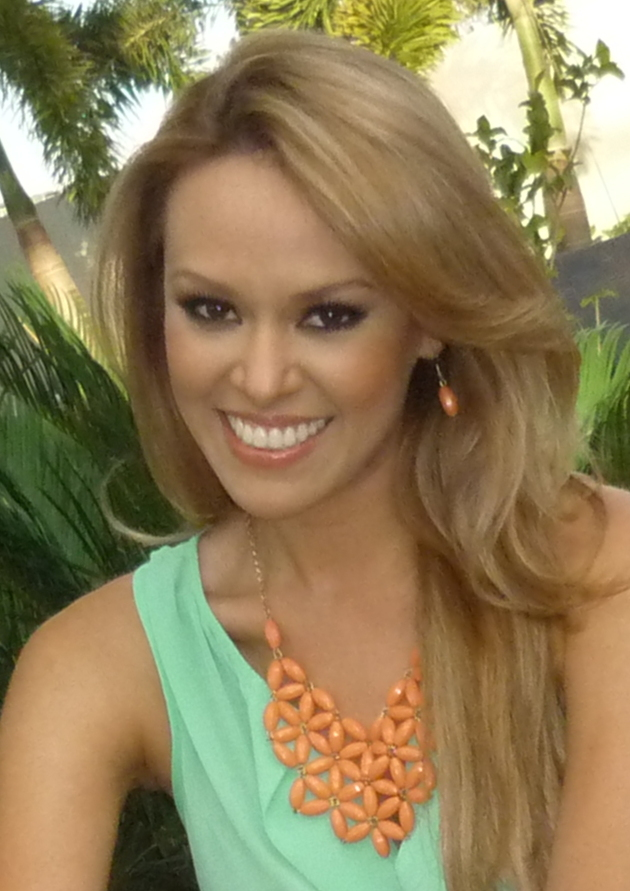
- Born: November 17, 1980 (age 45); San Salvador, El Salvador
- Occupations: Presenter; Announcer; Model
- Spouse: Marden Deleon (m. 2022)

Luciana Sandoval (born 17 September 1980) is a Salvadoran television presenter, dancer and former model.

== Life ==
From a very young age, Sandoval danced with the national ballet. With her troupe she performed on numerous entertainment programs. She began entering beauty and modeling competitions, and continued to make appearances on TV which led to her hosting the dance show Bailando por un sueño. She has since become known as a host of the morning talk show Viva la Mañana. In September 2017 she received press attention for her imitation of Beyoncé.
