= Canal 6 (Salvadoran TV channel) =

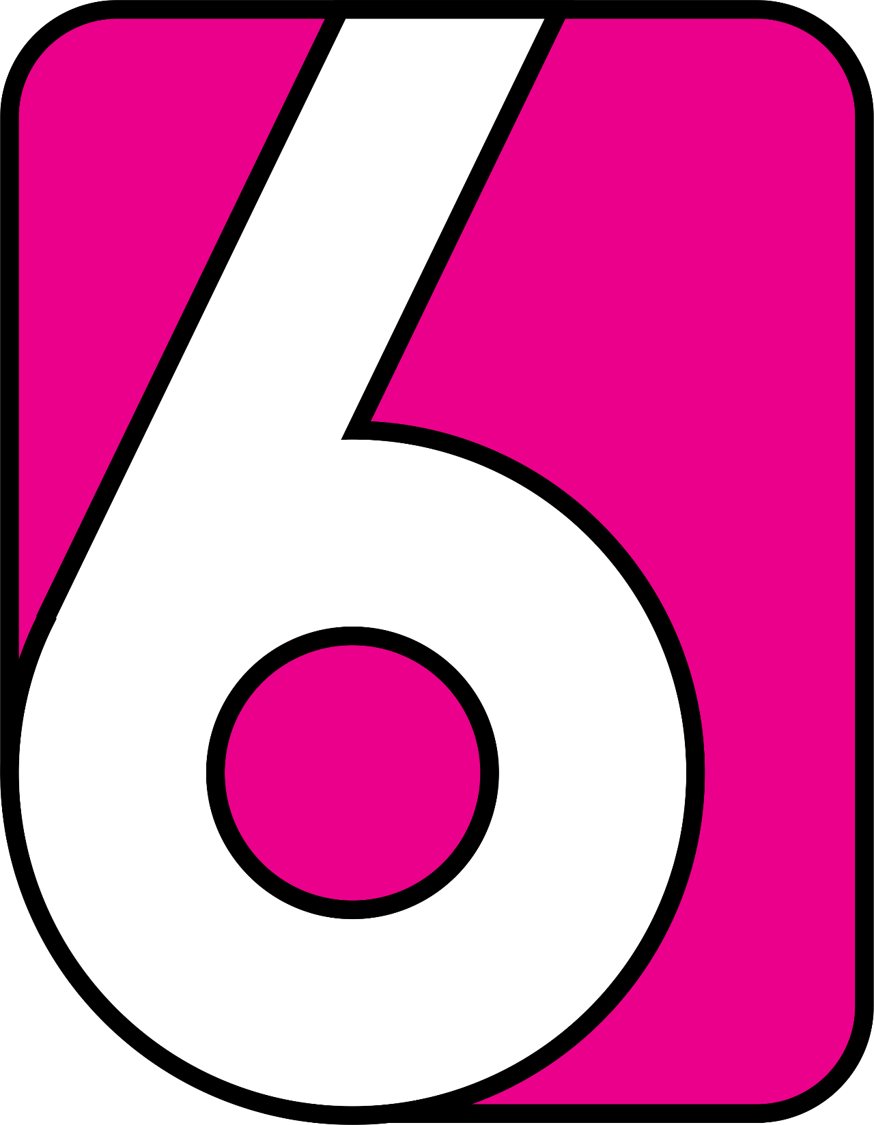
- Country: El Salvador
- Headquarters: Alameda Dr. Manuel Araujo Km. 6½ San Salvador

Programming
- Language: Spanish
- Picture format: 1080i HDTV (downscaled to 480i for the SDTV feed)

Ownership
- Owner: Telecorporación Salvadoreña
- Sister channels: Canal 2 Canal 4 TCS+

History
- Launched: 26 April 1956; 69 years ago (Note: Hiatus: 1966–1973)
- Former names: YSEB-TV 6 (1956–1966)

Links
- Website: TCSGO.com

Availability

Terrestrial
- Analog VHF (El Salvador): Channel 6

Streaming media
- TCS GO: TCS GO

Canal Seis is the flagship television channel of Telecorporacion Salvadoreña. It broadcasts from channel 6 nationwide in El Salvador.

It is believed to be the country's first television station, having launched in 1956. Color broadcasts commenced in 1973.

The channel has a general schedule on weekdays and is focused on movies on weekends.

== History ==
=== Early years ===
The first attempts to create television were made by Mexican inventor Rubén González on his own initiative on 7 September 1956, in black and white broadcast. In that same month Boris Eserski, Guillermo Pinto and Tono Alfaro, former owners of the radio station YSEB, collaborated in this creation. The first television channel launched was YSEB-TV. Its programming was based on national artistic presentations and films imported from Mexico and the United States Its programming was very short, it began at 4 in the afternoon and ended at 10 in the evening.

Days later, two other programs that Channel 6 had were included, one was a project of the Salvadoran writer Eugenio Martínez Orantes, who recited his poems live while a classical dance group interpreted them musically. The Teleperiódico program was hosted by Álvaro Menéndez Leal, a Salvadoran writer. A month later, Channel 6 implemented some new programming with Saturday Concerts, hosted by musician Nicolás Arene and Televariedades Pilsener.

In 1959, it took Channel 8 as a repeater, to cover a larger area nationwide. A year later, the television stations suffered a stagnation and a union was created between channels 4 and 6, which lasted until 1966, when Channel 6 interrupted its transmissions for the first time. In times, Channel 2 had been preferred by some audience. In July 1966, an agreement is signed to operate Canal 4.

=== Revival ===
On 6 April 1973, Canal Seis SA relaunched the company through YSLA-TV, which was the first to introduce color television. Its launch was marked by a sung jingle "Con la magia del color, Canal 6 en El Salvador" (With the magic of color, Channel 6 in El Salvador) and a mascot, painter Colorico. TCS considers 1973 to be the de facto, but not de jure, launch year of the channel. In 1986, together with Canal 2 and 4, Canal 6 was merged to form Telecorporación Salvadoreña.

With the success of Canal 12's news service, Canal 6 premiered El Noticiero. Like Teleprensa on Canal 2; instead of being produced by the channel, it aired in a time slot acquired by a businessman. It was put under TCS's jurisdiction in the mid-90s.

== Gallery ==
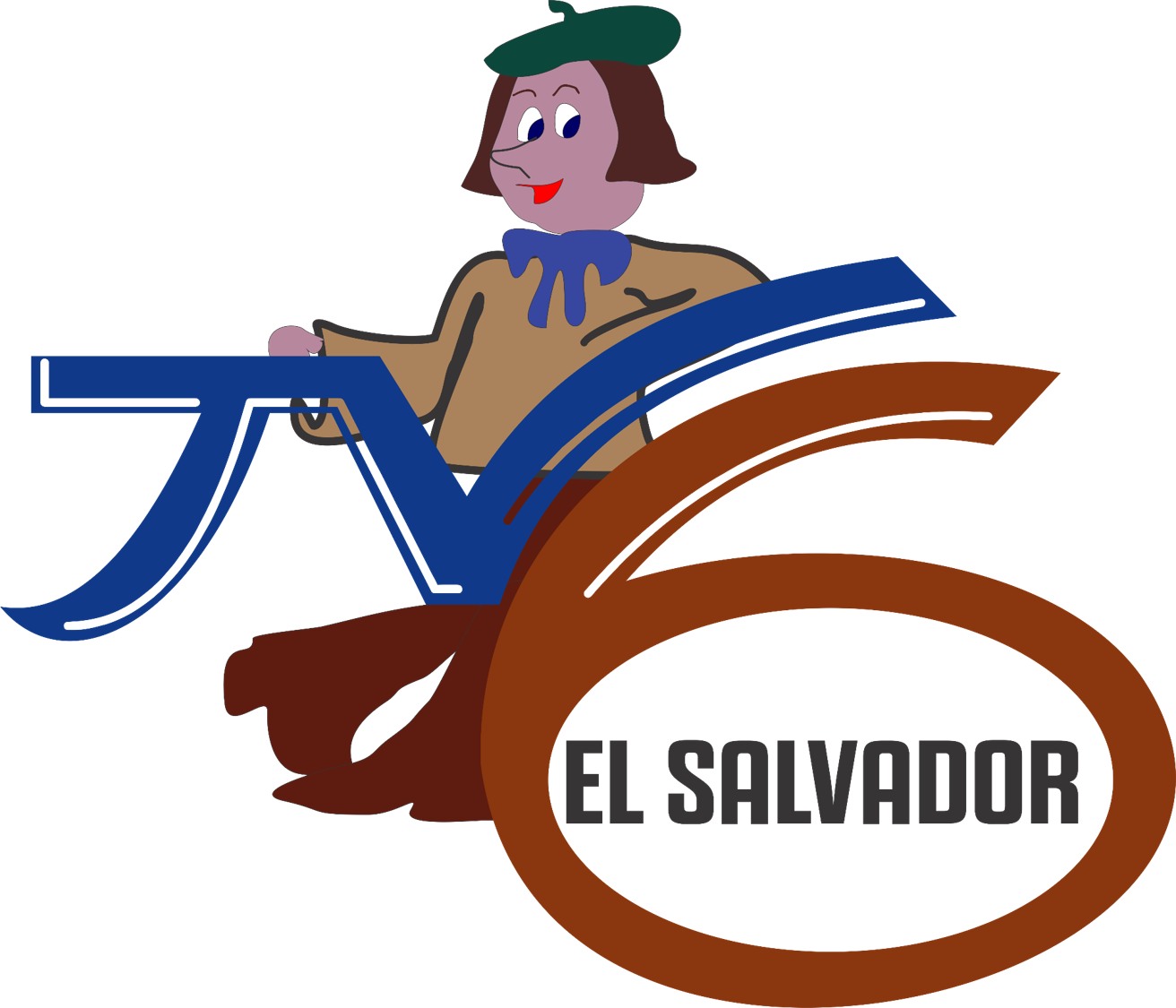
Logo used from 1973 to 1977

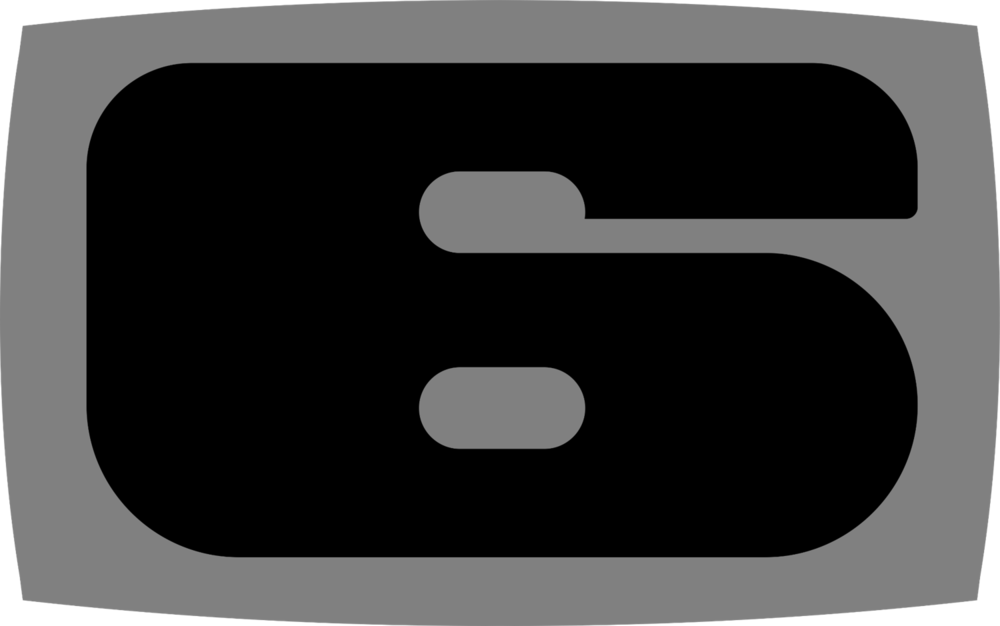
Logo used from 1986 to 1991

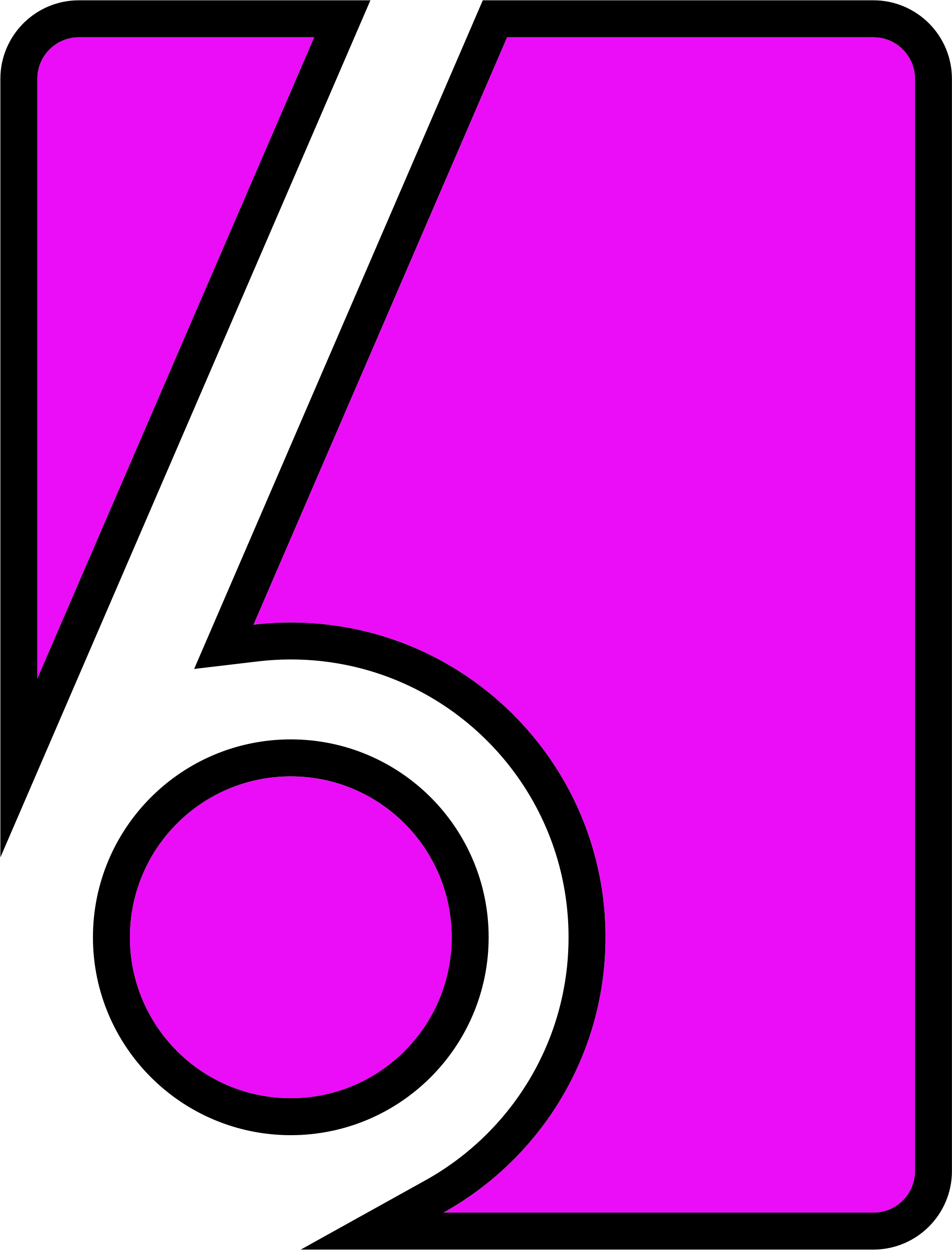
Logo used from 1991 to 2005

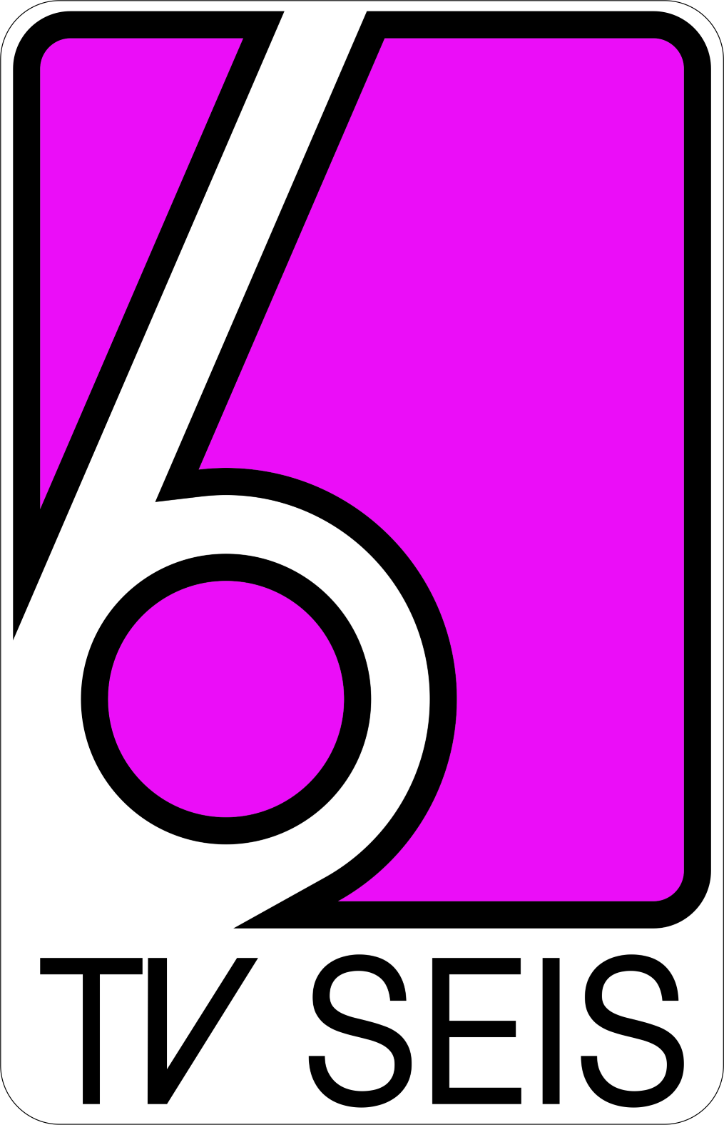
Logo used from 1991 to 1996 (with the words "TV Seis")

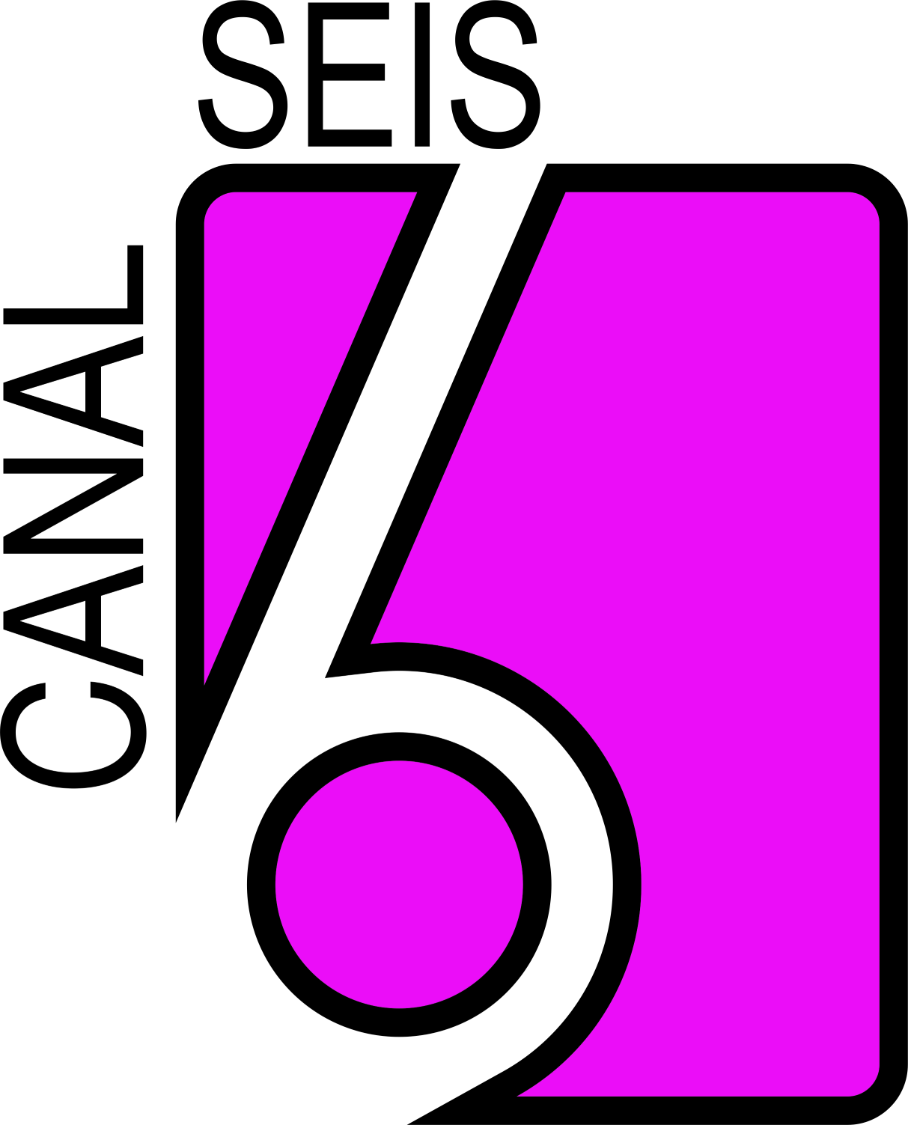
Logo used from 1996 to 2002 (with its name in the corner)

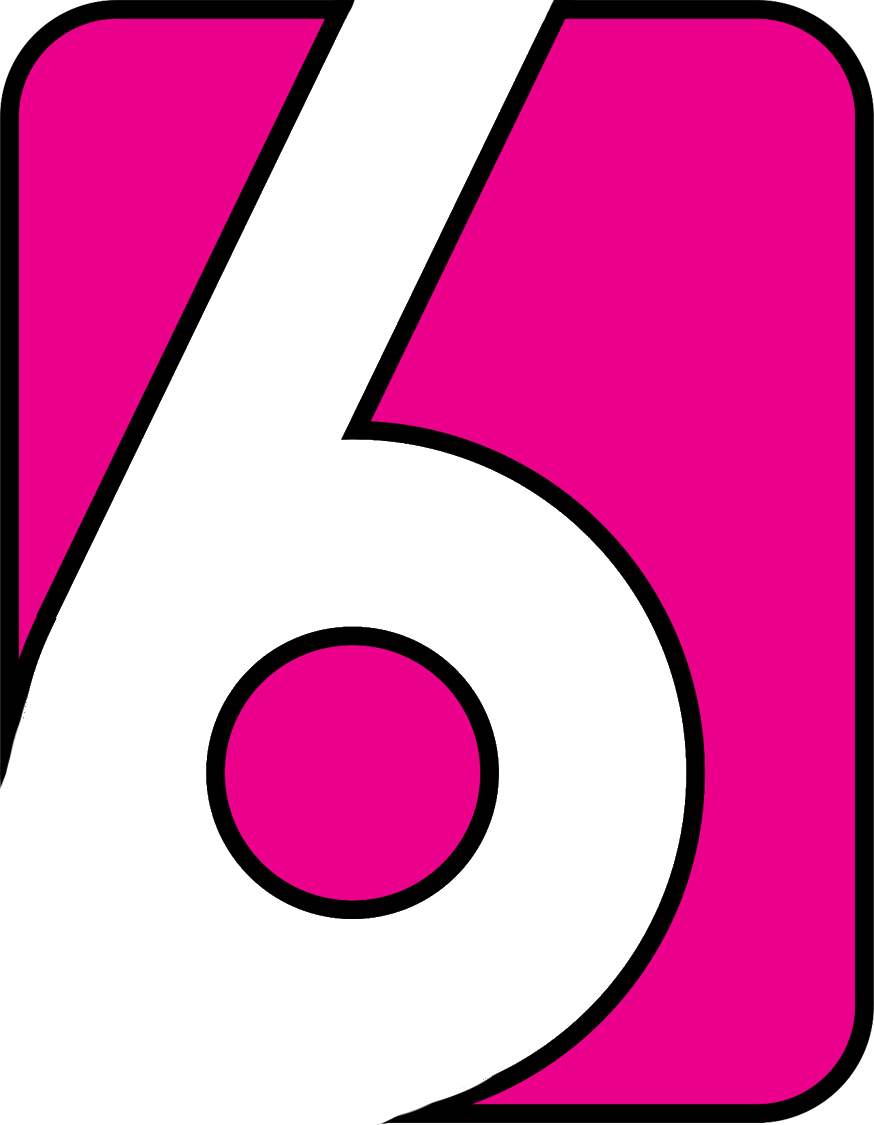
Logo used from 2006 to 2008

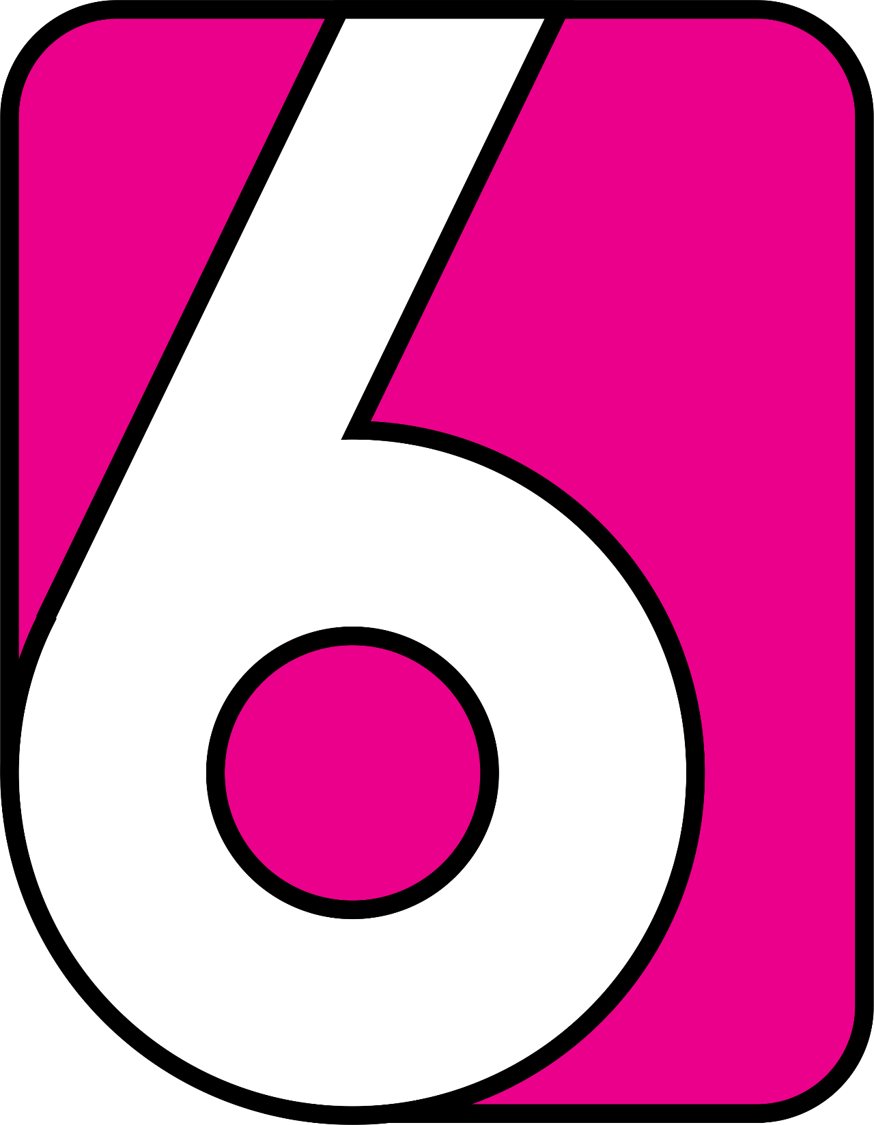
Current logo since 2008

Current logo (with slogan)
