= Canal 33 (El Salvador) =

Television channel in El Salvador

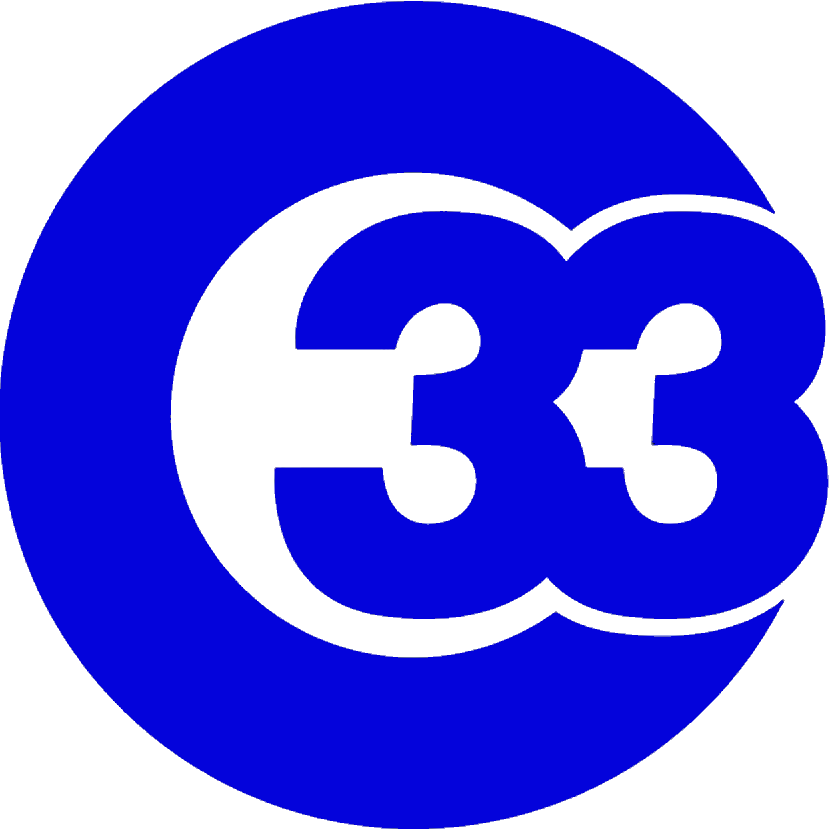
- Logo used from 2019 to 1 March 2023
- Country: El Salvador

Programming
- Picture format: 1080i HDTV (downscaled to 480i for the SDTV feed)

Ownership
- Owner: Technological University of El Salvador

History
- Launched: 20 January 1995
- Closed: 1 March 2023; (28 years, 40 days)
- Former names: Tecnovisión (1999–2007)

Links
- Website: Canal 33

Availability

Terrestrial
- Analog UHF: Channel 33

Canal 33 was a television channel in El Salvador created on 20 January 1995, by the Technological University of El Salvador after the clear response to Telecorporación Salvadoreña of being a television rival of El Salvador.

Due to a crisis it was facing at the beginning of 2023, the channel closed broadcasts on 1 March.

== History ==
It was born on 20 January 1995, with the goal of Teleprensa, the oldest news program in El Salvador, having its own channel, by breaking the partnership it had with Telecorporación Salvadoreña, after more than forty years in which said news program was broadcast by Canal 2 of TCS.

The De León family, owners of Teleprensa, obtained the frequency in 1996, and a year later they set up the Teleprensa channel.

Different problems led the De León family to sell the majority of their shares in 1998, these being acquired by the Technological University and the De León Foto company. From this moment on, José Mauricio Loucel, also the rector of the Technological University, assumes the presidency of the channel's board of directors.

With José Mauricio Loucel at the head of the board of directors and with Narciso Castillo as general director, the channel is renamed Tecnovisión, and with this begins a whole process that aims to turn Canal 33 into a channel with programming for the whole family. , maintaining information (Teleprensa) as the backbone of its programming.

Since 1 January 2023, Canal 33 entered an economic crisis, which caused some changes the next day, including the mass dismissal of employees, presenters and journalists and the cancellation of live programs (including its emblematic newscast Teleprensa). Shortly afterwards, according to close sources, the administrators decided to sell the channel for a sum of 5 million US dollars respectively.

However, the purchase was not completed, and in the end, on 1 March 2023, Channel 33 closed its broadcasts definitively without prior notice. In addition to being withdrawn from cable operators on 20 April of the same year.

== Logos ==
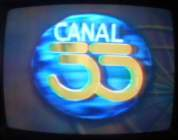
1995–1999

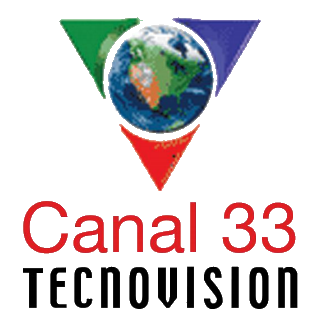
1999–2005

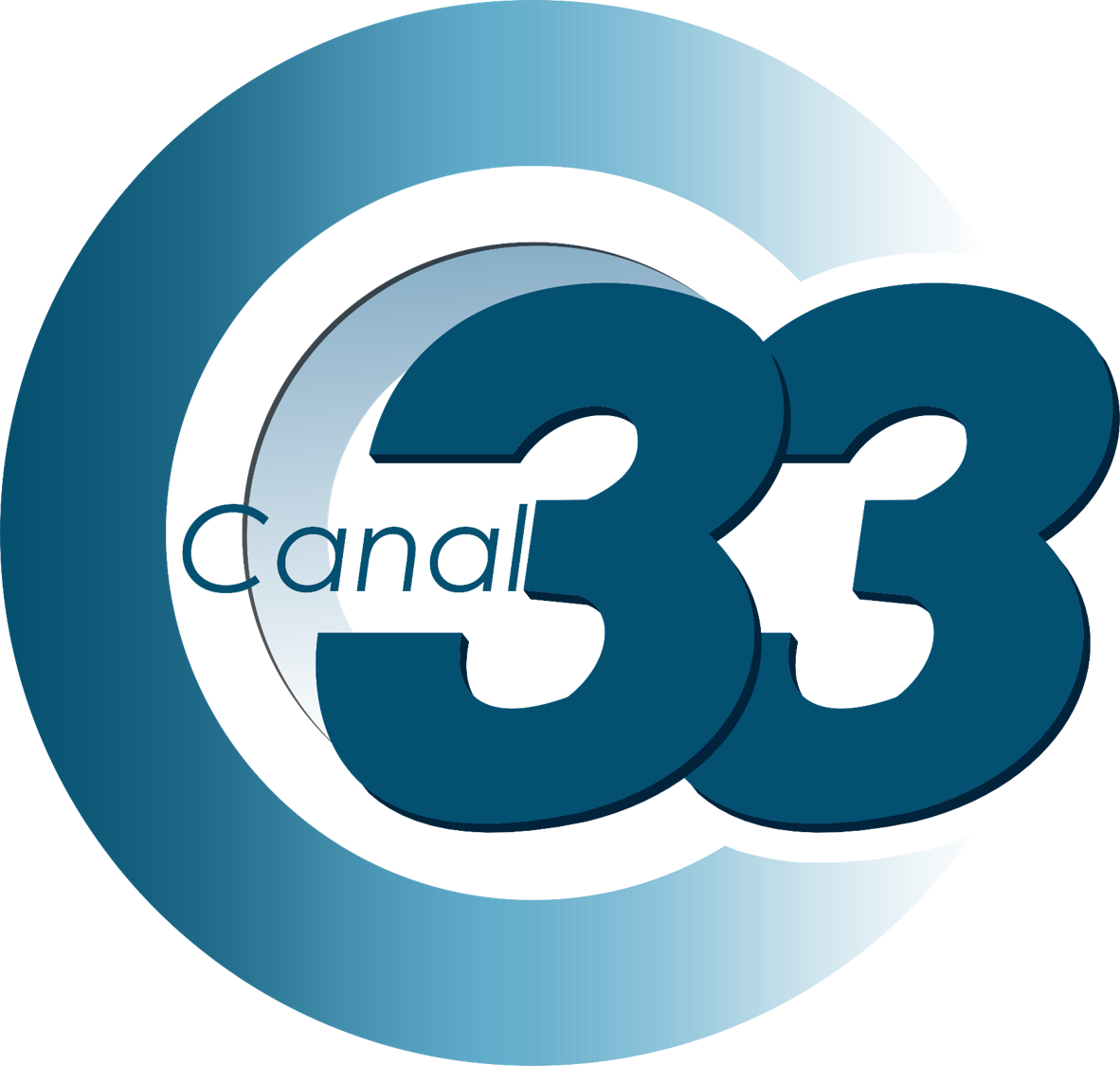
2006–2009

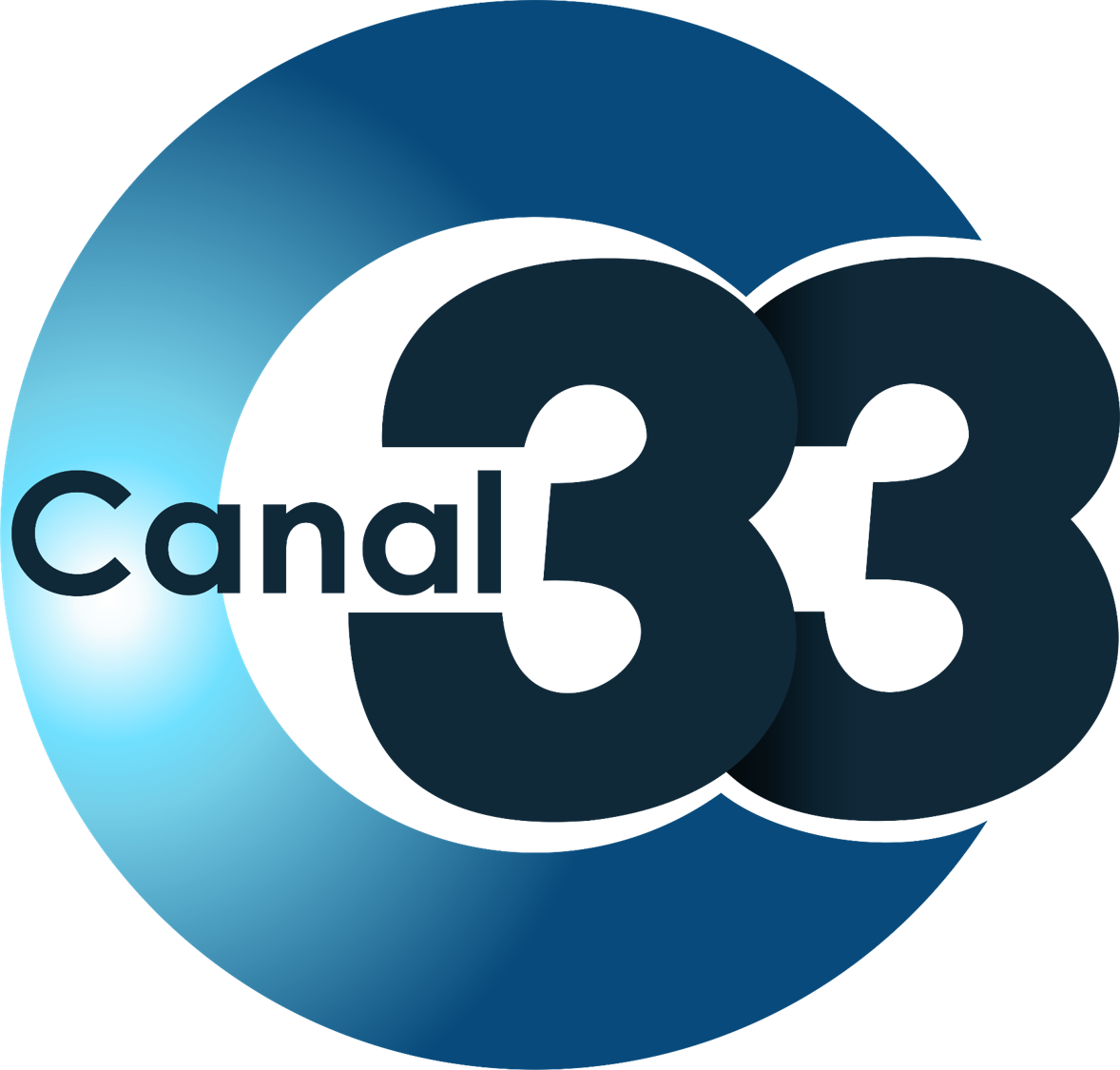
2010–2016

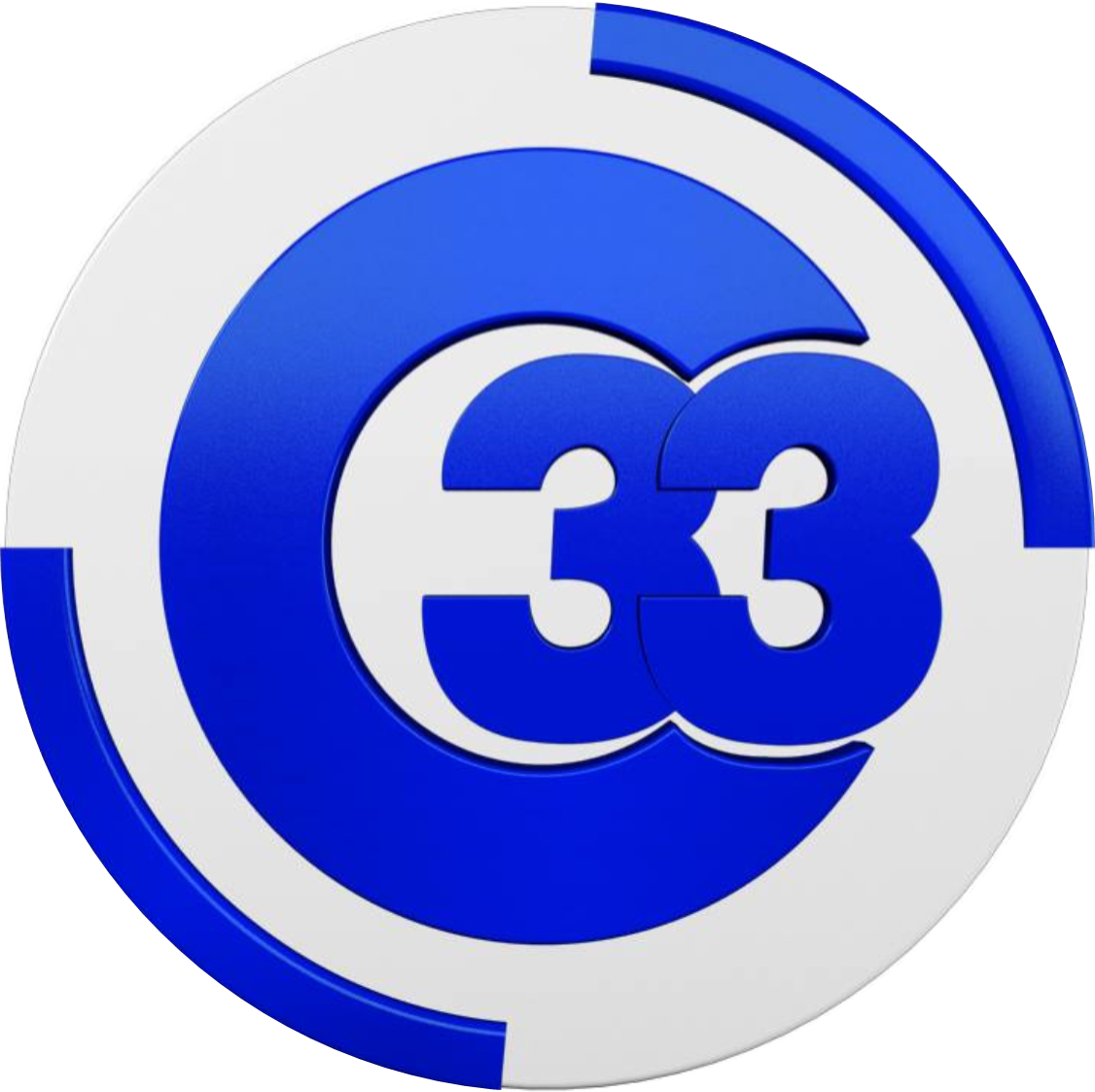
2016–2019
