= Canal 4 (Salvadoran TV channel) =

Salvadoran TV Channel

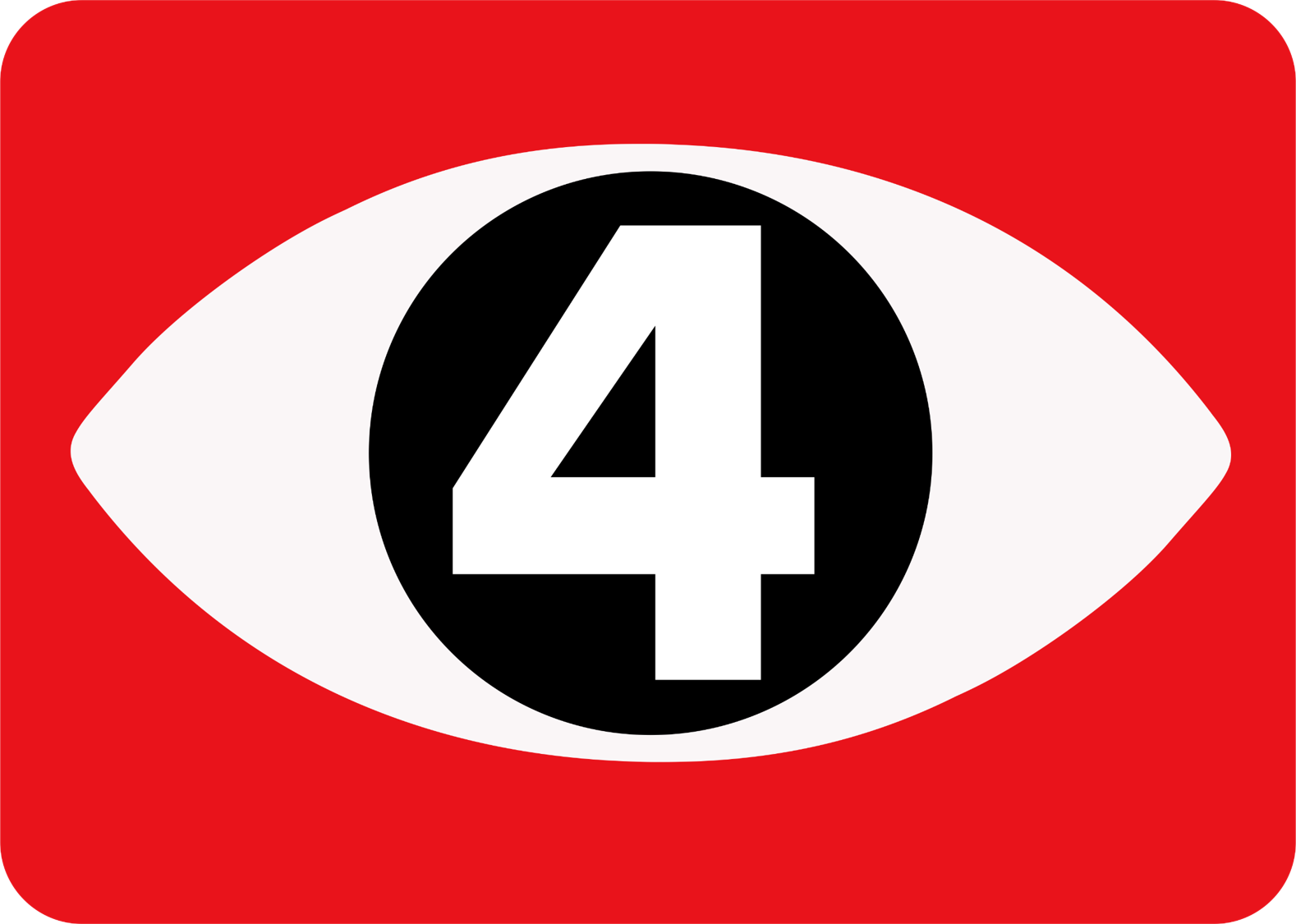
- Country: El Salvador
- Headquarters: Alameda Dr. Manuel Araujo Km. 6½ San Salvador

Programming
- Language: Spanish
- Picture format: 1080i HDTV (downscaled to 480i for the SDTV feed)

Ownership
- Owner: Telecorporación Salvadoreña
- Sister channels: Canal 2 Canal 6 TCS+

History
- Launched: 4 January 1959; 67 years ago
- Former names: YSU-TV 4 (1959–1982)

Links
- Website: TCSGO.com

Availability

Terrestrial
- Analog VHF (El Salvador): Channel 4

Streaming media
- TCS GO: TCS GO

Canal 4 is a Salvadoran television channel owned by Telecorporación Salvadoreña which broadcasts on channel 4 nationwide. It has a general schedule similar to its sister channels on weekdays and focuses more on sports during weekends. A HD feed of the channel is also available nationwide and the channel carries programs from TelevisaUnivision and Telemundo.

== History ==
On December 4, 1958, the country's second private television channel, Channel 4, began broadcasting. It remained independent until the following year, when it joined with Channel 6 to form Telecentro. Channel 4 launched with a variety of live programs, requiring significant investment and capital management for its production. However, it closed its doors in 1963, just five years after going on air. In July 1966, Channel 4 was relaunched under a lease agreement with the company YSU.

In 1974, Channel 4 adopted color broadcasting. Due to the political crisis of the time, its programming focused on entertainment rather than news related to national events. Starting with the 1982 World Cup in Spain, the channel became known for its sports programming. On April 27, 1992, Channel 4 premiered its first news segment, titled Noticiero 4 Visión.

During the 1998 World Cup in France, a legal battle arose involving the channel. Telecorporación Salvadoreña (TCS), which had acquired exclusive television and radio rights to the matches, only broadcast them on Channel 4 rather than across its network. TCS sued Channels 12 and 21 for using footage in their news broadcasts, while the defendants argued it was within their right to inform the public.

On July 11, 2002, a fire, caused by a short circuit, broke out at the Channel 4 facilities and those of TCS Noticias. The fire interrupted transmission for over three hours, destroyed almost all archival material from Channel 4, and affected 180 employees. Due to a lack of water, the National Administration of Aqueducts and Sewers (ANDA) assisted with 40 firefighters and eight units. Broadcasts resumed later that evening. In 2007, Sky México acquired the Central American operations of DirecTV, renegotiating the broadcasting rights for several exclusive sports events, such as those of the First Division of Spain. This led to the cancellation of existing contracts with all Central American free-to-air channels in April 2009.
