= Canal 2 (Salvadoran TV channel) =

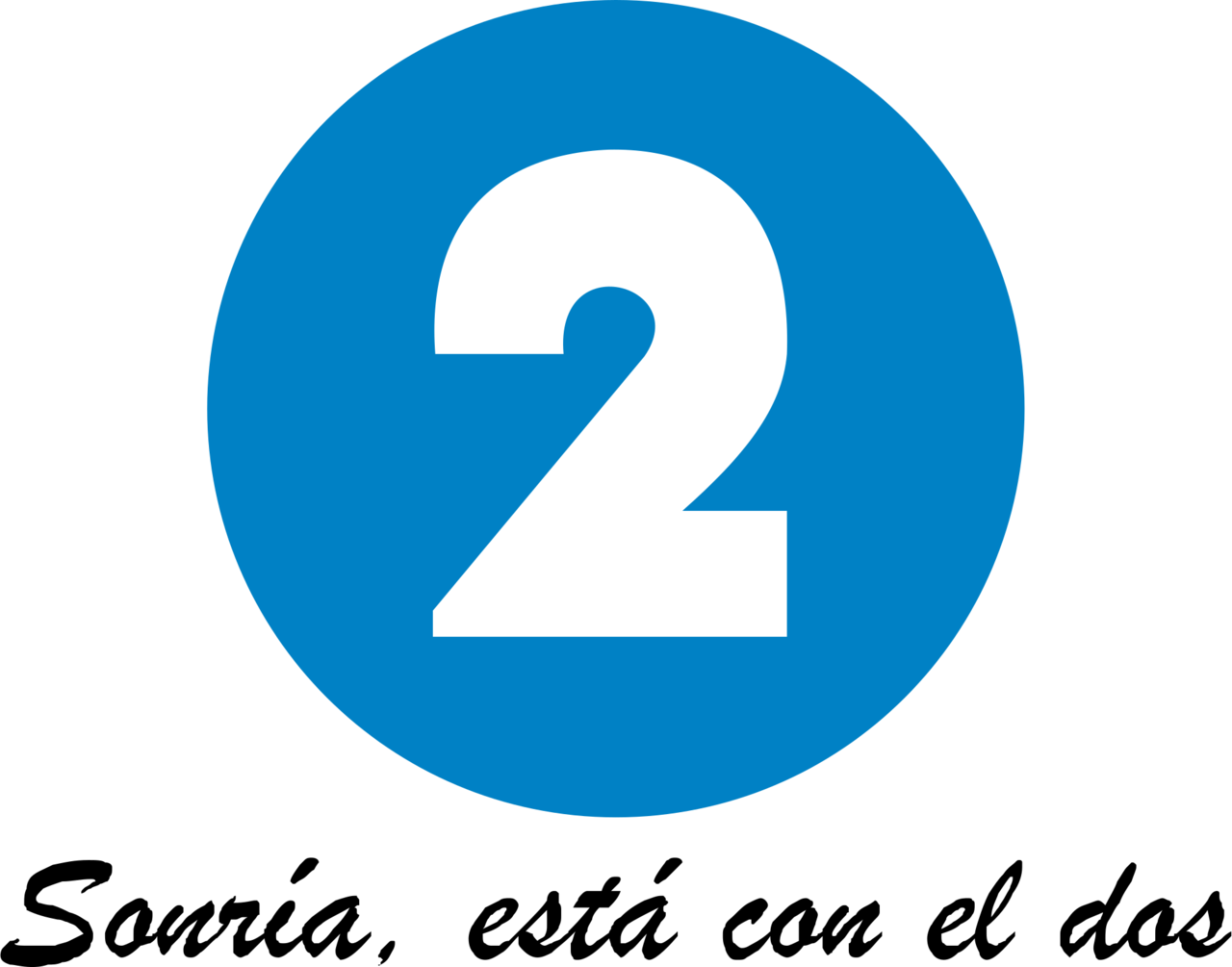
- Country: El Salvador
- Headquarters: Alameda Dr. Manuel Araujo Km. 6½ San Salvador

Programming
- Language: Spanish
- Picture format: 1080i HDTV (downscaled to 480i for the SDTV feed)

Ownership
- Owner: Telecorporación Salvadoreña
- Sister channels: Canal 4 Canal 6 TCS+

History
- Launched: 30 November 1965; 60 years ago
- Former names: YSR-TV 2 (1965–1995)

Links
- Website: TCSGO.com

Availability

Terrestrial
- Analog VHF (El Salvador): Channel 2

Streaming media
- TCS GO: TCS GO

Canal 2 (also known as TV-2) is a Salvadoran television channel of Telecorporacion Salvadoreña. The channel broadcasts on channel 2 nationwide.

== History ==
The channel started broadcasting on November 30, 1965. The channel's callsign is YSR-TV which is founded by Boris Eserski, owner of the YSR radio station. The station initially broadcast an educational service, similar to Canal 10, but in 1966, the station was facing problems and began a strategic union with Canal 4 in order to keep the station afloat.

In its early years it started broadcasting at around noon, notable imports included Mexican productions such as La Tremenda Corte, Chespirito, Capulina, El Show del Loco Valdés, La criada bien criada, the Latin American version of Topo Gigio and the 1950s Zorro TV series. After sign-on the station aired cartoons and live-action series (The Flintstones, Astro Boy, Johnny Sokko and His Flying Robot, Ultraman) followed by the noon edition of Teleprensa. The station later shut down for a four hour period before returning in the late afternoon hours, beginning with the local cooking show Aprendamos a cocinar, presented by Vilma G. de Escobar (1930-2020). A second session of children's programs followed either with old film serials or TV series (either The Flintstones or early Marvel animated series). On Sundays the channel broadcast Festival Cinematográfico, mainly airing old Mexican movies, and during primetime, Premier Mundial. It also broadcast telenovelas from Telesistema Mexicano (later Televisa) and Venezuelan channels.

Color transmissions commenced in 1973. It joined channels 4 and 6 in November 1986 to form Telecorporación Salvadoreña. On January 2, 1995, it launched its own news service, Teledos, replacing Teleprensa, which had moved to Canal 33.

== Logos ==
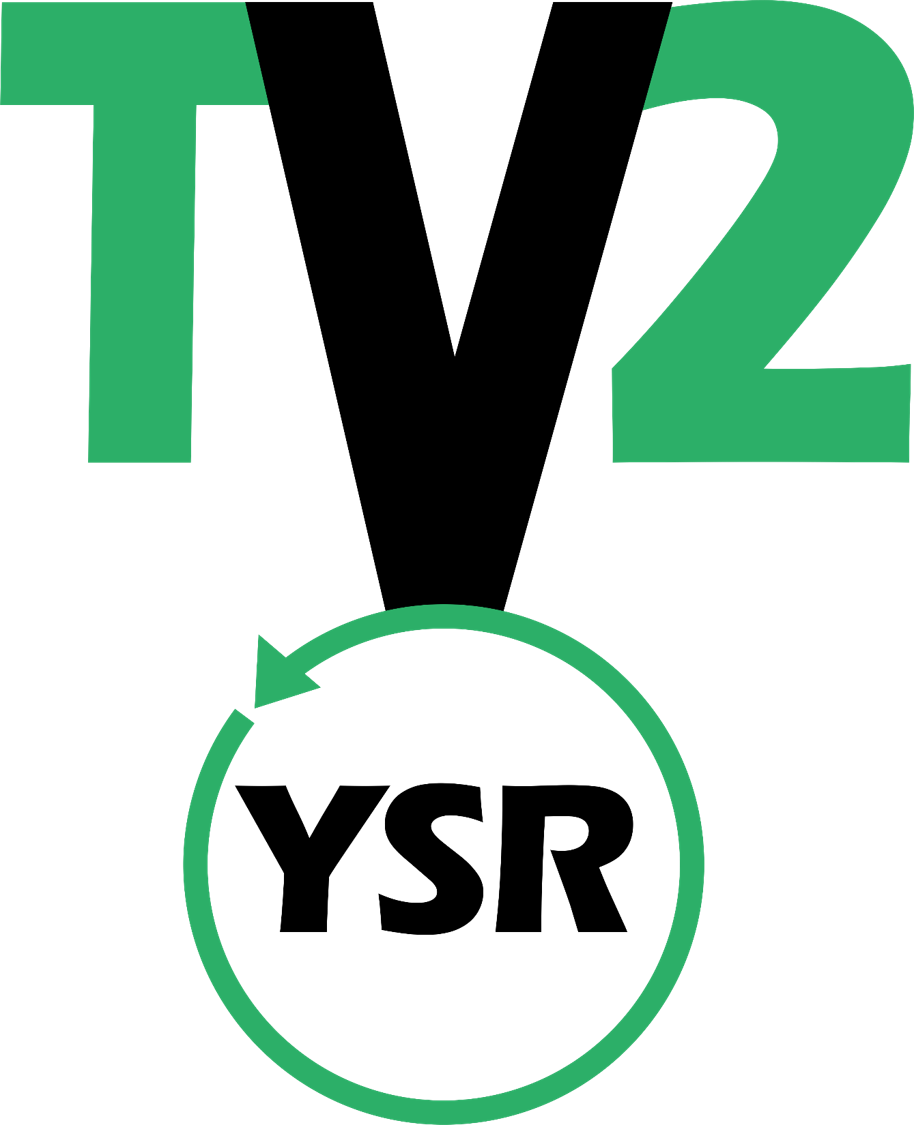
Logo used from 1965 to 1984.

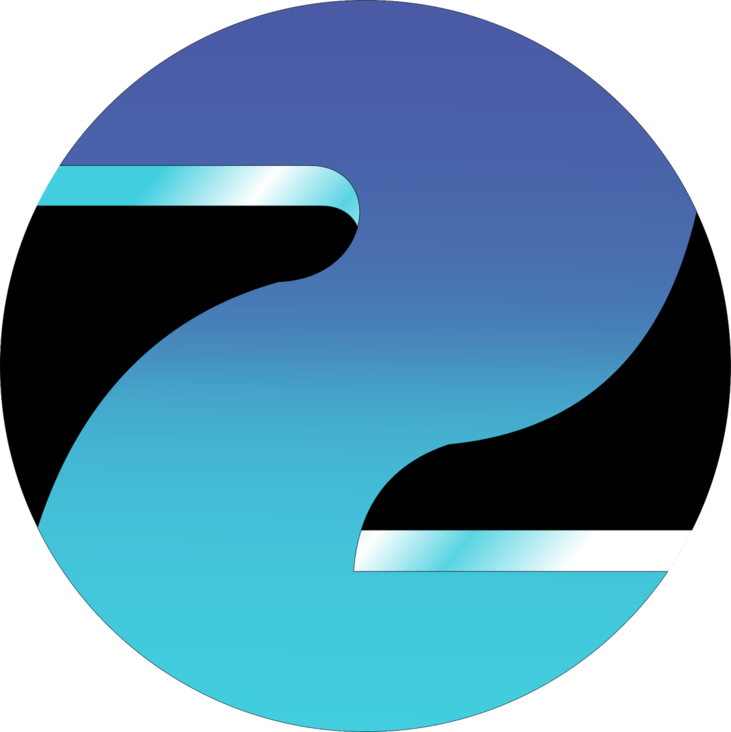
Logo used from 1984 to 1987.

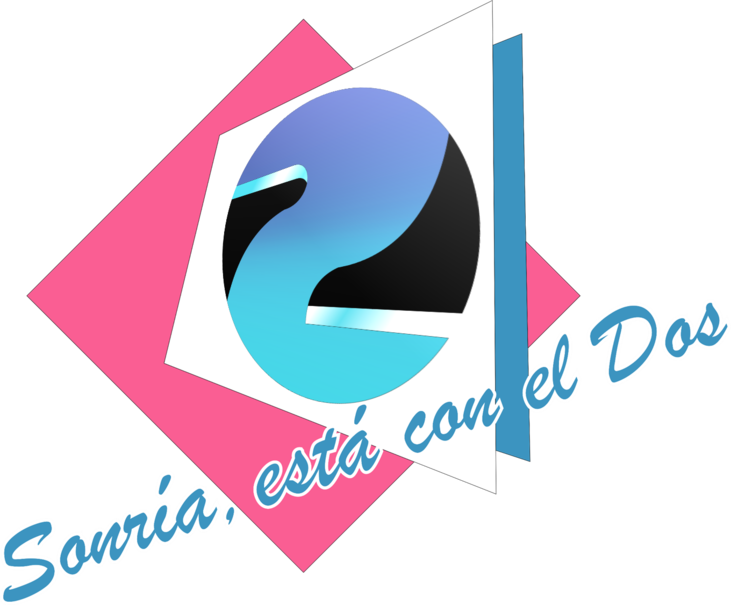
Logo used from 1987 to 1995 (with slogan).

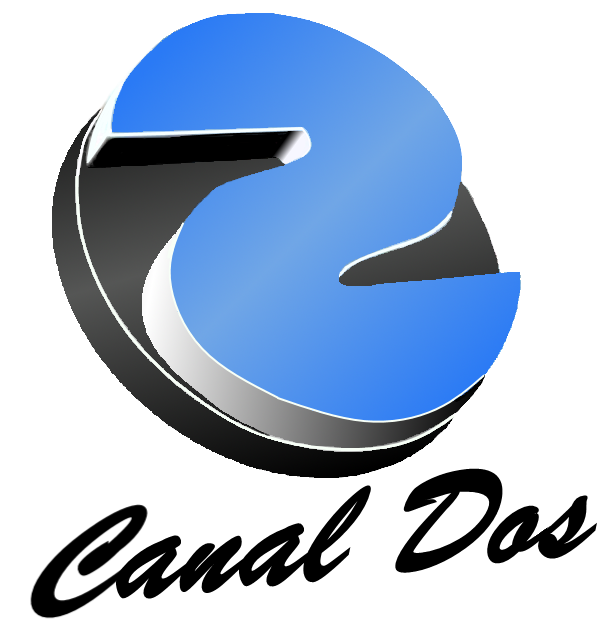
Logo used from 1995 to 2003.

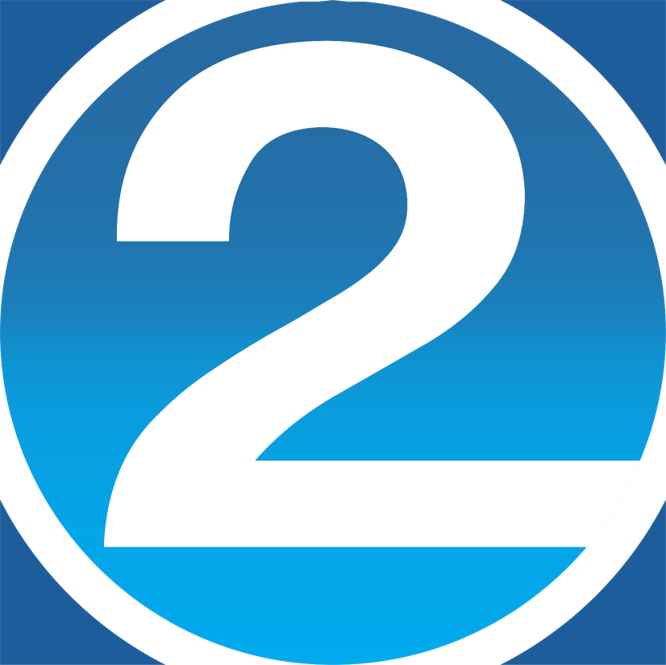
Logo used from 2003 to 2005.

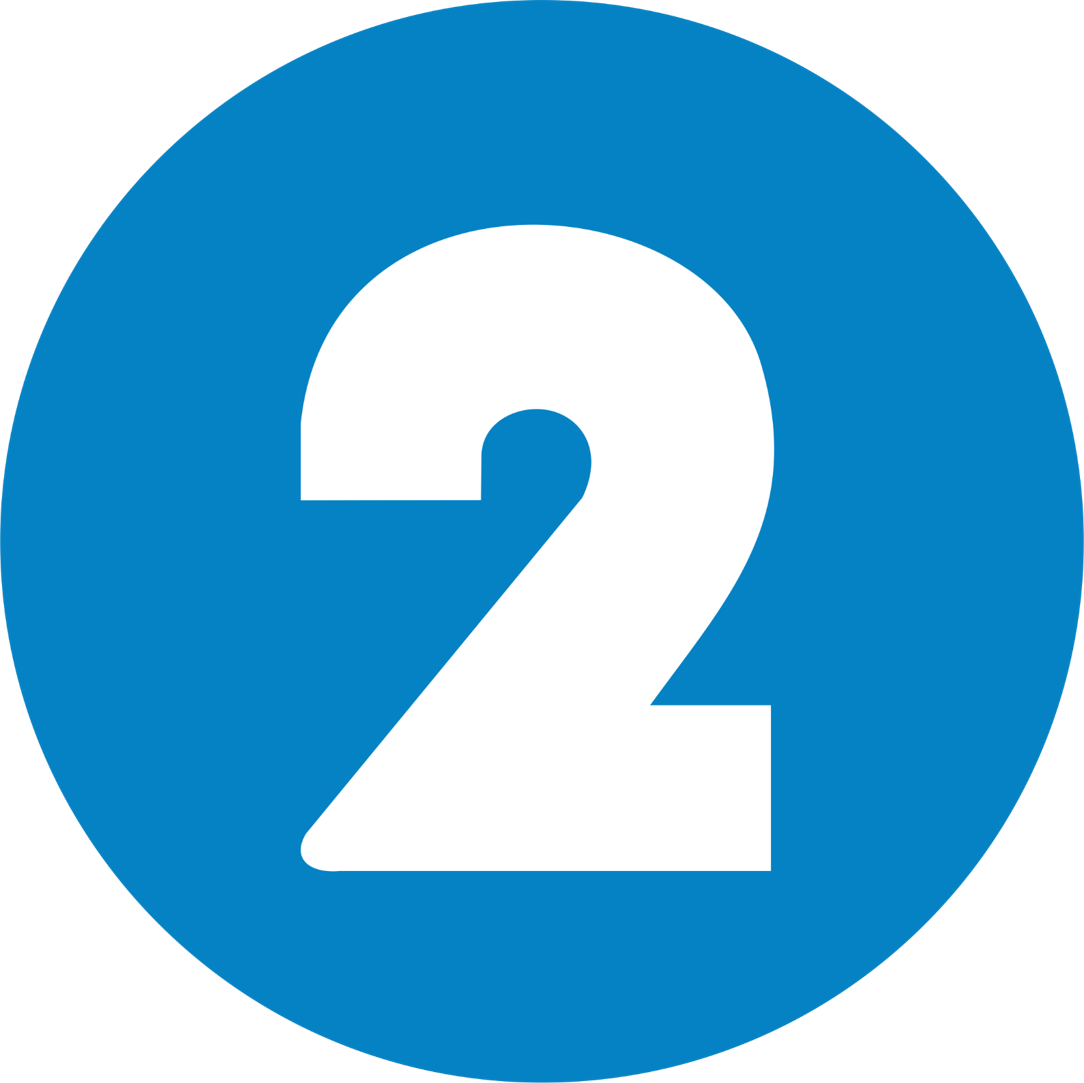
Current Logo since 2005.

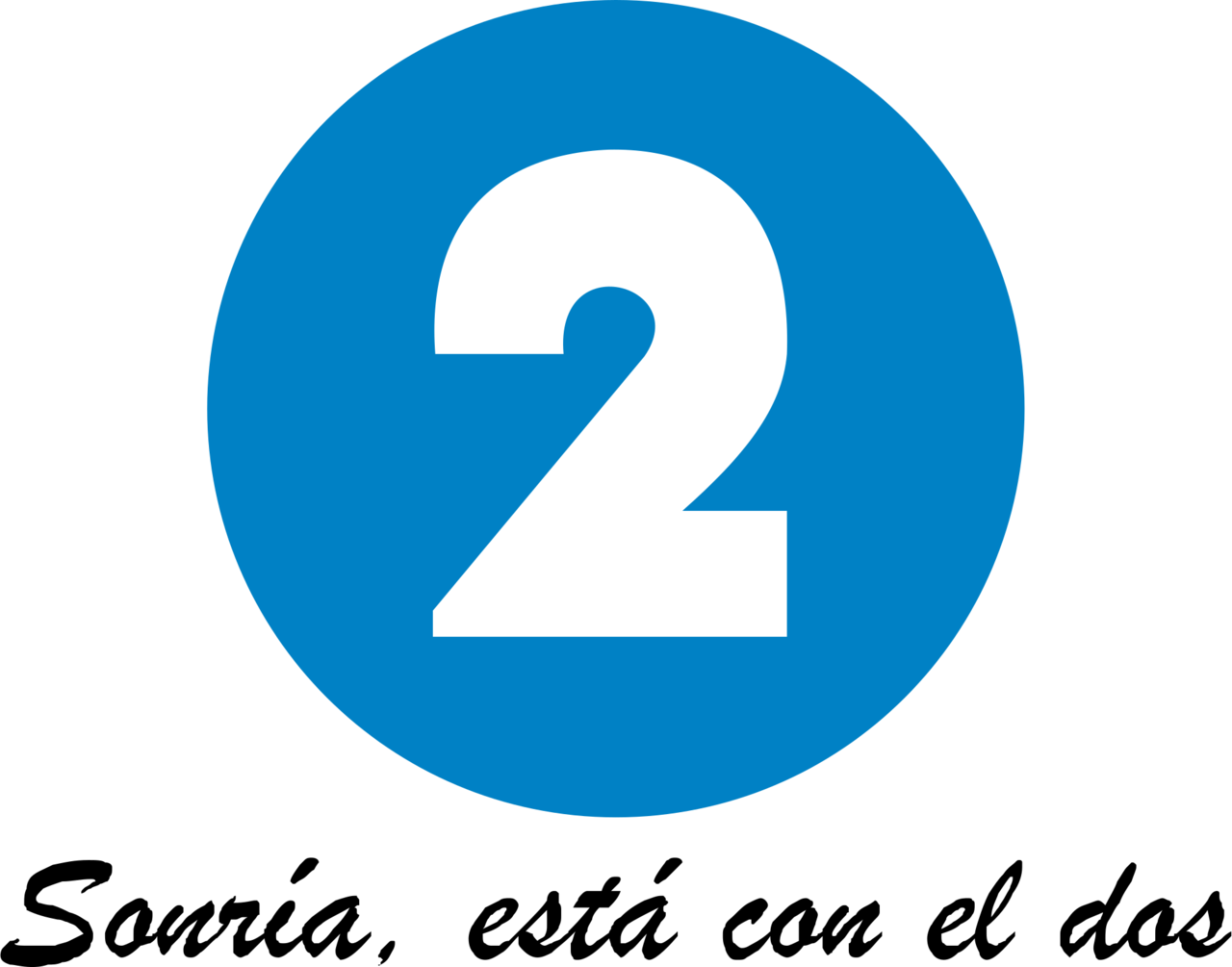
Current Logo (with slogan).
