= Telecorporación Salvadoreña =

Television network corporation in El Salvador

Telecorporación Salvadoreña S.A.
- Logo used since 1 January 2002

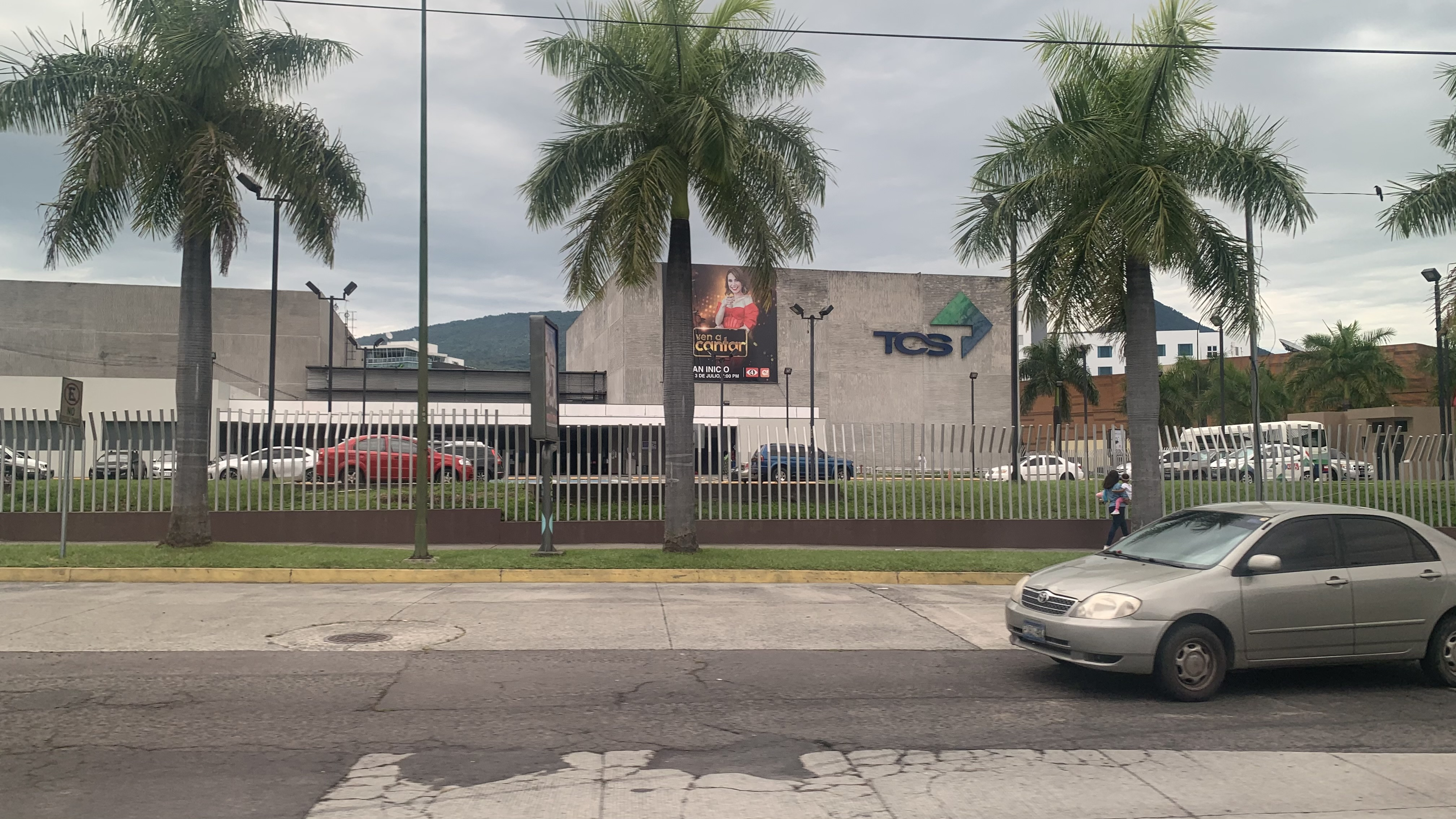
- Telecorporación Salvadoreña's headquarters in Antiguo Cuscatlan, El Salvador
- Type: Private
- Industry: Mass media
- Founded: 1 November 1985; 40 years ago
- Founder: Boris Eserski
- Headquarters: Carretera Panamericana y Calle N°3, Antiguo Cuscatlán, La Libertad, El Salvador
- Area served: Worldwide from El Salvador
- Products: Broadcasting; Radio; Web portals
- Services: Television; Radio; Online
- Website: tcsahora.com tcsgo.com

Telecorporación Salvadoreña (TCS) is a television network corporation in El Salvador. Telecorporación Salvadoreña is a group of local television stations formed by channels 2, 4, 6, and SV+. (channel 35) TCS launched began transmissions on channel 31. The channel stopped analog broadcasts in NTSC and was launched in the TDT on the same frequency, within the virtual channel 31.1, with programming of the TCS files in test signal Most of the time each channel has an independent programming schedule, but the channels do share limited programming and simulcasts, particularly on weekday mornings. When linked together, the network name (Telecorporación Salvadoreña) is used instead of the channels' individual names (2, 4, and 6).

Besides the four television stations, TCS also has two radio stations: VOX FM and Que Buena

== Terrestrial networks ==
Network	Flagship	Programming
Canal 2	YSR-TV 2	general programming, entertainment, TV series, novels, and news.
Canal 4	YSU-TV 4	general programming, sports, entertainment, and news.
Canal 6	YSLA-TV 6	general progtamming, novels, reruns, movies, entertainment series, news, and music.
SV+	YSUT-TV 35	Broadcasts all TCS programming

== Shows ==
Telecorporacion Salvadoreña's shows include on air:

- Viva la Mañana
- Play
- La Polémica
- Liberadas
- DC4
- Salvadoreños Comprometidos (September 2013 - Present) (the program is held once every year)
- Los Doctores
- Al Limite (Started May 03, 2026)
- Llévatelo Más (Started August 17, 2026, replacing "Prendi2" and "Llévatelo")
- Conexión Digital
- Yo me Llamo: All Stars

== Off-Air Programs ==
- Brinka
- Club Disney
- La Hora Warner
- Chivisimo
- Hollywood Pack
- Duro Blandito
- Comencemos Ya!
- Código Fama El Salvador
- Fin de Semana
- ¿Quién quiere ser millonario?
- Nuestra Belleza El Salvador
- Bailando por un sueño El Salvador
- Cantando por un sueño El Salvador
- Tal Para Cual
- Conéctate 2Night
- La Comedia Hora
- Dale Watts
- Código Fama El Salvador
- Acoplados
- Sabaton
- Alo Verano
- "PLOP"
- Reto Centroamericano de Baile
- El Jardín de la Tía Bubu
- Jardín Infantil
- Variedades del 6
- Ticket con Francisco Cáceres
- Éxitos Musicales
- El número uno
- El Número Uno Kids
- El Número Uno VIP
- Calle 7 El Salvador (until the seventh season)
- Tu Nai
- Top Chef El Salvador 1º 2º and 3º
- A Todo o Nada
- Grandiosas
- Ponte Fit
- Picante y Sabroso (currently on TVX)
- Fit TV (currently on TVX)
- Estrellas del Baile (on air 09/29/2019)
- En Vivo Con...
- Tele Cash
- Trato Hecho (Deal or No Deal) (Season 5, September 6, 2020 - ended September 5, 2021, with 47 participants and delivered a quantity of $79,733.50 to each participant throughout the program development.)
- Top Chef Estrellas (Starts on September 26, 2021 - ended on December 19, 2021) resulting as the winner Marjorie Madrid with the amount of $ 25,000 USD.
- Domingo para Todos (May 27, 1987 - December 26, 2021) (the closure was known due to the sponsors and the ratings of spectators that it put to end because of the Covid-19.)
- La Tenchis
- Ven a Cantar 1º and 2º (Season 1, Jul 3 or Sep 18, 2022/Season 2, Mar 5 or May 28, 2023)
- La Mera Mezcla
- Miss Universe 2023 (November 17, 2023, in partnership with Telemundo and Roku)
- Noticias TCS+ (News)
- A cocinar!
- Invasión 51
- Secretos de cocina
- Ven a Bailar (September 17 / December 10, 2023) (Season 1)
- Lo que Hay en la Refri
- Navidad en Casa
- Yo me Llamo
- Camino a la Copa (Ended June 10, 2026)
- El Salvador Quiero Verte
- Prendi2 (Started April 03, 2022, ended August 16, 2026)
- Llevatelo (Started February 03, 2020, ended August 14, 2026)

== International ==
On June 1, 2008, Telecorporación Salvadoreña created an alliance with DirecTV where in Channel 429 of Telecentro, DirecTV is the one in charge to transmit all the national programs of TCS in the United States and Canada.

This is one of the passages for the internationalization of the television transmitter, another one of the plans to the future that it has TCS is to inaugurate the live signal of the 4 channels of the television transmitter in its Internet page.

The alliances on which it counts TCS, are another one of the factors that contribute to the exchange of information and variety of programming on which it counts. The strategic alliances that the television transmitter owns are:

== Logos ==
Since its foundation, Telecorporación Salvadoreña uses the "TCS" initials as an abbreviation of the company.

Logo used from 1985 to 2002.

Current logo since 2002.

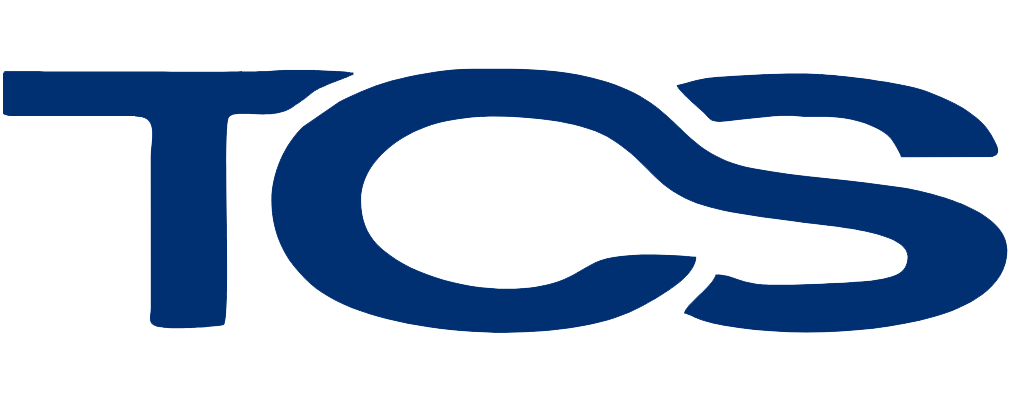
Current logo without a logotype.
