= Music of Latin America =

Collective term for the dances, rhythms and styles of music from Latin America

- Stylistic origins: Music of Spain; Music of Portugal; Indigenous American music; Music of Africa; Classical music; Canzone napoletana
- Cultural origins: 16th century, Latin America

Subgenres
- Axé; Bachata; Baião; Bambuco; Banda; Batucada; Bolero; Bomba; Boogaloo; Bossa nova; Brazilian rock; Cha-cha-cha; Champeta; Candombe; Changüí; Charanga; Chilena; Choro; Conga; Conjunto; Contradanza; Corrido; Cuarteto; Cueca; Cumbia; Danza; Danzón; Dembow; Duranguense; Filin; Forró; Frevo; Funk carioca; Grupera; Guaguancó; Guajira; Guaracha; Huapango; Huayno; Jarabe; Jarana yucateca; Joropo; Lambada; Lundu; Mambo; Mariachi; Merengue; Milonga; Música popular brasileira; New Mexico music; Norteño; Norteño-sax; Nueva canción; Nueva trova; Orquesta típica; Pachanga; Pagode; Pambiche; Pasillo; Punta; Payada; Plena; Porro; Punto guajiro; Ranchera; Reggaeton; Rondalla; Rumba; Salsa; Samba; Seis; Sertanejo; Son calentano; Son cubano; Son jalisciense; Son jarocho; Son montuno; Songo; Tango music; Tejano; Tierra Caliente music; Timba; Tonada; Trío romántico; Tropicália; Vallenato; Vals criollo; Xuc

Fusion genres
- Alternative; Ballad; Hip hop; Jazz; Pop; Reggae; Rock

Regional scenes
- Argentina; Bolivia; Brazil; Chile; Colombia; Costa Rica; Cuba; Dominican Republic; Ecuador; El Salvador; Guatemala; Honduras; Mexico; Nicaragua; Panama; Paraguay; Peru; Puerto Rico; United States; Uruguay; Venezuela

The music of Latin America refers to music originating from Latin America, namely the Spanish and Portuguese-speaking regions of the Americas south of the United States. Latin American music's origins are a mix of the music of the region's indigenous peoples with the musical traditions brought to the region by European colonists and African slaves. Due to its highly syncretic nature, Latin American music encompasses a wide variety of styles, including influential genres such as cumbia, bachata, bossa nova, merengue, rumba, salsa, samba, son, candombe and tango. During the 20th century, many styles were influenced by the music of the United States giving rise to genres such as Latin pop, rock, jazz, hip hop, and reggaeton.

Geographically, it usually refers to the Spanish and Portuguese-speaking regions of Latin America, but sometimes includes Francophone countries and territories of the Caribbean and South America as well. It also encompasses Latin American styles that have originated in the United States such as, New Mexico music, Tejano, various forms of country-Western, as well as Chicano rock, Nuyorican rap, and Chicano rap. The origins of Latin American music can be traced back to the Spanish and Portuguese conquest of the Americas in the 16th century, when the European settlers brought their music from overseas. Latin American music is performed in Spanish and Portuguese.

== Popular music styles by country and territory ==
=== Argentina ===
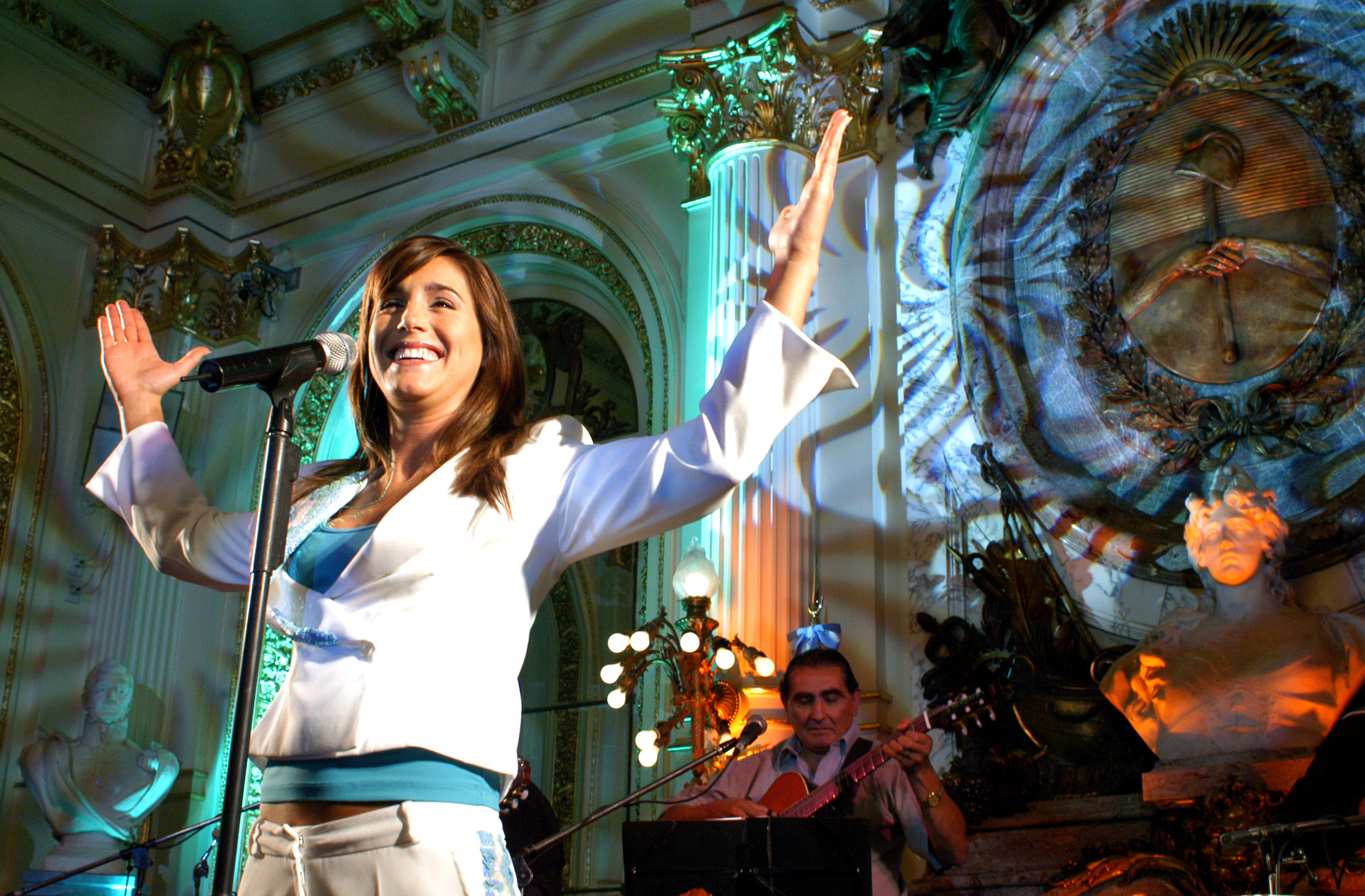
Soledad Pastorutti in the White Room of the Pink House.

While the exact origins of tango remain uncertain, Argentine writer Jorge Luis Borges believed the genre to have originated in the brothels of 19th century Buenos Aires or Montevideo. Editors of World Music: The Rough Guide (2000) called Borges' statement "a little presumptive" and pinpoint the early developments of tango to the bars frequented by porteños. Emerging from a melting pot of European immigrants, criollos, blacks, and indigenous peoples, the genre is believed to have been influenced by Andalusian flamenco, Spanish contradanse, Italian folk music, Cuban habanera, African candombe and percussion, German polkas, Polish mazurkas, and Argentine milonga. In its early history, tango music was associated with brawls at brothels and knife-wielding womanizing men, known locally as malevos or compadritos. By 1914, men outnumbered women in Argentina by 100,000, leading to an increased rate of prostitution and the brothel lifestyle that came with it. Men would often dance at cafes and bars and try to outdo one another with improvised dance steps in an attempt to attract a woman.

Their dances were characterized by "showy yet threatening, predatory quality, often revolving around a possessive relationship between two men and one woman". In its original form, tango music included the violin, guitar, and flute. By the late 19th century, the bandoneon had been introduced into the genre. The instrument, first developed in Germany for playing folk and religious music in churches that lacked organs, is believed to have been brought to the region by immigrants and sailors. One of its early pioneers, Eduardo Arolas, was nicknamed the "Tiger of the Bandoneón". Arolas believed the instrument was made to play in tango. Vicente Greco is credited with standardizing tango with his group, Orquesta Típica Criolla, by using two violins and two bandoneons. The instrumentation of tango remained largely unchanged until the 1940s. Tango music began playing in populated areas such as fairgrounds and streets in Buenos Aires. It contained lyrics that were "sometimes obscene and deeply fatalistic". Similar to families in the United States during the rise of rock and roll, families in the area tried to shield their children from tango. Upper-classmen began taking an interest in tango: writer Ricardo Güiraldes performed tango during a tour of Europe in 1910 and has been credited with introducing tango in Europe. Güiraldes' introduction made tango the first Latin dance to gain popularity in Europe. Actor Rudolph Valentino performed the tango in his film The Four Horseman of the Apocalypse (1926), with Hollywood taking advantage of "[Valentino's] charisma, the magnetism of tango, and the attraction they both had on a huge public".

Other styles of music in Argentina include the chacarera, milonga, zamba and chamamé. Modern rhythms include cuarteto (music from the Cordoba Province) and electrotango. Argentine rock (known locally as rock nacional) was most popular during the 1980s, and remains one of Argentina's most popular music genres. Rock en español was first popular in Argentina, then swept through other Hispanic American countries and Spain. The movement was known as the "Argentine Wave".

=== Bolivia ===
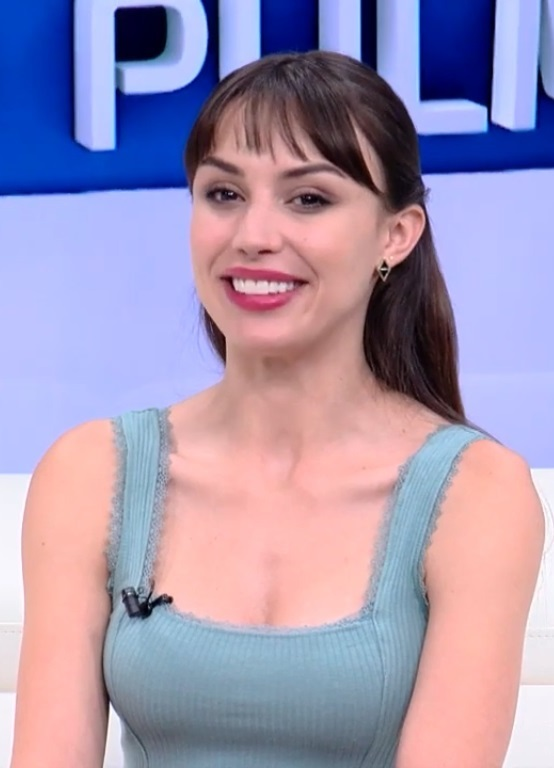
Claudia Arce

Bolivian music is perhaps the most strongly linked to its native population among the national styles of South America. After the nationalistic period of the 1950s Aymara and Quechuan culture became more widely accepted, and their folk music evolved into a more pop-like sound. Los Kjarkas played a pivotal role in this fusion. Other forms of native music (such as huayños and caporales) are also widely played. Cumbia is another popular genre. There are also lesser-known regional forms, such as the music from Santa Cruz and Tarija (where styles such as Cueca and Chacarera are popular).

=== Brazil ===
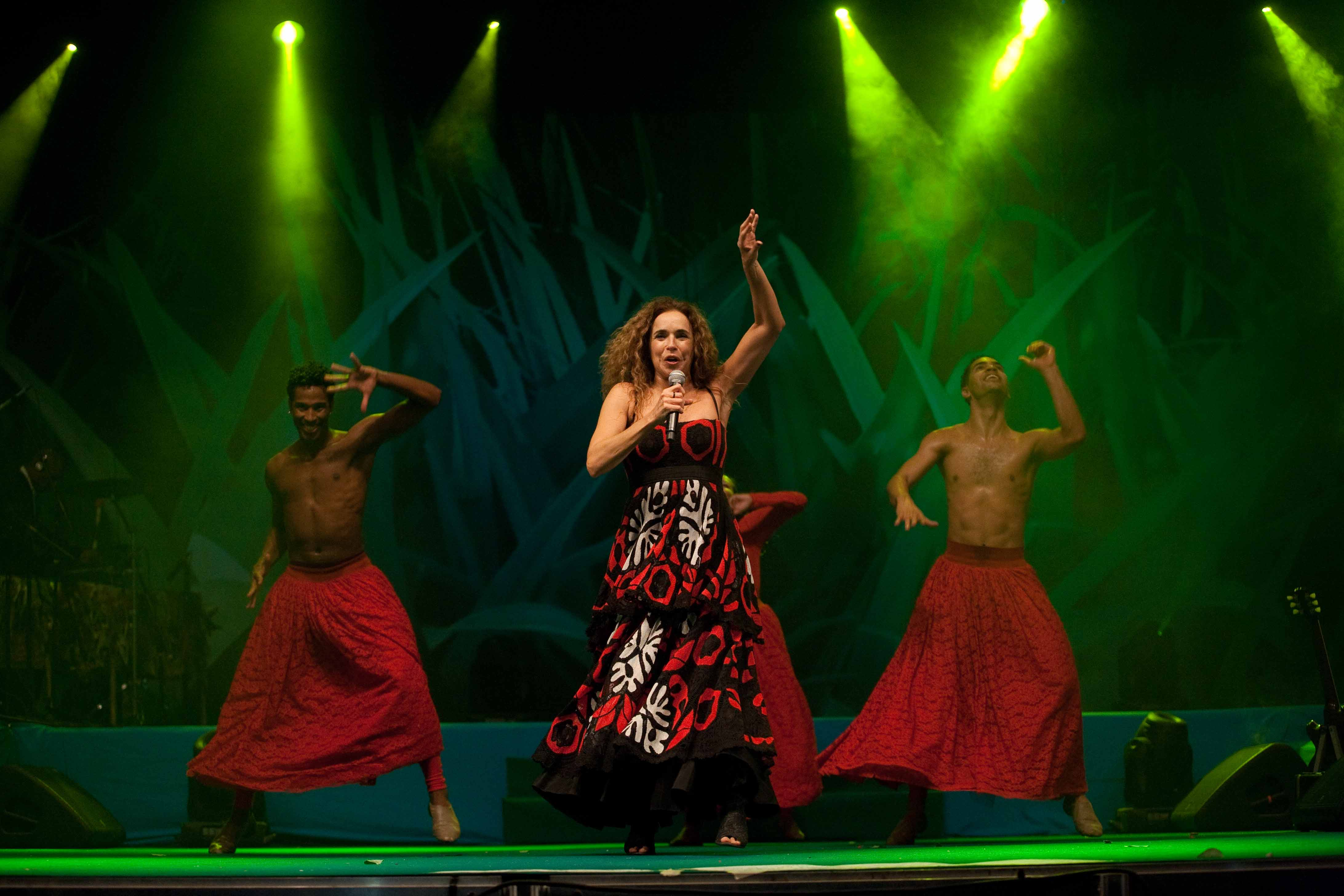
Daniela Mercury in 2010.

Atraente
Choro "Atraente", composed by Chiquinha Gonzaga, recorded by Pixinguinha (saxophone) and Benedito Lacerda (flute). Choro is a genre of Brazilian instrumental music

Brazil is a large, diverse country with a long history of popular-musical development, ranging from the early-20th-century innovation of samba to the modern Música popular brasileira. Bossa nova is internationally well-known, and Forró (pronounced [foˈʁɔ]) is also widely known and popular in Brazil. Lambada is influenced by rhythms like cumbia and merengue. Funk carioca (also known as Brazilian funk) is also a highly popular style, including tamborzão rhythms.

=== Chile ===
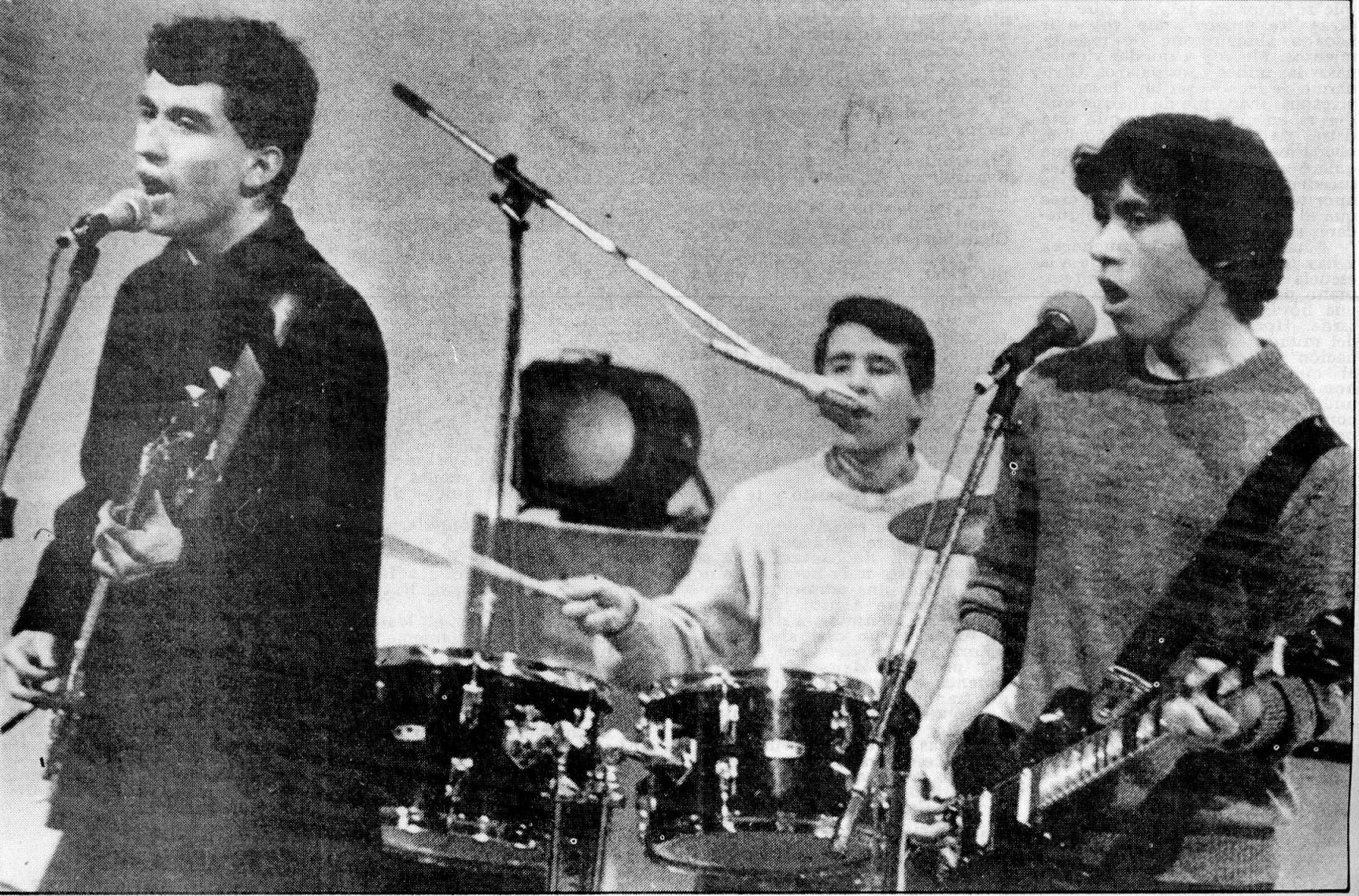
Los Prisioneros

Many musical genres are native to Chile; one of the most popular was the Chilean Romantic Cumbia, exemplified by artists such as Americo and Leo Rey. The Nueva Canción originated in the 1960s and 1970s and spread in popularity until the 1973 Chilean coup d'état, when most musicians were arrested, killed or exiled.

In Central Chile, several styles can be found: the Cueca (the national dance), the Tonada, the Refalosa, the Sajuriana, the Zapateado, the Cuando and the Vals. In the Norte Grande region traditional music resembles the music of southern Perú and western Bolivia, and is known as Andean music. This music, which reflects the spirit of the indigenous people of the Altiplano, was an inspiration for the Nueva canción. The Chiloé Archipelago has unique folk-music styles, due to its isolation from the culture centres of Santiago.

Music from Chilean Polynesia, Rapa Nui music, is derived from Polynesian culture rather than colonial society or European influences.

=== Costa Rica ===
The music of Costa Rica is represented by musical expressions as parrandera, the Tambito, waltz, bolero, gang, calypso, chiquichiqui, mento the run and callera. They emerged from the migration processes and historical exchanges between indigenous, European and African. Typical instruments are the quijongo, marimba, ocarinas, low drawer, the Sabak, reed flutes, accordion, mandolin and guitar.

=== Cuba ===
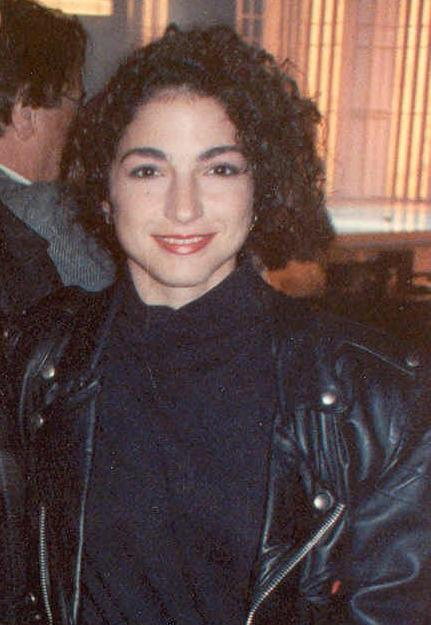
Gloria Estefan in 1990.

Cuba has produced many musical genres, and a number of musicians in a variety of styles. Blended styles range from the danzón to the rumba.

=== Colombia ===
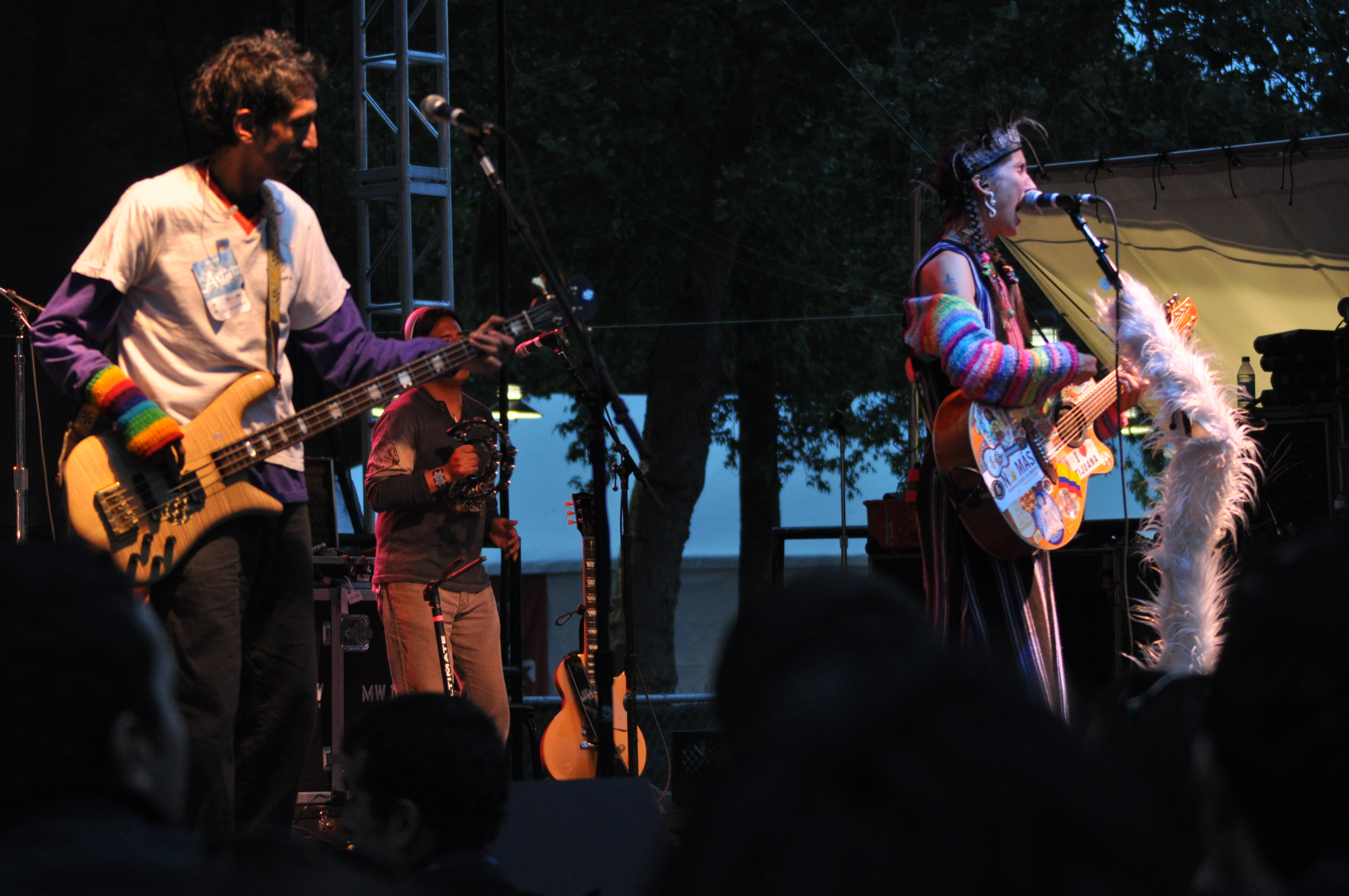
Aterciopelados play at Bumbershoot, Seattle Center, Seattle, Washington.

Colombian music can be divided into four musical zones: the Atlantic coast, the Pacific coast, the Andean region and Los Llanos. The Atlantic music features rhythms such as the cumbia, porros and mapalé. Music from the Pacific coast such features rhythms such as the currulao —which is tinged with Spanish influence— and the Jota chocoana (along with many more afro-drum predominating music forms)—tinged with African and Aboriginal influence. Colombian Andean has been strongly influenced by Spanish rhythms and instruments, and differs noticeably from the indigenous music of Peru or Bolivia. Typical forms include the bambuco, pasillo guabina and torbellino, played with pianos and string instruments such as the tiple guitarra. The music of Los Llanos, música llanera, is usually accompanied by a harp, a cuatro (a type of four-string guitar) and maracas. It has much in common with the music of the Venezuelan Llanos.

Apart from these traditional forms, two newer musical styles have conquered large parts of the country: la salsa, which has spread throughout the Pacific coast and the vallenato, which originated in La Guajira and César (on the northern Caribbean coast). The latter is based on European accordion music. Merengue music is heard as well. More recently, musical styles such as reggaeton and bachata have also become popular.

=== Dominican Republic ===
Merengue típico and Orchestra merengue have been popular in the Dominican Republic for many decades, and is widely regarded as the national music. Bachata is more recent arrival, arriving in the first half of the 20th century, taking influences from the bolero and derived from the country's rural guitar music. Bachata has evolved and risen in popularity over the last 40 years in the Dominican Republic and other areas (such as Puerto Rico) with the help of artists such as Antony Santos, Luis Segura, Luis Vargas, Teodoro Reyes, Yoskar Sarante, Alex Bueno, and Aventura. Bachata, merengue and salsa are now equally popular among Spanish-speaking Caribbean people. When the Spanish conquistadors sailed across the Atlantic they brought with them a type of music known as hesparo, which contributed to the development of Dominican music. A romantic style is also popular in the Dominican Republic from vocalists such as Angela Carrasco, Anthony Rios, Maridalia Hernandez and Olga Lara. Reggaeton is currently one of the most popular genres coming out of the Dominican Republic. It has been recently popularized in night clubs with these high beats. This was made by the help of Dominican artist El Alfa. El Alfa has made "dembow" one of the most popular types of reggaeton. He has been able to produce highly played songs that are played in multiple countries.

=== Ecuador ===
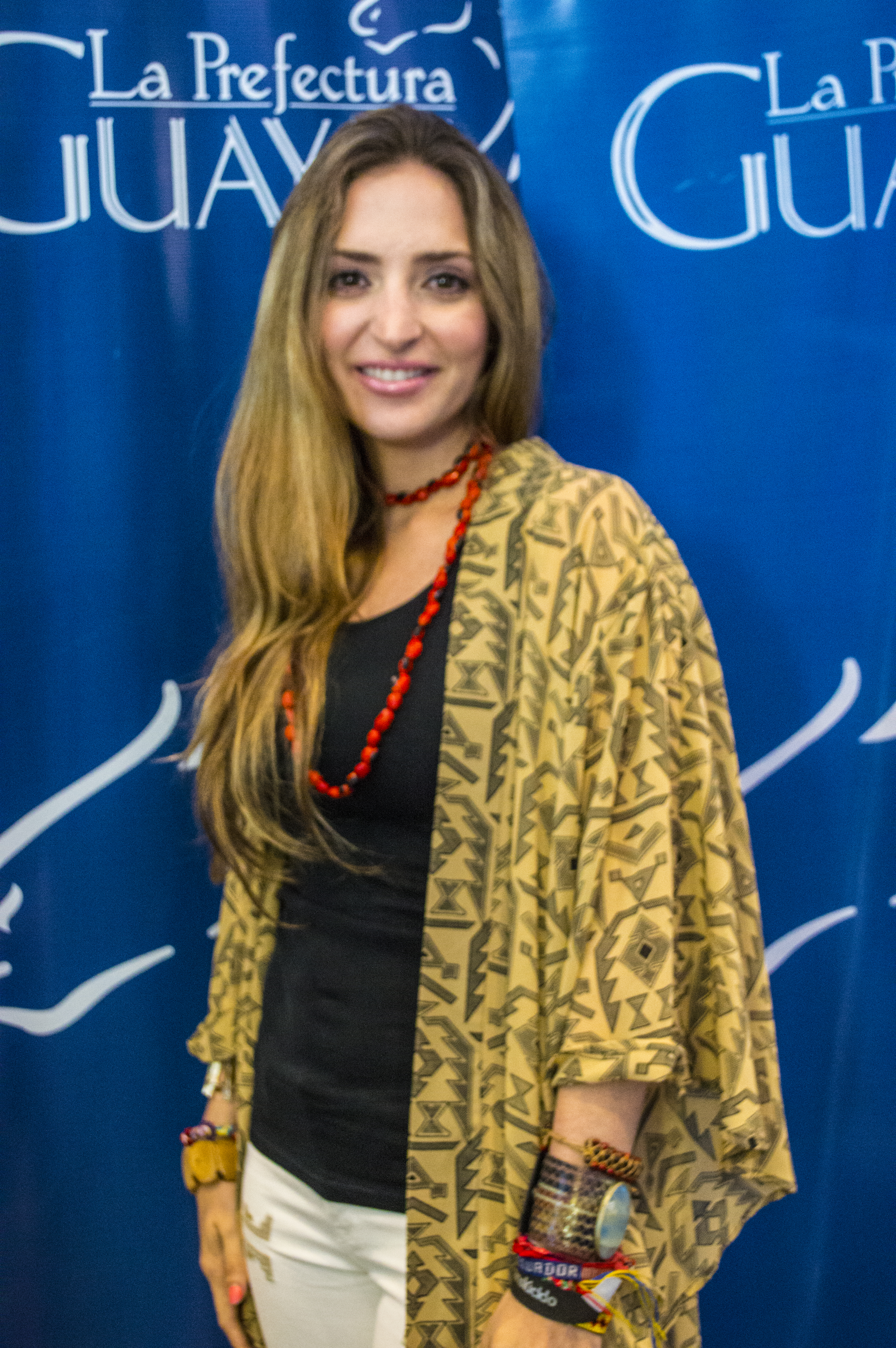
Mirella Cesa

Traditional Ecuadorian music can be classified as mestizo, Indian and Afro-Ecuadorian music. Mestizo music evolved from the interrelation between Spanish and Indian music. It has rhythms such as pasacalles, pasillos, albazos and sanjuanitos, and is usually played by stringed instruments. There are also regional variations: coastal styles, such as vals (similar to Vals Peruano (Waltz)) and montubio music (from the coastal hill country).

Indian music in Ecuador is determined in varying degrees by the influence of quichua culture. Within it are sanjuanitos (different from the mestizo sanjuanito), capishkas, danzantes and yaravis. Non-quichua indigenous music ranges from the Tsáchila music of Santo Domingo (influenced by the neighboring Afro-marimba) to the Amazonian music of groups such as the Shuar.

Black Ecuadorian music can be classified into two main forms. The first type is black music from the coastal Esmeraldas province, and is characterized by the marimba. The second variety is black music from the Chota Valley in the northern Sierra (primarily known as Bomba del Chota), characterized by a more-pronounced mestizo and Indian influence than marimba esmeraldeña. Most of these musical styles are also played by wind ensembles of varying sizes at popular festivals around the country. Like other Latin American countries, Ecuadorian music includes local exponents of international styles: from opera, salsa and rock to cumbia, thrash metal and jazz.

=== El Salvador ===
Karla Cubias

Salvadoran music may be compared with the Colombian style of music known as cumbia. Popular styles in modern El Salvador (in addition to cumbia) are salsa, Bachata and Reggaeton. "Political chaos tore the country apart in the early 20th century, and music was often suppressed, especially those with strong native influences. In the 1940s, for example, it was decreed that a dance called "Xuc" was to be the "national dance" which was created and led by Paquito Palaviccini's and his Orquestra Internacional Polio". In recent years reggaeton and hip hop have gained popularity, led by groups such as Pescozada and Mecate. Salvadorian music has a musical style influenced by Mayan music (played on the El Salvador-Guatemala border, in Chalatenango). Another popular style of music not native to El Salvador is known as Punta a Honduran style.

Some of the leading classical composers from El Salvador include Alex Panamá, Carlos Colón-Quintana, and German Cáceres.

=== Guatemala ===
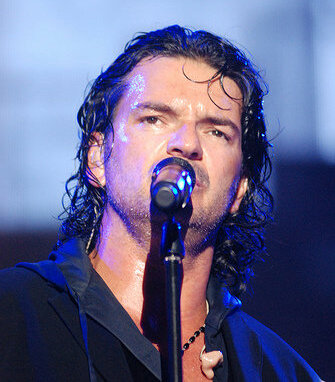
Ricardo Arjona

Guatemala has a very extensive musical history, from Mayan music to modern-day acts such as Ricardo Arjona. They have a diverse range of music. Popular music in Guatemala usually consists of Marimba music. Which incorporates the Marimba keyboard percussion instrument of Central African origins, when it was first brought originally by enslaved Africans to Central America and the Caribbean.

=== Honduras ===
The music of Honduras varies from Punta and Paranda (Traditional music from Honduras) to Caribbean and Central American music such as salsa, merengue, reggae, reggaeton, Dancehall. The country's old capital of Comayagua is an important center for modern Honduran music, and is home to the College for Fine Arts.

=== Mexico ===
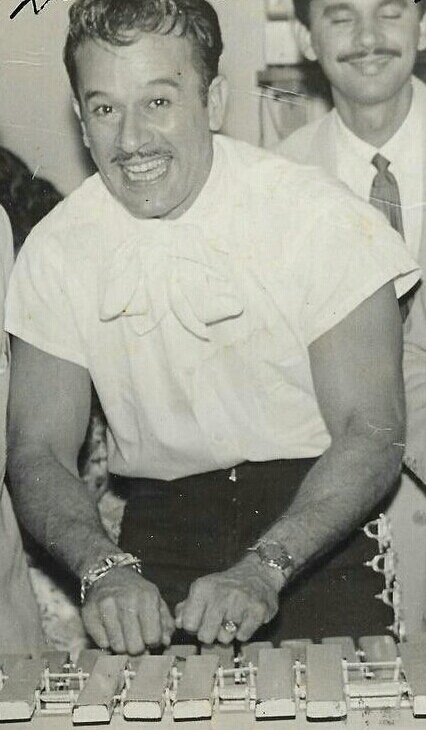
Pedro Infante

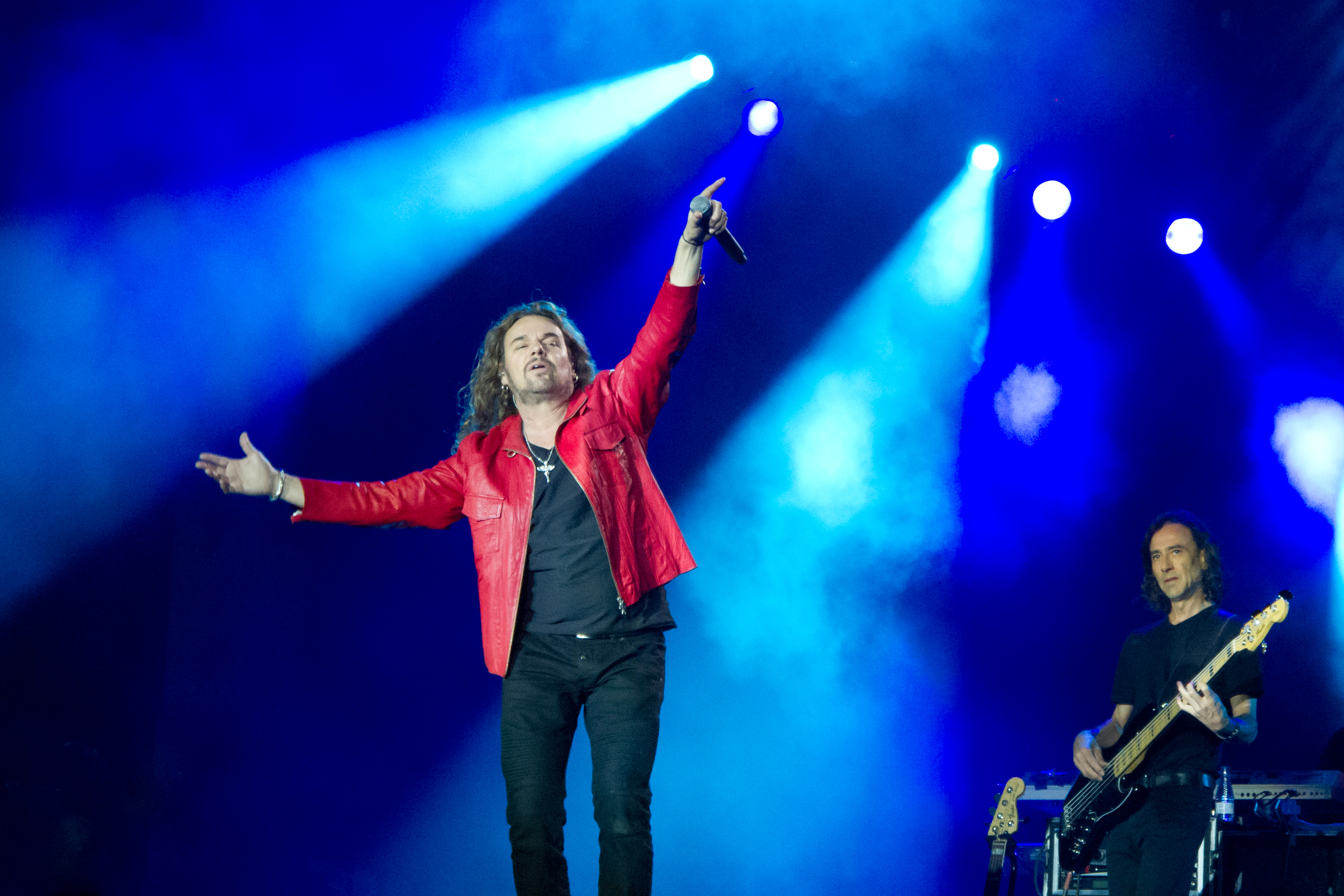
Maná in concert in Rock in Rio in Madrid in 2012.

Mexico is perhaps one of the most musically diverse countries in the world. Each of its 31 states, its capital city and each of Mexico City's boroughs claim unique styles of music. The most representative genre is mariachi music or traditional regional music corridos. Although commonly misportrayed as buskers, mariachis musicians play extremely technical, structured music or blends such as jarabe. Most mariachi music is sung in verses of prose poetry. Ranchera, Mexico's country music, differs from mariachi in that it is less technical and its lyrics are not sung in prose. Other regional music includes: son jarocho, son huasteco, cumbia sonidera, Mexican pop, rock en español, Mexican rock and canto nuevo. There is also music based on sounds made by dancing (such as the zapateada).

Northeastern Mexico is home to another popular style called norteña, which assimilates Mexican ranchera with Colombian cumbia and is typically played with Bavarian accordions and Bohemian polka influence. One of the most popular music styles in all Mexico are "corridos". This is regional mexican music and recently been popularized by famous artist such as Peso Pluma and Grupo Frontera. These folk tales consist of money and love. Poetry backed up instrumentals of the guitar and trumpet. It has grown to be very popular in the United States. Variations of norteña include duranguense, tambora sinaloense, corridos and nortec (norteño-techno). The eastern part of the country makes heavy use of the harp, typical of the son arocho style. The music in southern Mexico is particularly represented by its use of the marimba, which has its origins in the Soconusco region between Mexico and Guatemala.

Vals Chiapa de Corzo performed on a marimba in Chiapas.

The north-central states have recently spawned a Tecktonik-style music, combining electro and other dance genres with more traditional music. Salsa (music) has also played an important role in Mexican music shown by Sonora Santanera. Currently, Reggaeton is very popular in modern Mexico.

=== Nicaragua ===
The most popular style of music in Nicaragua is palo de Mayo, which is both a type of dance music and a festival where the dance (and music) originated. Other popular music includes marimba, folklore, son nica, folk music, merengue, bachata and salsa.

=== Panama ===
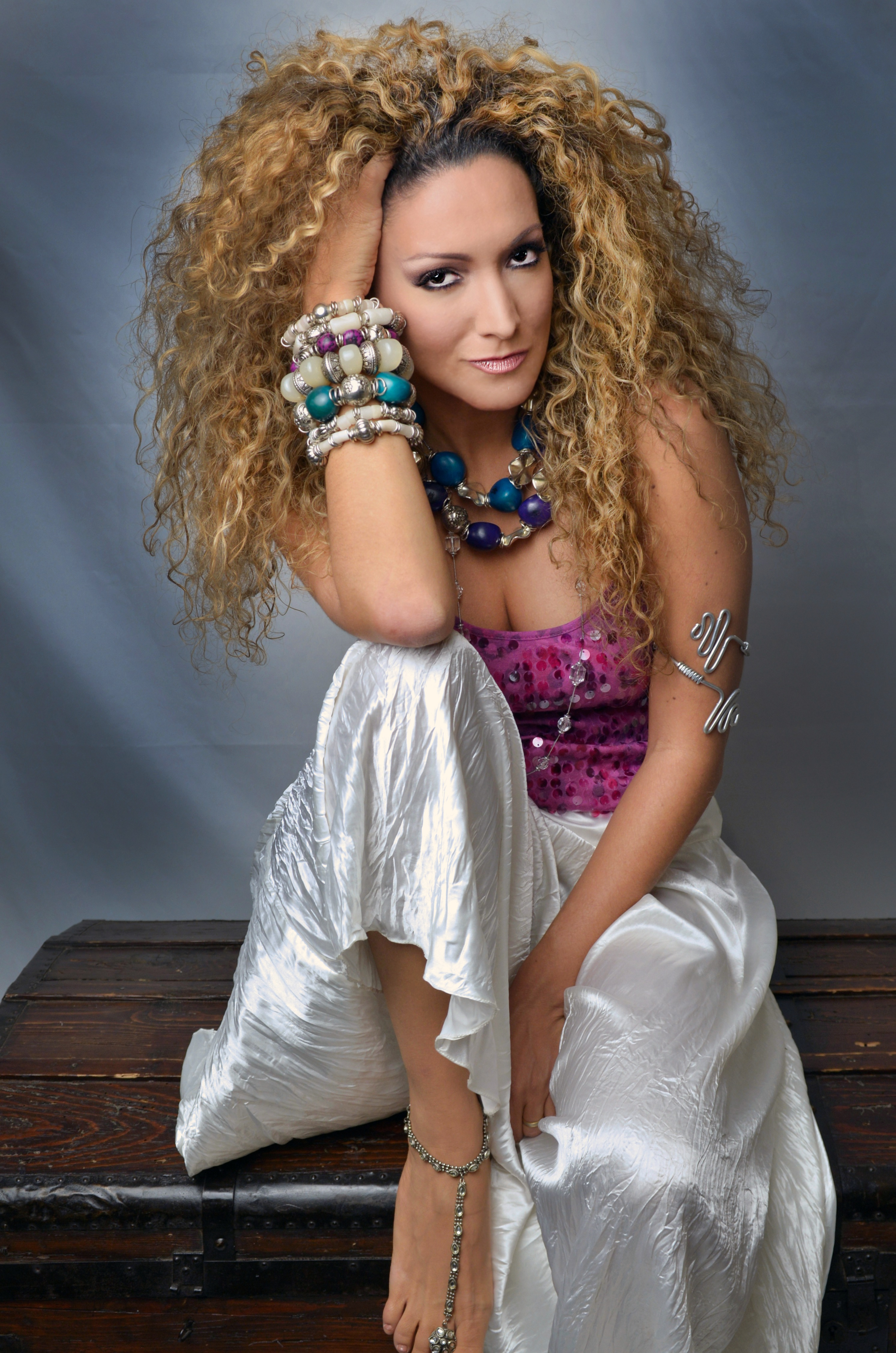
Erika Ender

The music of Panama is the result of the mestizaje. It has occurred during the last five hundred years between the Iberian traditions, especially those of Andalusia, American Indians and those of West Africa. Mestizaje that has been enriched by cultural exchange caused by several waves of migrations originating in Europe, in various parts of the Caribbean (mostly Barbados, Trinidad, Jamaica and Saint Lucia) in Asia and several points in South and North America. These migrations were due to the Spanish colonization of America, which was forced to use the Royal Route of Panama as an inter-oceanic trade route, which included the slave trade (an institution abolished in Panama in 1851); To the traffic, product of the exploitation of the silver mines in the Viceroyalty of Peru during centuries XVI and XVII; To the legendary riches of the Fair of Portobelo, between centuries XVII and XVIII; To the construction of the Transísmico Railroad, begun in 1850, and the Interoceanic Canal, initiated by France in 1879, concluded by the United States in 1914 and expanded by Panama from 2007.

With this cultural heritage, Panama has contributed to the development of Cumbia, Decima, Panamanian saloma, Pasillo, Panamanian bunde, bullerengue, Punto Music, Tamborito, Mejorana, Panamanian Murga, Tamborera (Examples: Guarare and Tambor de la Alegria), bolero, jazz, Salsa, reggae and calypso, through composers like Nicolas Aceves Núñez (hall, cumbia, tamborito, Pasillo), Luis Russell (jazz), Ricardo Fábrega (bolero and Tamborera), José Luis Rodríguez Vélez (cumbia and bolero), Arturo "Chino" Hassan (bolero), Nando Boom (reggae), Lord Cobra (calypso), Rubén Blades (salsa), Danilo Pérez (jazz), Vicente Gómez Gudiño (Pasillo), César Alcedo, among many others.

=== Paraguay ===
Paraguayan music depends largely upon two instruments: the guitar and the harp, which were brought by the conquistadors and found their own voices in the country. Polka Paraguaya, which adopted its name from the European dance, is the most popular type of music and has different versions (including the galopa, the krye’ÿ and the canción Paraguaya, or "Paraguayan song"). The first two are faster and more upbeat than a standard polka; the third is a bit slower and slightly melancholy. Other popular styles include the purahéi jahe’o and the compuesto (which tell sad, epic or love stories). The polka is usually based on poetic lyrics, but there are some emblematic pieces of Paraguayan music (such as "Pájaro Campana", or "Songbird", by Félix Pérez Cardozo).

Guarania is the second-best-known Paraguayan musical style, and was created by musician José Asunción Flores in 1925.

=== Peru ===
Example of a Huayno from the Huanca of the Junin Region of central Peru.

Peruvian music is made up of indigenous, Spanish and West African influences. Coastal Afro-Peruvian music is characterized by the use of the cajón peruano. Amerindian music varies according to region and ethnicity. The best-known Amerindian style is the huayno (also popular in Bolivia), played on instruments such as the charango and guitar. Mestizo music is varied and includes popular valses and marinera from the northern coast.

=== Puerto Rico ===
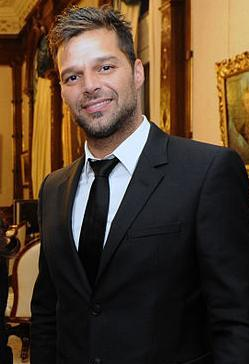
Ricky Martin

The history of music on the island of Puerto Rico begins with its original inhabitants, the Taínos. The Taíno Indians have influenced the Puerto Rican culture greatly, leaving behind important contributions such as their musical instruments, language, food, plant medicine and art. The heart of much Puerto Rican music is the idea of improvisation in both the music and the lyrics. A performance takes on an added dimension when the audience can anticipate the response of one performer to a difficult passage of music or clever lyrics created by another. When two singers, either both men or a man and a woman, engage in vocal competition in música jíbara this is a special type of seis called a controversia. Of all Puerto Rico's musical exports, the best-known is reggaeton. Bomba and plena have long been popular, while reggaetón is a relatively recent invention.

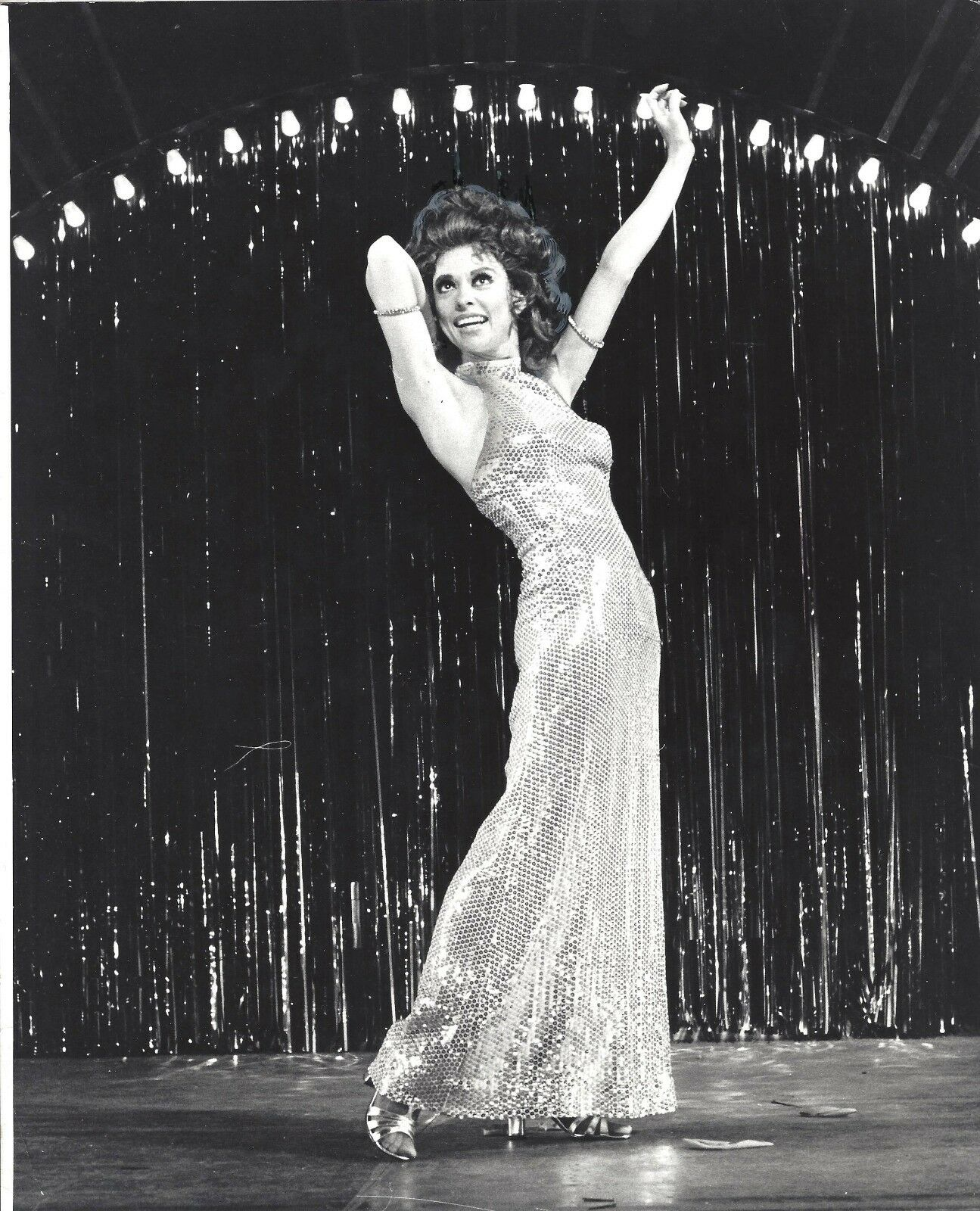
Rita Moreno in The Ritz in 1975

It is a form of urban contemporary music, often combining other Latin musical styles, Caribbean and West Indies music, (such as reggae, soca, Spanish reggae, salsa, merengue and bachata. It originates from Panamanian Reggae en Español and Jamaican dancehall, however received its rise to popularity through Puerto Rico.Tropikeo is the fusion of R&B, Rap, Hip Hop, Funk and Techno Music within a Tropical musical frame of salsa, in which the conga drums and/or timbales drums are the main source of rhythm of the tune, in conjunction with a heavy salsa "montuno" of the piano. The lyrics of the song can be rapped or sung, or used combining both styles, as well as danced in both styles. Aguinaldo from Puerto Rico is similar to Christmas carols, except that they are usually sung in a parranda, which is rather like a lively parade that moves from house to house in a neighborhood, looking for holiday food and drink. The melodies were subsequently used for the improvisational décima and seis. There are aguinaldos that are usually sung in churches or religious services, while there are aguinaldos that are more popular and are sung in the parrandas. Danza is a very sophisticated form of music that can be extremely varied in its expression; they can be either romantic or festive. Romantic danzas have four sections, beginning with an eight measure paseo followed by three themes of sixteen measures each. The third theme typically includes a solo by the bombardino and, often, a return to the first theme or a coda at the end. Festive danzas are free-form, with the only rules being an introduction and a swift rhythm. Plena is a narrative song from the coastal regions of Puerto Rico, especially around Ponce, Puerto Rico. Its origins have been various claimed as far back as 1875 and as late as 1920. As rural farmers moved to San Juan, Puerto Rico and other cities, they brought plena with them and eventually added horns and improvised call and response vocals. Lyrics generally deal with stories or current events, though some are light-hearted or humorous.

=== Uruguay ===
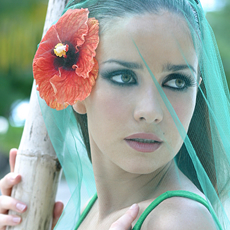
Natalia Oreiro in 2005

Uruguayan music has similar roots to that of Argentina. Uruguayan tango and milonga are both popular styles, and folk music from along the River Plate is indistinguishable from its Argentine counterpart. Uruguay rock and cancion popular (Uruguayan versions of rock and pop music) are popular local forms. Candombe, a style of drumming descended from African slaves in the area, is quintessentially Uruguayan (although it is played to a lesser extent in Argentina). It is most popular in Montevideo, but may also be heard in a number of other cities. 21st. Century Uruguayan music is also heard internationally as part of the language of Uruguayan composers such as three-time Grammy nominated Miguel del Aguila

=== Venezuela ===
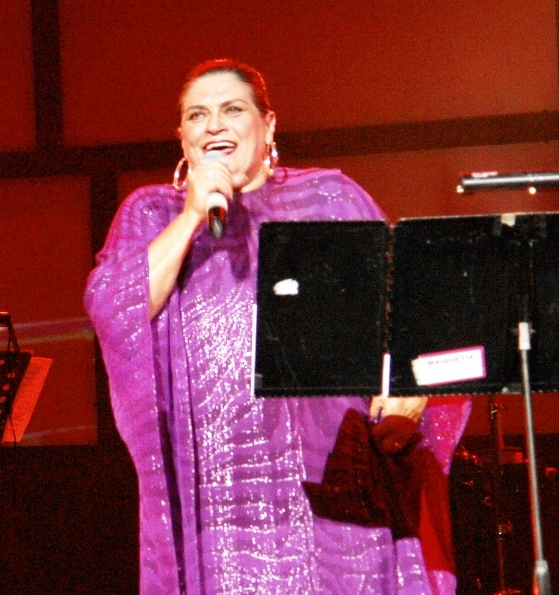
Soledad Bravo

The Joropo is Venezuelan popular music originating in the llanos plains, although a more upbeat and festive gaita version is heard western Venezuela (particularly in Zulia State). There are also African-influenced styles which emphasize drumming including multiple rhythms, such as sangueo, fulia, parranda, tamborera and calypso from the Guayana region (influenced by neighboring English-speaking countries). The Aguinaldo, conforms the national representation of the Venezuelan Christmas. In the east, the malagueña, punto and galerón accompanies the velorios de cruz de mayo, (religious tradition, that is celebrated on 3 May in honor to the Christian cross). In the Venezuelan Andes, the Venezuelan bambuco is a local variation of the bambuco. Other forms include the polo and the Venezuelan waltz. El merengue venezolano es una música bailable del siglo XX de Venezuela, con un característico ritmo atractivo. Es un género completamente diferente del merengue de la República Dominicana en cuanto a su ritmo, instrumentos, cultura e historia.

Venezuelan Merengue is also known by two other names: merengue caraqueño, relating its origin to the capital Caracas, and merengue rucaneao, in which reference to Rúcano, a mixture for a popular jelly dessert, is used as a simile for the sensual pelvic movements of its dance. Merengue came into vogue in Venezuela during the period from the 1920s to the 1940s. At first, merengue music was associated with the mabiles, popular drinking and dancing spots in Caracas, and with the capital's carnival celebrations in street parades and plazas. Later in the 1940s, it was absorbed into the dance halls of the upper classes, and also formed part of the repertoire of smaller groups such as the Cantores del Trópico, led by guitarist Antonio Lauro (who composed 'Merengue para guitarra') and composers such as Eduardo Serrano. The hybrid traditional ensembles of then and now that dedicate their program to folkloric program to arrangements of Venezuelan folk music - ensembles such as estudiantinas, Venezuelan Merengue. Nowadays it is always discussed whether merengue is written in 2/4, 6/8 or 5/8.

== Popular styles ==
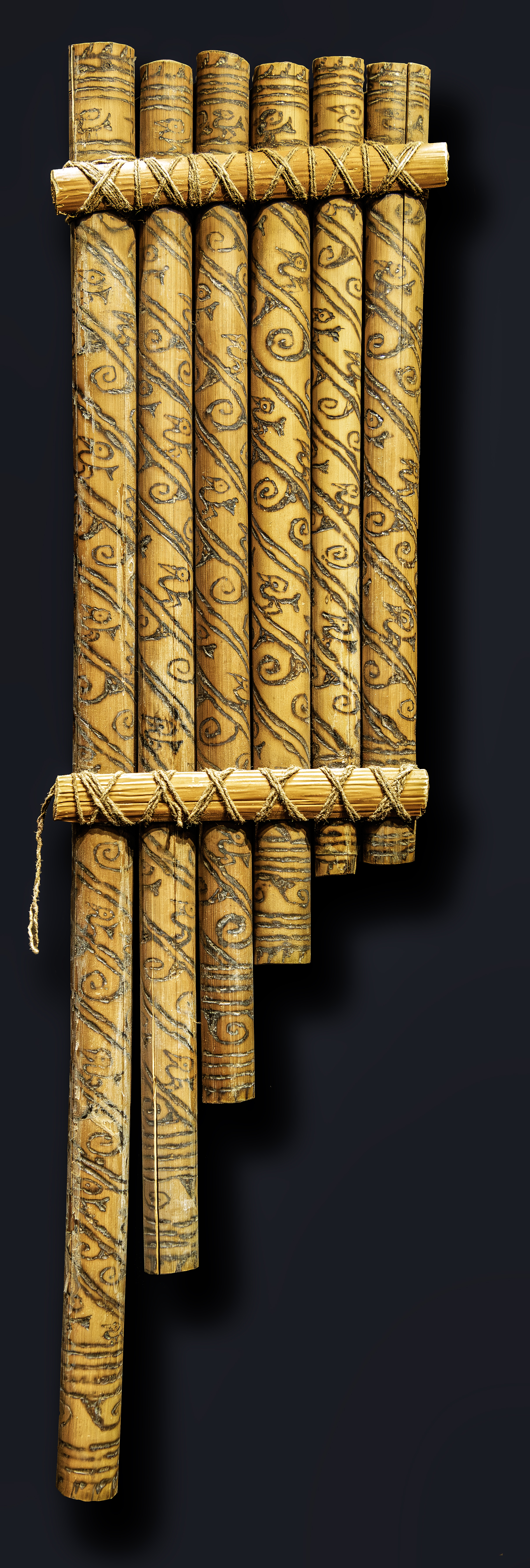
Zampoña, a type of Siku.

=== Salsa ===
Based on Cuban music in rhythm, tempo, bass line, riffs and instrumentation, Salsa represents an amalgamation of musical styles including rock, jazz, and other Latin American musical traditions. Modern salsa (as it became known worldwide) was forged in the pan-Latin melting pot of New York City in the late 1960s and early 1970s.

=== Latin trap ===
Latin trap has become famous around 2015. It has influences of American trap and reggaeton music.

=== Reggaetón ===
Reggaeton (also known as reggaetón and reguetón[1]) is a musical genre which originated in Puerto Rico during the 1990s as a result of the mixing Spanish Reggae and Spanish Hip-hop, which both stemmed from different countries. Spanish Reggae was a product of musical movements in Jamaica and Panama, while Spanish Hip-Hop was created by the influence of Hip-Hop in the U.S. at the time. Reggaeton was developed in areas of Public housing in Puerto Rico, known as "caserios," which were filled with urban poverty and criminal activity such as drug violence. Popular Reggaeton artists, such as Daddy Yankee, grew up in these "caserios," where their lyrics reflected life in the public housing developments and, in addition, experiences of racial exclusion in the country. These lyrics included themes surrounding sex and life in the streets, influenced by the environment in which it was developed.

Reggaeton is commonly created over a "boom-ch-boom-chick" beat known as "dembow." This beat originates from Jamaican dancehall and reggae music and was first used for a song titled "Dembow" by Jamaican musician Shabba Ranks. This beat was produced by Bobby "Digital" Dixon and has been used in the genre since the early 1990s. Since then, songs of the genre, in addition to Reggae and Hip-Hop, have incorporated beats from other latin genres such as Salsa, Bachata, Cumbia, and Merengue.

=== Latin ballad ===
The Latin (or romantic) ballad is a Latin musical genre which originated in the 1960s. This ballad is very popular in Hispanic America and Spain, and is characterized by a sensitive rhythm. A descendant of the bolero, it has several variants (such as salsa and cumbia). Since the mid-20th century a number of artists have popularized the genre, such as Julio Iglesias, Luis Miguel, Enrique Iglesias, Alejandra Ávalos, Cristian Castro, Franco de Vita and José José.

== See also ==
- Los 600 de Latinoamérica – List of Latin American music albums
- Music and society in the Spanish Colonial Americas
- Opera in Latin America
