= Music of Panama =

Music of Panama Topics
Cumbia	Mejorana
Saloma	Pasillo
Danza	Contradanza
Tamborito	Torrente
Bolero	Salsa
Merengue	Rock
Compas	Calypso
Reggae en Español	Reggaeton
Típico	Mambo
Jazz	Latin Jazz
Pindín
Punto	Timeline and Samples
Central American music
Belize - Costa Rica - El Salvador - Guatemala - Honduras - Nicaragua - Panama

Panama is a Central American country, inhabited mostly by mestizos (persons of mixed African, European and indigenous ancestry). The music of Panama is heavily based on the folk music of Spain, particularly that of Andalusia and was influenced first by the indigenous populations of Guna, Teribes, Ngobe Bugle and others, and then by the black population who were brought over, first as slaves from Africa, between the 16th century and the 19th century, and then voluntarily (especially from Jamaica, Trinidad and Tobago, Barbados, Martinique, Guadeloupe, Dominica, Saint Lucia) to work on the Panamanian Railroad and Canal projects between the 1840s and 1914.

With this heritage, Panama has a rich and diverse music history, and important contributions to cumbia, saloma, pasillo, punto, tamborito, mejorana, bolero, jazz, salsa, reggae, calypso, rock, and other musical genres.

== Saloma and Mejorana ==
The saloma and mejorana feature a distinctive vocal style said to derive from Sevillians. The most important native instruments used to play these musics are the mejoranera, a five-stringed guitar accompanying songs called mejoranas as well as torrentes, and the rabel, a violin with three strings used to play cumbias, puntos and pasillos in the central provinces of Coclé, Herrera, Los Santos and Veraguas.

== Cumbia ==
Closely related to its more well-known Colombian cousin, Panamanian cumbia, especially amanojá and atravesao styles, are domestically popular. Another important music is punto and the salon dances like pasillo, danza and contradanza. During the 19th and 20th centuries, the Pasillo music was very popular.

== Tamborito ==
A folk dance, called tamborito is very popular. Danced by men and women in costumes, the tamborito is led by a cantalante, a female lead singer, who is backed by a clapping chorus (the "estribillo") that sings four-line stanzas of copla (a lyrical form related to Spanish poetry) as well as three drums.

== Congo ==
A somewhat similar genre called congo is popular among the black communities of the northern coast in Costa Arriba, which includes Portobelo, a province of Colón.

== Tipico ==
Contemporary popular Panama folkloric music is generally called música típico, or pindín, which since the 1940s has included instruments such as the guiro, conga and especially the accordion, among others. Some famous Panamanian artists in this genre are Aceves Nunez, Teresín Jaén, Ulpiano Vergara, Lucho De Sedas y Juan De Sedas, Dorindo Cárdenas, Victorio Vergara Batista, Roberto "Papi" Brandao, Nenito Vargas, Yin Carrizo, Abdiel Núñez, Manuel de Jesús Abrego, Alejandro Torres and Samy y Sandra Sandoval.

== Salsa ==
Panama's leading salsa musician, Rubén Blades, has achieved international stardom, after collaborating with other local musicians like Rómulo Castro and Tuira. Other world-famous musicians from Panama included Luis Russell, who played with Louie Armstrong in the 1920s, Mauricio Smith, a noted saxophone and flute player who played with Chubby Checker, Charles Mingus, Dizzy Gillespie, Machito and Mongo Santamaría, among others. Victor "Vitin" Paz, a pillar of the Latin jazz trumpet, was a cornerstone of the Fania All Stars for many years. Gaitanes, La Kshamba, Roberto Delgado and many others.

== Jazz ==
Panama has a long history in jazz, beginning with Luis Russell, pianist, composer and director, who traveled to New Orleans in 1919 and made important contributions. By the 1940s the port city of Colón boasted at least ten local jazz orchestras. Legends of Jazz in Panama included pianist and composer Victor Boa, bassist Clarence Martin, singer Barbara Wilson and French horn player John "Rubberlegs" McKindo. This jazz legacy was recently reinvigorated when the US-based Panamanian pianist Danilo Perez organized the first jazz Festival in January 2004.

== Calypso ==
Panama also boasts a vibrant history of calypso and mento music sung by nationally well-known musicians such as Lord Panama, Lord Delicious, Two-Gun Smokey, Lady Trixie, Lord Kon-Tiki, Lord Kitti, and Lord Cobra and the Pana-Afro sounds.

== Modern times ==
By the 1960s, local doo-wop groups were evolving into what became known as the Combos Nacionales, five to ten musician groups using electric instruments and incorporating the diverse sounds of jazz, calypso, salsa, merengue, doo wop, soul and funk. Famous Combos Nacionales included The Silvertones, The Exciters, The Fabulous Festivals, The Beachers, The Soul Fantastics, Los Mozambiques, The Goombays, Los Juveniles, Roberto y su Zafra and Bush y sus Magnificos. By 1970, the dynamic Combos Nacionales sound dominated Panamanian popular music, only winding down toward the late 1970s.

Reggae en Español originated in Panama, known as Spanish reggae is very popular among youth, and spawned the Spanish language dancehall also known as reggae en español (Spanish dancehall) style known as the predecessor to reggaeton, which originated with such artists as El General, Nando Boom, Renato, Mr. Rico, Aldo Ranks, Kafu Banton,Japanese, Jam & Suppose, Danger Man and Chicho Man, before becoming popular in Puerto Rico, the Dominican Republic and eventually amongst youth in the United States. As of 2006, Panama has become a major source and contributor to reggaeton and, especially as Reggaeton from Panama is on the rise and continues to dominate charts in the United States and abroad.

The Pioneers of the International Reggae en Espanol movement out of Panama were Gary H. Mason aka: Big Daddy G., and Luis "Wicho" Phillips aka: The Karma Master. They introduced and produced the songs "El Meneaito" performed by Gaby, "Soy El Mas Sensual" performed by Renato, "Camión Lleno de Gunn" performed by Jam & Suppose, "El Marciano" performed by Cocoman, as well as hits by Reggae Sam, Aldo Ranks, Toby King, Reggae Kid, and many other well known Panamanian Artists.

While often still referred as Reggae, much of the current Panamanian reggae scene is based in Jamaica's dancehall scene. The genre still maintains some of the style of the earlier reggae en Español, such as the laidback lyrics and references to everyday life, but some details, like the common practice of taking Jamaican dancehall songs (or even non-dancehall songs, as the case of Benny Benassi's Satisfaction) and releasing them with Spanish lyrics but otherwise minor to no differences with the original track, is now often criticized as plagiarism, mainly due to Internet, which has allowed people to have more awareness about a song's origins.

One of such artists to often face said criticism is Japanese, who tends to release songs based on viral hits like Gangnam Style or "Moving like Bernie" (a song involving the "Bernie dance" dance moves), or popular songs like Wiggle. This criticism, however, is mostly related to what some people consider "uninspired lyrics". Some speculate that the plagiarism issue is what keeps Panamanian and Jamaican dancehall scenes rarely colliding in the form of music collaborations, despite the closeness of both cultures.

Parallel to this, reggae influences in Panama have also spawned several popular reggae roots bands, such as Cellula, Pureza Natural, Raices y Cultura, Inspiración Mística, Panta Rey, among others. While reggae entered the country through Antillian immigrants, it has reached all sorts of people, like Mestizo singer from Coclé I-Nesta, who has experimented with traditional reggae roots, dancehall and even reggae fusion, and has collaborated with Argentinian reggae singer Fidel Nadal. Reggae roots remains popular among Panamanian youth of different regions, classes and races, specially among Rastas and secular weed subculture.

A thriving and very popular rock en español scene has produced such groups as Orquesta Garash, Radicales Libres, Filtro Medusa, Skamilonga, Los Rabanes, Xantos Jorge, Cage 9, Factor VIII, Os Almirantes, Nervial, Los 33, Señor Loop, Roba Morena, Out-reazon, Lemmiwinks, Skraped Knees, Calibre 57, ROGAM, Cabeza De Martillo, just to name a few. Solo artists like Cienfue and Horacio Valdés have also proved popular.

In recent years, the Electronic Dance Music scene of Panama has flourished, not being restricted just to concerts by David Guetta or Tiësto, but having full-fledged electronic music festivals like The Day After, which have featured famous EDM acts like Afrojack, Nervo, Martin Garrix, W&W and the like. Some national electronic music producers have appeared; however, the development of the producer scene is at a much earlier stage than its fanbase, partly because of the country's music labels focus on dancehall and its subgenres. However, a well-known Dancehall producer from the country, Predikador, has had an experimental venture on electronic dance genres in his "2050" series of sequentially named tracks, which have drawn from the popular EDM genres at the time each track was made (namely, Dubstep and Big Room House).

Also worth mentioning is Pedro Altamiranda and his historically popular music spanning several generations and political moments. His songs have a comedic tone and are often satirical; some of which have been banned by leaders like Manuel Noriega. Despite this, his influence has persisted, and many popular phrases and slang used in Panama are lyrics from Altamiranda's songs.

== Artists ==
=== Composers ===
- Gonzalo Brenes, composer, Panamanian folk song collector, musicologist, and music educator
- Narciso Garay, classical, symphonic interpretations of Panama Folklore
- Nicholas Aceves Nunez, Cumbia, Panama Folklore, Pasillo.
- José Luis Rodríguez Vélez, cumbia, bolero, pasillo
- Carlos Eleta Almarán "Dartañan", bolero
- Rubén Blades, salsa
- Omar Alfanno, Salsa
- Erika Ender, Latin pop, salsa, reguetón, ballad
- Gaitanes, Latin pop, salsa, merengue, ballad
- Luis Russell, jazz, swing
- Danilo Perez, jazz
- Roque Cordero, classical
- Samuel Robles, classical
- Marina Saiz-Salazar, classical
- Mr.Rico reggae Dance hall
- Nando Boom, reggae
- El General, reggae
- Yamilka Pitre, Salsa

=== Music Directors ===
- Aurelio Escudero
- José Luis Rodríguez Vélez
- Armando Boza
- Luciano Muñóz
- Luis Russell
- Dino Nugent

=== Singers ===
- Aldo Ranks, reggae and reggaeton
- Apache Ness, reggae
- Mr. Rico, reggae Dance hall
- Eddy Lover, reggaeton
- Edwin Benitez, rock
- El Roockie, reggae and reggaeton
- Flex, reggaeton
- Gaitanes, salsa and tropical singers
- Joey Montana, reggaeton
- La Factoría, reggaeton
- Latin Fresh, hip hop, reggae and reggaeton
- Lorna, reggae and reggaeton
- Makano, reggaeton
- Mikk D'Wolff, rock
- Tony Moro, bolero, chachachá
- Barbara Wilson, jazz
- Sandra Sandoval, pindín
- Catalina "Catita" Carrasco, cumbia (d. 2012)
- Lucho De Sedas
- Omar Alfanno, Salsa
- Renato

=== Accordion ===
- Aceves Nunez
- Rogelio "Gelo" Córdoba
- Ulpiano Vergara
- Juan De Sedas
- Dorindo Cárdenas
- Victorio Vergara
- Yin Carrizo
- Samy Sandoval
- Osvaldo Ayala
- Ceferino Nieto
- Roberto "Fito" Espino
- Papi Brandao
- Alfredo Escudero
- Isaac de León

=== Trumpet ===
- Victor "Vitin" Paz

=== Mejoranera ===
- Juan Andrés Castillo
- Los Juglares del Dexas

=== Organist ===
- Luis "Lucho" Azcárraga
- Ismael "Chacho" De La Rosa
- Toby Muñoz
- Avelino Muñoz

=== Guitar ===
- Emiliano Pardo Tristán

=== Violin ===
- Samuel Ramos
- Clímaco Batista

=== Musical producers ===
- Predikador
- Rubén Blades
- Roberto Blades
- Gaitanes
- Herman (chispa) Lawson
- Dino Nugent
