= Punto =

Punto may refer to:

In music:

- Punto (Venezuela), a style of Venezuelan music
- Punto guajiro, a style of music of the Cuban countryside and its guajiros
- Punto music, a style of Panamanian music

In automobiles:

- Fiat Punto, supermini produced since 1993
- Fiat Grande Punto, third generation supermini produced from 2005

In people:

- Giovanni Punto (1746-1803), eighteenth century horn virtuoso
- Nick Punto (born 1977), American baseball player for the Boston Red Sox

== Unit ==
- Punto, Spanish customary units
