= Dorindo Cárdenas =

Panamanian musician and songwriter

- Also known as: El Poste de Macano Negro
- Born: Daniel Dorindo Cárdenas Gutiérrez; 14 February 1936 (age 89); Aguabuena, Panama
- Years active: 1950s–2010s
- Spouses: Eneida Cedeño; María Rosa Vergara

Daniel Dorindo Cárdenas Gutiérrez (born 1936), known as Dorindo Cárdenas, is a Panamanian musician and songwriter. He is particularly known for having founded and led the group Orgullo Santeño, and for his compositions "El Solitario" and "Decimoquinto Festival en Guararé".

== Biography ==
Cárdenas was born on 14 February 1936 in Aguabuena, Panama. As a child he learned violin from Clímaco Batista Díaz and Francisco "Chico Purio" Ramírez.

As a young man Cárdenas moved to Chiriquí with a group of friends calling themselves Paraíso Istmeño. There he started learning accordion and founded a musical group called the Águilas Istmeñas (Spanish for "isthmian eagles"), whose name changed in July 1957 to Orgullo Santeño (Spanish for "Santeño pride"). Orgullo Santeño's first single "Santiago de Los Anastacios"/"Pueblo Nuevo" was recorded in 1958.

Rogelio Córdoba was famous in Panama at the time Orgullo Santeño was formed, and was performing on the accordion accompanied by singer Eneida Cedeño. Cedeño came to sing with Orgullo Santeño, and she went on to wed Cárdenas and sang with him until the late 1990s.

Cárdenas wrote over 200 songs, and often toured in Panama and Colombia. He was still performing in 2014 but has since retired, and Orgullo Santeño is led by his son Adonis Cárdenas. In 2025 a street in Cárdenas' hometown Aguabuena was named after him.

=== Personal life ===
Cárdenas was married to Eneida Cedeño, and is currently married to María Rosa Vergara, with whom he has two children.

== Musical style and compositions ==
In 1988 Cárdenas wrote "El Solitario", which has been performed by Colombian Alfredo Gutiérrez as a vallenato, by El Gran Combo de Puerto Rico as a salsa, and by Panamanians Samy and Sandra Sandoval and Spaniard Enrique Bunbury.

Cárdenas' instrumental composition "Decimoquinto Festival en Guararé" was given lyrics by Alfredo Gutiérrez and became a hit when recorded by Los Corraleros de Majagual as "Festival en Guararé". The titular festival is the Festival de la Mejorana, which has taken place annually in Guararé since 1949.

Cárdenas has written over 200 songs, and other notable compositions of his include "Al Galope de mi Caballo" and "Olvidemos el Pasado".
