= List of number-one tropical songs of 2018 (Panama) =

This is a list of the tropical number-one songs of 2018 in Panama. The charts are published by Monitor Latino, based exclusively for tropical songs on airplay across radio stations in Panama using the Radio Tracking Data, LLC in real time. The chart week runs from Monday to Sunday.

== Chart history ==
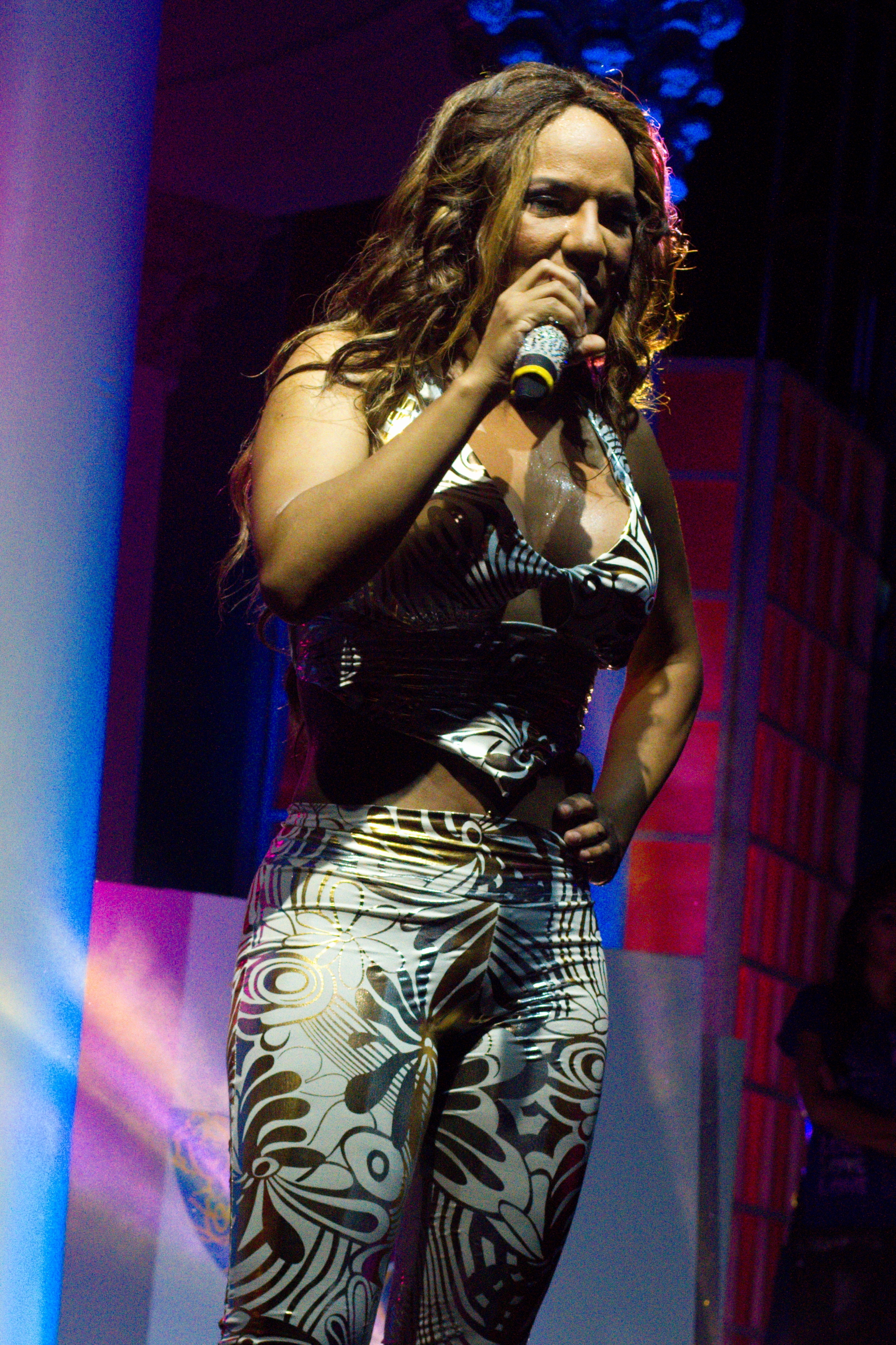
In 2018, Samy and Sandra Sandoval (pictured) scored four number-one hits on the Panamanian Tropical chart and spent a total of 36 weeks at number one. They also became the second act to replace themselves at number one, following Romeo Santos. They also surpassed Santos as the act with the most weeks at number one on the chart.

Though "Robarte un Beso" by Carlos Vives and Sebastián Yatra did not reach number one, it became the best-performing song of 2018 on the Panamanian Tropical chart.

Issue date	Song	Artist	Reference
1 January	"La Llamada de Mi Ex"	Chiquito Team Band	
8 January	"La Llamada de Mi Ex"	Chiquito Team Band	
15 January	"La Llamada de Mi Ex"	Chiquito Team Band	
22 January	"A Ella le Gusta el Hombre Viejo"	Samy and Sandra Sandoval	
29 January	"A Ella le Gusta el Hombre Viejo"	Samy and Sandra Sandoval	
5 February	"A Ella le Gusta el Hombre Viejo"	Samy and Sandra Sandoval	
12 February	"A Ella le Gusta el Hombre Viejo"	Samy and Sandra Sandoval	
19 February	"A Ella le Gusta el Hombre Viejo"	Samy and Sandra Sandoval	
26 February	"A Ella le Gusta el Hombre Viejo"	Samy and Sandra Sandoval	
5 March	"La Llamada de Mi Ex"	Chiquito Team Band	
12 March	"La Llamada de Mi Ex"	Chiquito Team Band	
19 March	"A Ella le Gusta el Hombre Viejo"	Samy and Sandra Sandoval	
26 March	"La Llamada de Mi Ex"	Chiquito Team Band	
2 April	"A Ella le Gusta el Hombre Viejo"	Samy and Sandra Sandoval	
9 April	"A Ella le Gusta el Hombre Viejo"	Samy and Sandra Sandoval	
16 April	"A Ella le Gusta el Hombre Viejo"	Samy and Sandra Sandoval	
23 April	"Sobredosis"	Romeo Santos featuring Ozuna	
30 April	"La Llamada de Mi Ex"	Chiquito Team Band	
7 May	"Si Te Deja el Tren"	Samy and Sandra Sandoval	
14 May	"Si Te Deja el Tren"	Samy and Sandra Sandoval	
21 May	"La Llamada de Mi Ex"	Chiquito Team Band	
28 May	"Si Te Deja el Tren"	Samy and Sandra Sandoval	
4 June	"Si Te Deja el Tren"	Samy and Sandra Sandoval	
11 June	"La Ex"	Samy and Sandra Sandoval	
18 June	"La Ex"	Samy and Sandra Sandoval	
25 June	"La Ex"	Samy and Sandra Sandoval	
2 July	"La Ex"	Samy and Sandra Sandoval	
9 July	"La Ex"	Samy and Sandra Sandoval	
16 July	"La Ex"	Samy and Sandra Sandoval	
23 July	"La Ex"	Samy and Sandra Sandoval	
30 July	"La Ex"	Samy and Sandra Sandoval	
6 August	"La Ex"	Samy and Sandra Sandoval	
13 August	"La Ex"	Samy and Sandra Sandoval	
20 August	"La Ex"	Samy and Sandra Sandoval	
27 August	"La Ex"	Samy and Sandra Sandoval	
3 September	"La Ex"	Samy and Sandra Sandoval	
10 September	"La Ex"	Samy and Sandra Sandoval	
17 September	"La Ex"	Samy and Sandra Sandoval	
24 September	"Justicia"	Silvestre Dangond featuring Natti Natasha	
1 October	"Justicia"	Silvestre Dangond featuring Natti Natasha	
8 October	"Justicia"	Silvestre Dangond featuring Natti Natasha	
15 October	"Justicia"	Silvestre Dangond featuring Natti Natasha	
22 October	"Justicia"	Silvestre Dangond featuring Natti Natasha	
29 October	"Justicia"	Silvestre Dangond featuring Natti Natasha	
5 November	"Justicia"	Silvestre Dangond featuring Natti Natasha	
12 November	"La Patrona"	Samy and Sandra Sandoval	
19 November	"La Patrona"	Samy and Sandra Sandoval	
26 November	"La Patrona"	Samy and Sandra Sandoval	
3 December	"La Patrona"	Samy and Sandra Sandoval	
10 December	"La Patrona"	Samy and Sandra Sandoval	
17 December	"Justicia"	Silvestre Dangond featuring Natti Natasha	
24 December	"La Patrona"	Samy and Sandra Sandoval	
31 December	"La Patrona"	Samy and Sandra Sandoval	
