= José Luis Rodríguez Vélez =

Panamanian composer, musical director, saxophonist, clarinetist and guitarist

José Luis Rodríguez Vélez (12 March 1915 in Santiago de Veraguas – 21 December 1984 in Ciudad de Panamá, Panamá) was a Panamanian composer, musical director, saxophonist, clarinetist and guitarist. He was the author of dozens of cumbias, boleros, pasillos, waltzes, dances and marches. He was a music teacher at the Escuela Normal Juan Demóstenes Arosemena, the Instituto Justo Arosemena, the Instituto Urracá, among others. He organized a music festival with bands and choirs, and music competitions. As a professional musician, he created and directed the Orquesta "El Patio", as well as choirs, other orchardestras and musical groups in Panamá.

For a life dedicated to education, the Panamanian Government conferred on him the Order of Manuel José Hurtado in 1975, the most important award in the Republic of Panamá for an educator or an education institution.

== Selected compositions ==
- Parque de Santiago, Bolero.
- Ansiedad de ti, Bolero.
- Encrucijada de amor, Bolero.
- Eres tú para mí, Bolero.
- Mientras exista Dios, Bolero.
- Estoy triste, muy triste, Ritmic Bolero.
- Plegaria al Señor, Ritmic Bolero.
- Aida y Aurita, Pasillo.
- Tristeza, Pasillo Song.
- Eva, Pasillo.
- Amanecer en el campo, Choral Saloma.
- Canto a mi madre buena, Choral.
- Motivos panameños, Danzón.
- Si tu me quisieras (also known as Cumbia Santiagueña), Cumbia.
- Dime otra vez que sí, Cumbia.
- La tinajita, Cumbia.
- Muchachita, Cumbia.
- Por el caminito, Cumbia.
- Urracá, March.
- Convivencia estudiantil, March.
- Despedida de la escuela, Vals.
- Tus quince años, Vals.
- Los niños de América cantan, Song.
- Duérmete mi bien, Lullaby.
