= Pedro Altamiranda =

Panamanian singer and composer (1935–2024)

Pedro Altamiranda Félez
- Also known as: Pedrito
- Born: 30 November 1935
- Origin: Panama
- Died: 7 March 2024 (aged 88)
- Genres: Panamanian music, Salsa, Calypso
- Years active: 1979—2024

Pedro Altamiranda Félez (30 November 1935 – 7 March 2024) was a Panamanian singer and composer known for his Carnival songs. Altamiranda sang about the culture and politics of Panama using humorous Panamanian slang. This attracted the attention of crowds, not only of adults but also young people who identified with his songs. Gilberto Santa Rosa, in his song "Navidad En Panamá", mentions Altamiranda as part of Panamanian culture.

Altamiranda started writing songs in 1979. Many of his political songs have been controversial, some of them censored by different governments including the Manuel Noriega dictatorship. In 1984 the song "Lecciones" was censored because it was about the electoral fraud that year. With his burlesque songs, he attacked the oppression of Panamanians. In February 2004, one week before Carnival, Altamiranda released the controversial "La Doña", a satire of Mireya Moscoso.

Most of his songs were influenced by Calypso music, salsa, and the Carnival Brass and Drum bands of Las Tablas, also known as Murgas.

Altamiranda also composed a song about the former President of Panama, Martín Torrijos, named "Catín le dijo a Martín" (Catin told Martin), which talked about how the President and the Finance Minister supposedly planned the new controversial tax law.

Some phrases in Pedro's songs, have become part of the Panamanian culture, among them:

- "...Para las Tablas to Rass"
- "...Nos Vemos en las Cómicas"
- "...Juega Vivo!"
- "...Guaro y Campana"

== Death ==
Altamiranda died on 7 March 2024, at the age of 88.

== See also ==
- List of Panamanians
