= Cumbia (Panama) =

Folkloric genre and dance from Panama

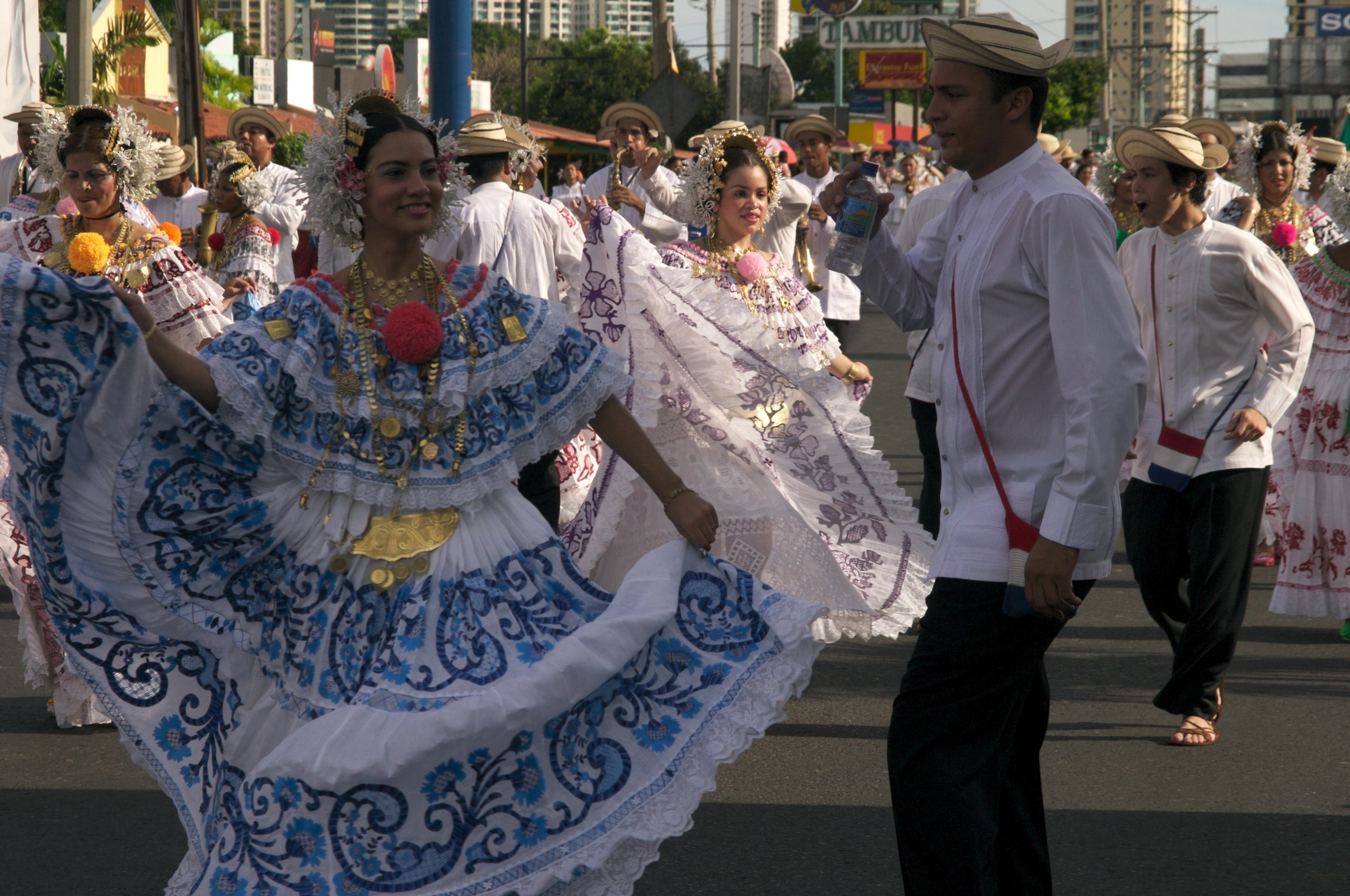
- Stylistic origins: Indigenous American music; African music; European music
- Cultural origins: Panama
- Typical instruments: maracas; diatonic button accordion; guachara; violin; caja santeña; tambor repicador; tambor pujador; tambor cumbiero; churuca; triangle; guitar; mejorana

Cumbia [ˈkumbja] is a musical genre and folk dance from Panama.

The cultural importance of cumbia has been recognized by UNESCO in its inclusion of it on the Representative List of the Intangible Cultural Heritage of Humanity in 2018. The inscription describes cumbia as "the festive and ritual expressions of the Congo culture [Afro-Panamanian culture] (Note: According to the UNESCO citation: "The ritual and festive expressions of the Congo culture encompass the contemporary vision of a collective celebration of the black rebel descendants enslaved during the colonial period." Reference to "Congo" culture is to Afro-Panamanian culture generally, and as a legacy of Maroon and Cimarron history in particular.) of Panama".

== Etymology ==
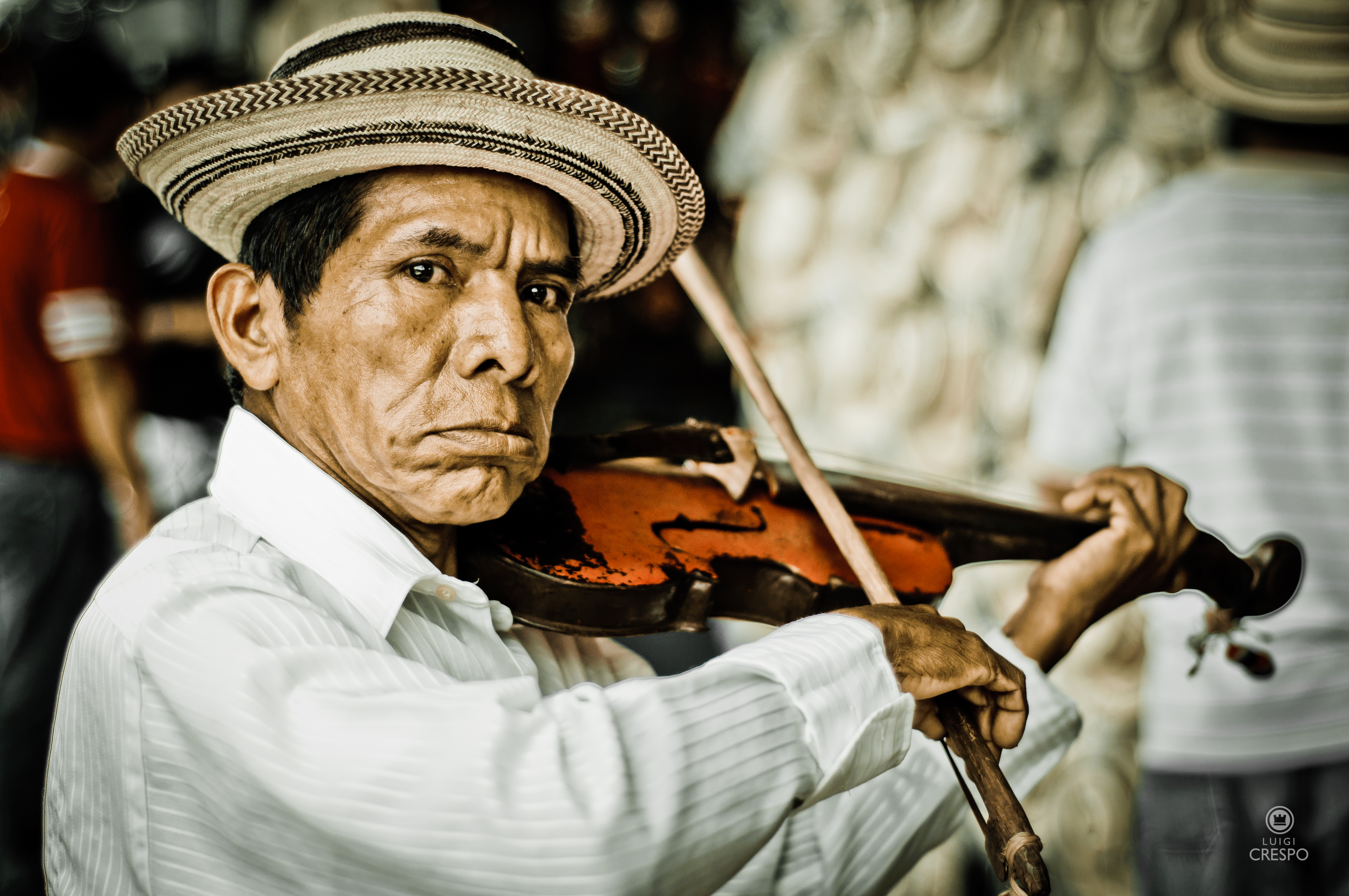
Panamanian musician playing folkloric cumbia.

Panamanian musician Narciso Garay, in his book "Tradiciones y Cantares de Panamá", published in 1930, assumed that the word cumbia shares the same linguistic root of the word cumbé, dance of African origin registered in the dictionary of the Spanish language as dance of black people

Colombian folklorist Delia Zapata Olivella in her publication of 1962, La Cumbia: Síntesis Musical de la Nación Colombiana, Reseña Histórica y Coreográfica ('Cumbia: Musical Synthesis of the Colombian Nation, Historical and Choreographic Review') notes that the only word similar to cumbia present in the dictionary of the Real Academia de la Lengua Española, is cumbé "a dance of African origin and the musical interpretation of this dance." And that cumbes (without acute accent) is used for black people living in Bata, in Spanish continental Guinea (now Equatorial Guinea).

The Colombian cultural researcher Jorge Villarreal Diazgranados in his article "La cumbia, el jolgorio y sobre todo el placer" (La cumbia, fun and above all pleasure), published in 1977 states:

Cumbia viene de Cumbague y Cumbague era la personificación del cacique indígena pocabuyano, se dice que Cumbague además de tener un carácter belicoso y audaz, debía ser un excelente bebedor de maco (chicha) porque todos los de su raza eran muy borrachos y amigos del baile y la juerga.

An English translation of the quote above would be:

Cumbia comes from Cumbague and Cumbague was the personification of the indigenous cacique pocabuyano, it is said that Cumbague besides having a bellicose and bold character, should have been an excellent maco (chicha) drinker because all of his race were drunks who danced and played among friends.

Musicologist and folk-researcher Guillermo Abadía Morales, in his 1977 "Compendio general de folclore colombiano" (General Compendium of Colombian folklore), says that cumbia is a shortened form of cumbancha, a word whose root is Kumba, Mandinka demonym, and adds that the Republic of the Congo was called Cumba.

Cuban ethnologist Graciano states that the words Kumba, Kumbe and Koumbi, replacing the letter "k" for "c" (when turned into Spanish) means "drums" or "dances". He adds that cumbé, cumbia and cumba were drums of African origin in the Antilles. On the other hand, he states that cumba - kumba, African word for Bantu or Congo tribes, means "roar", "shock", "shouting", "scandal", "joy". The Panamanian folklorist Manuel Zarate adds to this theory in his "Tambor y Socavón" (Drum and Tunnel), as the root of the word cumbia. Also, for Ortiz, among congos, nkumbi is a drum.

Regarding the word cumbé the 22nd version of the Diccionário of the Real Academia de la Lengua, published in 2001, it is recorded as "Danza de la Guinea Ecuatorial" ('Dance of Equatorial Guinea') and "Son de esta danza" ('Music of this dance').

In 2006, Colombian musician and musicologist Guillermo Carbo Ronderos said that the etymology of the word cumbia is "still controversial" and that it "seems to derive from the Bantu word cumbé

== Origins ==
=== Chronicles and theories ===
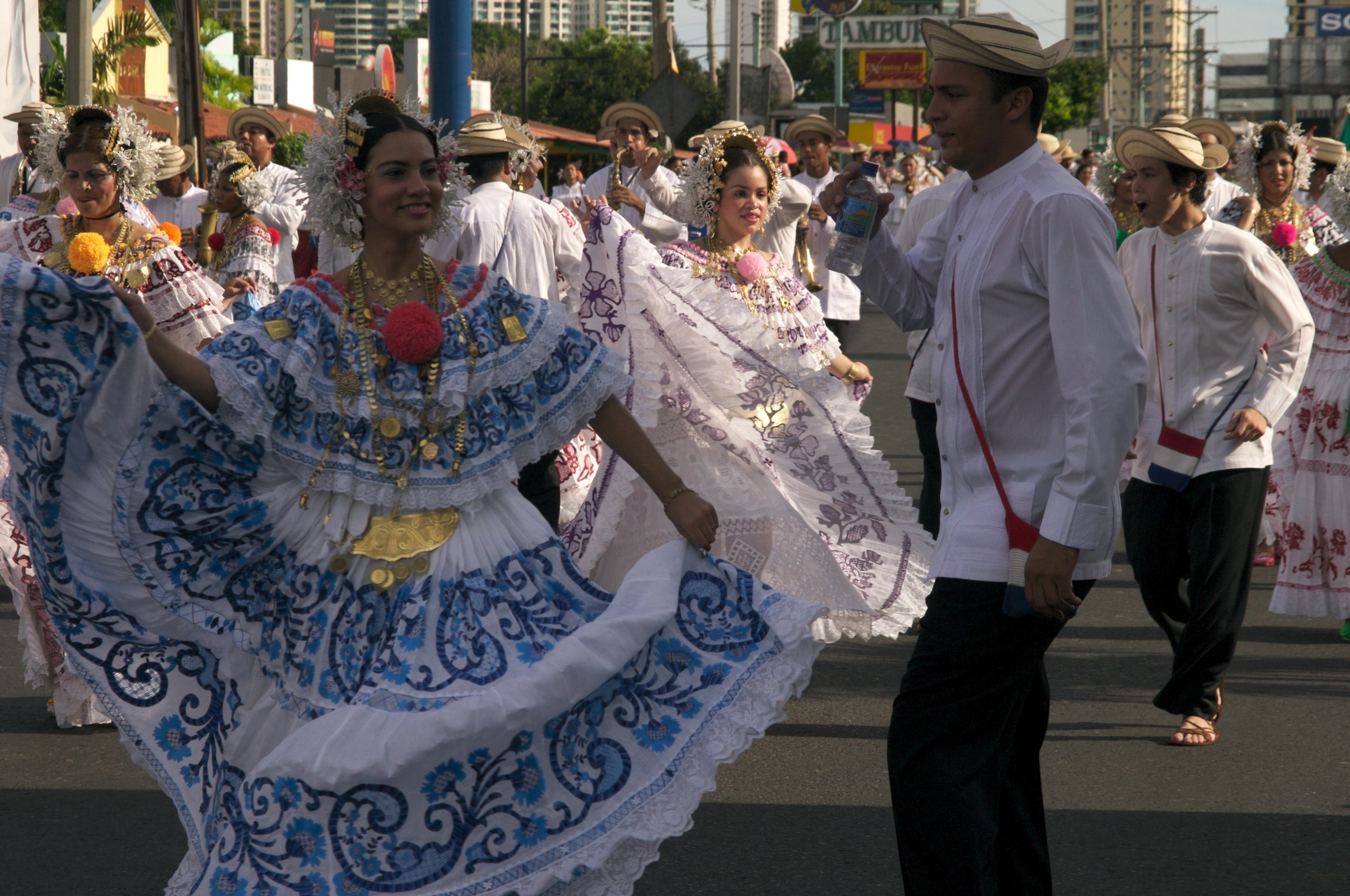
Couple dancing cumbia in a parade in Panama City.

In Panama it is generally accepted that the cumbia is of African descent. The dance is mentioned in many historical references, travel diaries, and newspapers of Panama during the 19th century.

The oldest news that exists in Panama of the cumbia dates from the early 19th century, from the family of Don Ramón Vallarino Obarrio, where slaves dance cumbia in his living room.

This story was passed from generation to generation since Doña Rita Vallarino Obarrio to Doña Matilde Obarrio, who published it in his "Sketch of Panama Colonial Life" in the early 20th century the XX.

the passage reads:

In the evenings, Creole families would gather to recite poetry and perform music typical of Spain and other parts of Europe. Other nights, they would bring their slaves to play their traditional drums and dances. Among the favorite African dances was El Punto. It consisted of intrinsic and abdominal movements and an African woman dancing alone. Another dance was the Cumbia. For this one, the couples advanced to the center of the room, both men and women, and gradually formed a circle of couples. The dance step of the man was a kind of leap backwards as the woman slid forward carrying a lighted candle in her hand holding a colored handkerchief.

A large dance, similar to the modern cumbia, was described by travelers visiting Panama during the nineteenth century. Theodore Johnson described such a dance accompanied by singing, drums and a guitar when he stayed overnight at Gorgona in 1849.

the passage reads:

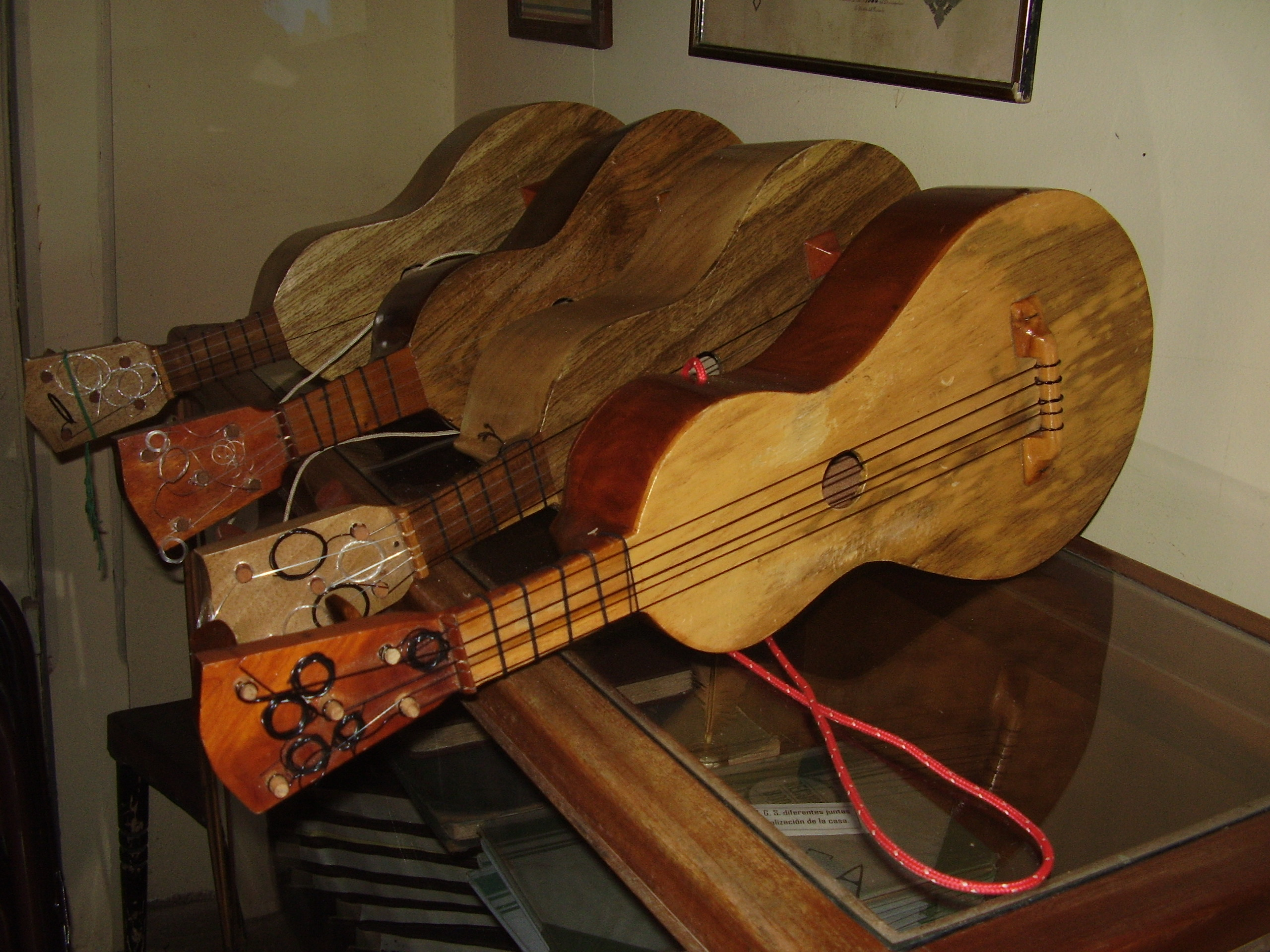
Mejorana, the small Spanish guitar described by Theodore Johnson in 1851

The last night we tarried at gorgona, a grand fandango came off, and hearing the merry beating of the drums we joined the crowd. In front of one of the houses were seated two of the men, strumming a monotonous cadence on drums made of the cocoa-tree, half of the size of a common pail, held between their knees, and another with the small Spanish Guitar, which furnishes the universal music on these occasions. The revellers form a ring, in the midst of which as many as choose enter into the dance. This consists generally of a lazy, slow shuffle, until excited by aguardiente, and emboldened as night progresses, the women dance furiously up to their favorites among the men, who are then obliged to follow suit, all joining in a kind of nasal squeal o chant. There is nothing graceful in their mode of dancing, but on the contrary heir motions are often indecent and disgusting.

Near to close of the century Ernesto Restrepo specifically mentioned the cumbia as a dance in the Darien.

the passage reads:

"The dances are generally public and accompanied only by the monotonous noise of one or more rustic drums. The cumbia, the tamborito and the pasito are the most common dances."

== Tradition ==
Simple in design but full of energy and life, the cumbia is the folk dance which best captures the spontaneous, fun-loving mood of fiesta time in Panama. The simple, repetitive melodies and accented drumbeats create a general feeling of happiness and gaiety which is reflected in the spirit of the dancers. the tempo is rapid as couples move quickly around the large circle, making individual turns and exchanges as directed by subtle changes in the music.

=== Music and instrumentation ===
Music of the cumbia is easily recognized by its binary rhythm and short phrases which never descend and finalize, but seem to repeat continuously. As a musical form the cumbia is well-known today because the melodies and rhythm have been adapted to the modern and very popular pindín. In earlier times as violin, guitar, tambor, caja, triangle and maraca or churuca accompanied the cumbia. Today the accordion replaces the stringed instruments in most musical groups.

=== Dance ===
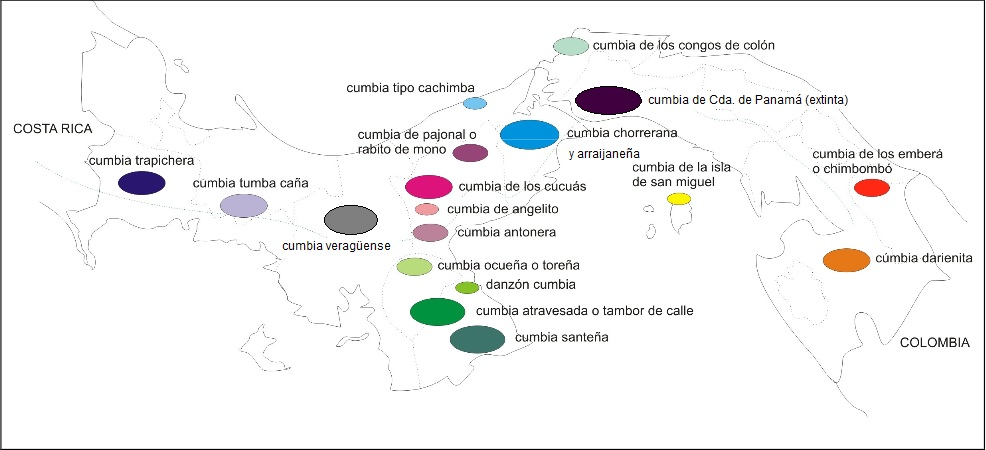
Geographic location of the different types of cumbia in the Panama isthmus, based on the Edwin Pitre mapping.

The way of dancing the cumbia varies between the different provinces of Panama.

==== Cumbia santeña ====
Dancers form a double circle with the men occupying the inner circle and the women the outer circle. Couple circle counter-clockwise and change their steps according to subtle variations in the melody. During figure one, "el paseo", couples stand side by side and circle with a rapid two-step. In figure two, la seguidilla, dancers face their partners and continue circling with small side-ward steps. When the music indicates figure three, el cambio, partners turn individually and walk around each other as in square dance do-si-do. Once more the partners turn individually and then continue circling with the seguidilla step of figure two. The entire sequence repeats several times.

===== Cumbia atravesá =====
This type of cumbia receives its name from the unusually restless quality of the accompaniment. The tempo is notably faster. While the accompanying instruments play a lively six-eight rhythm, the flexible nature of this meter enables the accent to vary between a two-four and a three-four rhythm. The choreography follows the common cumbia except of the addition of stamped feet, los zapateos, before the last seguidilla. In this figure partners perform the zapateos while circling counterclockwise, then face each other and separate with a series of rapid steps backward, el escobillado, before continuing with the seguidilla.

==== Cumbia chorrerana ====
Throughout the entire dance couples moves in a double circle with the simple sideward step already described as la seguidilla. the men freely express themselves with expansive gestures and vigorous dips and squats. More calmly, but with obvious enjoyment, the women circle the dance floor carrying lighted candles in their right hands. When the tambor cumbiero (drum) peals, partners continue circling counterclockwise while exchanging positions at the same time. The men move to the outer circle as the women return to the outer circle and the men move to the center. Partners repeat this graceful interchange one more time before returning to the seguidilla figure. Without pause one figure dissolves into the next, and the flames of the lighted candles create a luminous weaving pattern on the darkened stage.

== See also ==
- Baila music
- Latin Grammy Award for Best Cumbia/Vallenato Album
- Tamborito
- Tropical music
