= Punto music =

Ethnic folk music and dance tradition

The Panamanian punto (Spanish: punto panameño or el punto) is a Hispanic musical genre which includes melodic and choreographic form. It has composition created specifically for dance, typically performed by a single couple as a demonstration of skill, precision and grace. Unlike the tamborito and the Panamanian cumbia, it is performed as an intermission between other dances or music at a party or event.

== Choreography ==
Traditionally, one male and one female participant perform the dance.

The dance begins with the male kneeling with his left knee on the floor. Once the music begins to play, he takes the hands of the female dancer, who circles around him to the beat of the music.

The male and female back away from each other, often emoting longing and passion. The male then initiates the dance with the following steps, repeating in order two or three times:

1. El Paseo (transl. the walk) – The male and the female walk around in a wide circle.
2. El Zapateo – Face to face, the dancers show off their skill and dexterity during a change of music.
3. El Escobillao – The couple separate widely, often with a short backward-running movement.
4. El Seguidilla – The couple move closer and rotate with finesse in the center of the circle until a musical change indicates a return to the paseo.

== Music ==
The musical accompaniment includes:

- rabel – a rustic folk-fiddle with two or three strings of twisted horse-hair, this is the chief instrument which interprets the melody. An accordion may be substituted.
- mejoranera – a folk chordophone shaped like a short-necked guitar, accompanies the chief instrument.
- flamenco guitar (Spanish guitar) – a common folk instrument which may substitute or accompany the mejoranera.
- drums – traditionally of deer hide tensioned with ropes and wedges. The ripper or reamer drum (tambor repicador) has a high pitch and accompanies the melody. The bass drum (tambor pujador) and Hispanic snare drum set the rhythm.

Drums were not original to the genre and trumpets, common in traditional Spanish music, may also be added.

The punto's characteristic 6/8 time corresponds, in terms of classical rhythms, to an iambic dipodia. The melodic cantilena of the punto alternates two and three, with the trio predominating; the accompanying formula is invariable of ternary subdivision.

== Regional variants ==
This is a partial list of the regional variants of the punto:

- Punto Santeño – This is the most-popular form in Panama. It features walking, dancing, brushing, jumping, and then the seguidilla where the man performs with hands raised.
- Punto Ocueño – This has a free-style zapateo, omits the escobillao phase, and the seguidilla is performed with hands joined.
- Puntos of Chorrera: These are danced with very specific music and choreography, distinct from the santeño form.
  - Punto de Diablos – performed by members of the Grandiablos dance at the end of their demonstration, and includes several pairs of dancers who interact to humorous effect.
  - Punto de Salon – performed by one couple at a time.
- Punto de Parita – This displays striking movements similar to the Punto de Salon.
- Punto de Mejorana – Similar to the zapateo with variation in the formation of the round. A striking difference from other dances of this type is that only men can move outside the circle. The woman may make an unusual flourish with her skirts.
  - Punto costeño – a variation with embellishments to a series of arpeggios.
