= Samy and Sandra Sandoval =

Samy Sandoval and Sandra Sandoval
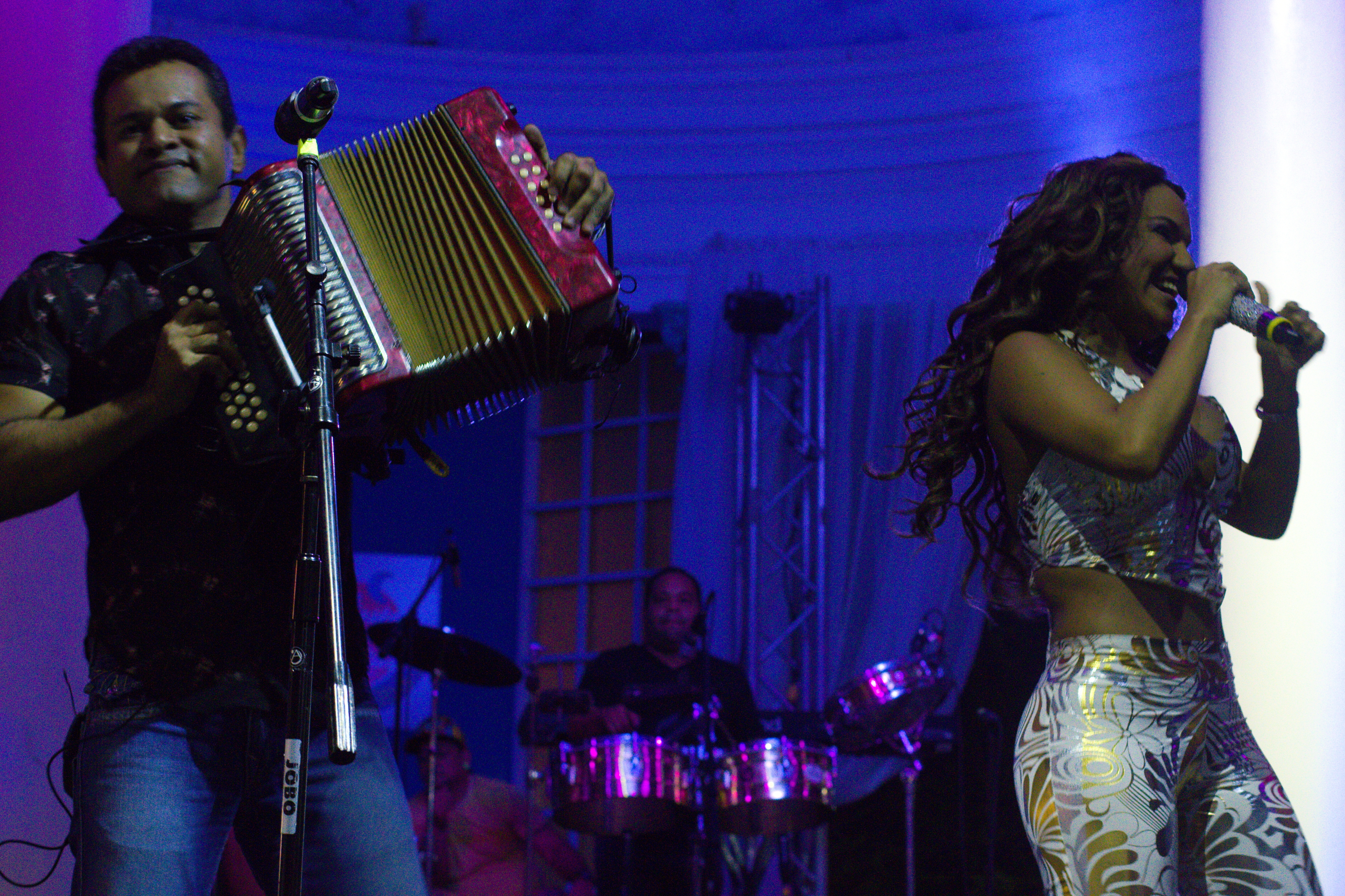
- Samy and Sandra Sandoval in 2012

Background information
- Origin: Herrera Province, Panama
- Genres: Cumbia
- Years active: 1995–present

Samy and Sandra Sandoval are a brother-and-sister musical duo from Panama. They perform típico, a form of traditional Panamanian music and Panamanian-style cumbia. They have been praised as patrónes de la cumbia (masters of cumbia), and are very popular in Panama.

== Early lives and career ==
Samy was born on 15 February 1968, and Sandra was born on 10 April 1970, to Luis and Dolores Sandoval in Chitré, in the Herrera Province of Panama. At age eight, Samy began to play the accordion, and after listening to songs at home, Sandra began singing. When Samy was 11 and Sandra 9, the two began performing on stage in their native Herrera Province. They slowly gained popularity through performances in other provinces, such as Coclé, Chiriquí, Veraguas, and Los Santos. By age 11, Samy had entered and won a number of music and talent contests, though the limited number of fans of típico music, in turn, limited the duo's popularity. They then made several appearances on Panamanian television networks, such as RTVE and Channel 11, to reach a larger audience. At ages 15 and 13, Samy and Sandra began to travel with their band, Ritmo Montañero (Mountaineer Rhythm). They became popular with young, middle-class audiences, and their popularity began to surpass that of many other típico stars. Samy and Sandra Sandoval are often credited as having been the first to expose the general public to típico, pindín, and other Panamanian folk-music styles. Their rise in popularity was attributed to Sandra's voice, dance ability, and enthusiasm, as well as Samy's skill at playing the accordion.

== Musical hits ==
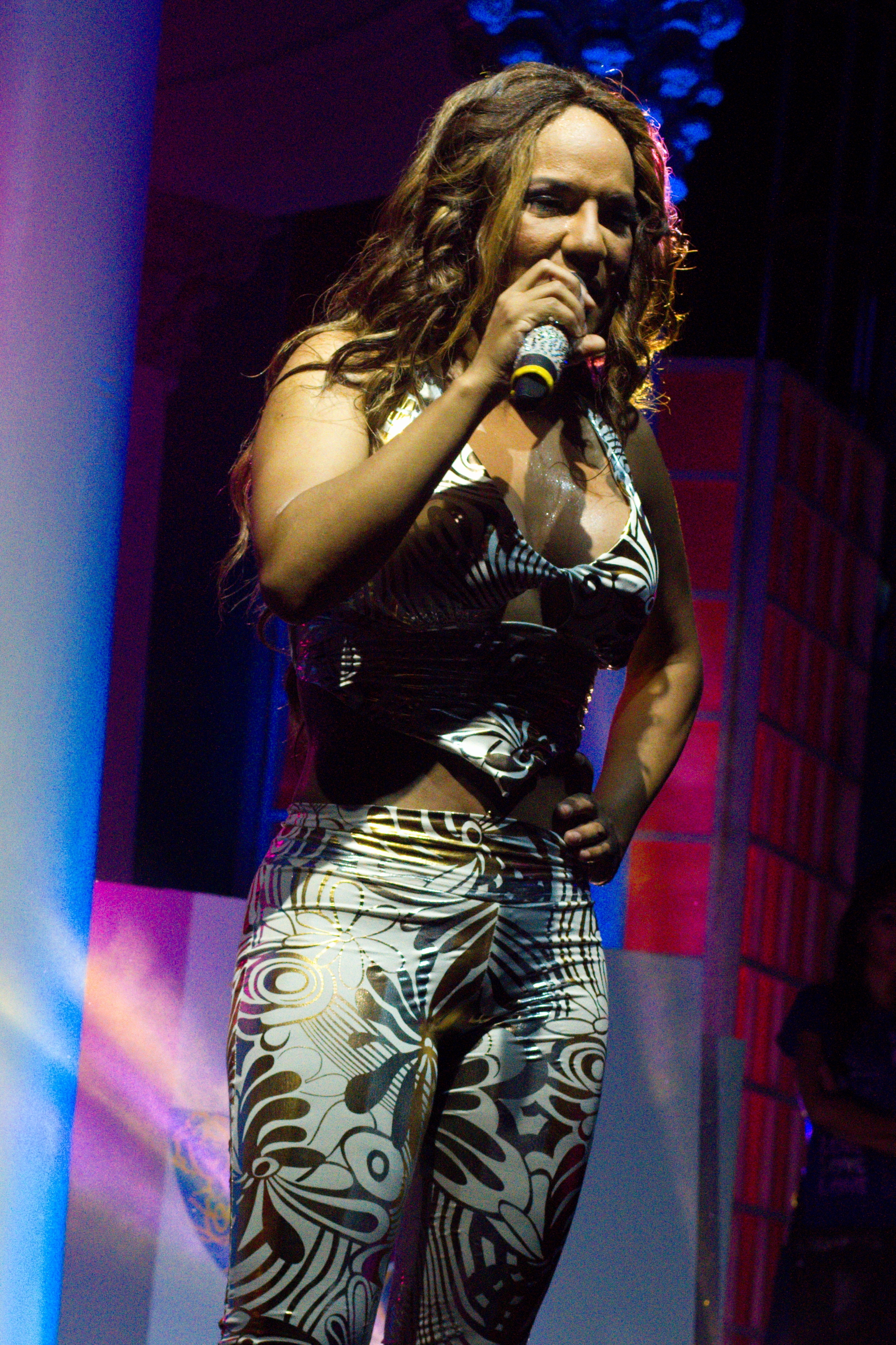
Sandra Sandoval performing in 2012

The Sandovals' successful songs include "Brindemos por lo nuestro" ("Toast to Ourselves"), "La mujer superficial" ("Superficial Woman"), "Oiga el viejo pá jodé," and "Lo que no da se deja" ("What is ungiving ought to be abandoned"). In 1994, at the Encuentro de Accordeones (Meeting of Accordions) festival, they became popular with the song "La gallina fina" ("The Fine Hen"), which they also performed on the soundtrack for the 2001 movie The Tailor of Panama. They have released 15 albums and sold more than 30,000 records, and have had a platinum album. They have recorded a duet with Gilberto Santa Rosa, who considered them some of the best performers of tipíco.

== Other works ==
The Sandovals' life stories have been the topic of television shows such as Los compadres, Aires de mi tierra, Hecho en Panamá, and De Mujeres. They also had a small, regular role in the television comedy series Los Vergaras. Recently, they have appeared on Univision's Sábado Gigante, and in El Festival de la Calle 8. A quote by Sandra, "No hay mujer fea, sino mujer sin plata" ("There are no ugly women, only women without money"), is now a popular phrase among many Panamanians. Samy and Sandra frequently appear at Las Fiestas del Rey Momo. They have performed throughout the United States and the Dominican Republic, and have given concerts in Belgium and the Netherlands, performing to audiences of more than 70,000. They have also performed for the Monegasque royalty. They were the subject of biography, Samy and Sandra: The Story, written by Sergio Pérez Saavedra, and a DVD by the same title. It was well received by fans.

== Personal lives ==
Both Samy and Sandra have completed formal education. Samy has a degree in civil engineering; he met his wife Iraida at university. After dating for five years, they married on Valentine's Day 1994. They have two sons. Sandra completed a degree in law and practiced as an attorney intermittently. She later decided to devote her time entirely to entertaining and her family.
