= Yamilka Pitre =

Panamanian singer

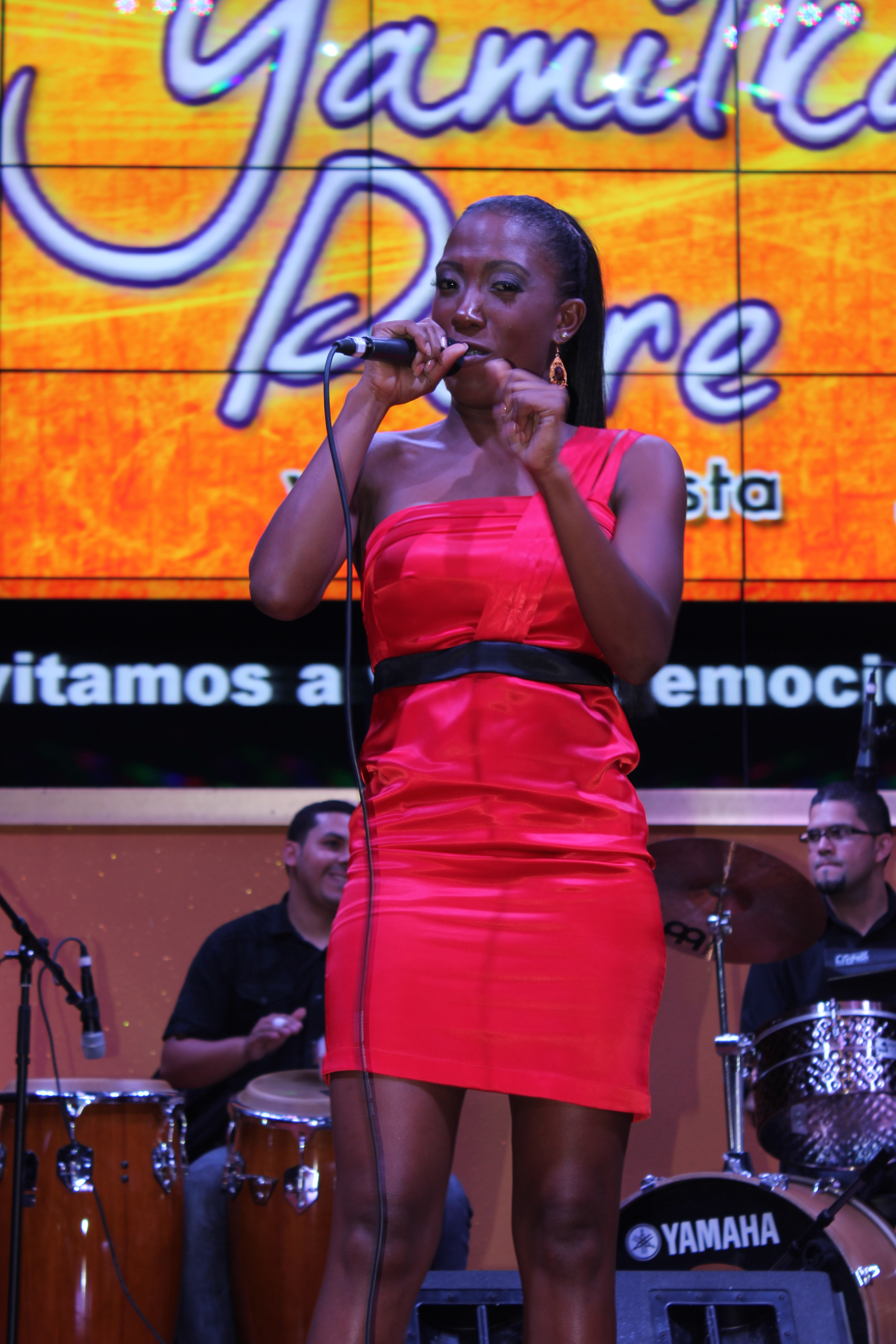

Background information
- Birth name: Yamilka Pitre
- Born: 29 August 1984 (age 40); Panama
- Genres: Salsa music
- Occupation: singer

Yamilka Nohemí Pitre Tejada (born 29 August 1984) is a Panamanian singer, winner of the contest Vive la música 2009. She is on the record label Gaitan Bros.

== Biography ==
Pitre was born on 29 August 1984, in Panama. She studied at the Instituto Dr. Alfredo Cantón. She participated in the play Detrás del muro while she was in jail and wrote the song "Un día más," one of the musical themes of the play.

She studied for BA in English in translation and music at the Conservatory of Musicians of Panama. She participated in the competition on TVN (National Television), Vive la música, where she won first place.

She was also named "Mujer destaca del año", by Radio Mil Broadcaster. She recorded her first single titled "Regresa a mí," and then the song "Que va a ser de mi". Her daughter Nora Eva was born in 2013. She was on the show Dancing with the stars, but she had to withdraw because of her pregnancy. Her partners in the show were Andrés Poveda, Joysi Love, Ismael Ortiz, Jovana Michelle Quintero, Massiel, María Jesús Ruiz, Fufo Rosario, Rubén Moreno, Érika Nota, and Saiko.

== Songs ==
- "Regresa a mí"
- "Que va a ser de mi"

== Filmography ==
=== Reality shows ===
- Vive la música 2009
- Dancing with the stars 2014

=== Programs ===
- Buenos Días 2014

=== Theater ===
- Detrás del muro
