= Guararé =

- Town and corregimiento
- Motto: Land of the Chucu Chucu
- Location within Panama
- Coordinates: 7°49′12″N 80°16′12″W
- Country: Panama
- Province: Los Santos
- District: Guararé
- Established: 21 January 1880

Government
  - Mayor: Amado Franco Bustamante

Area
  - Land: 16.4 km^{2} (6.3 sq mi)

Population (2010)
  - Total: 4,524
  - Density: 275.4/km^{2} (713/sq mi)
- Population density calculated based on land area.
- Time zone: UTC−5 (EST)
- Climate: Aw

Guararé is a town and corregimiento in Guararé District, Los Santos Province, Panama, with a population of 4,524 as of 2010. It is the seat of Guararé District. Its population as of 1990 was 3,329, and its population as of 2000 was 3,883. The birthplace of world champion boxer Roberto Durán, the town is also recognized by its annual festival of La Mejorana.
