= Tamborito =

Genre of Panamanian folk music and dance

El Tamborito, literally translated to "the little drum", is a genre of Panamanian folkloric music and dance dating back as early as the 17th century. The tamborito is a traditional folk music and dance of Panama. The dance is a romantic, couple's dance, often involving a small percussion ensemble, and in all versions, a female chorus. The tamborito is performed in formal costumes in front of large, interactive crowds that form a large circle around the performers. The members of such crowds often participate in the percussion of the song, as well as the actual dance. The Tamborito is most commonly performed during Panamanian festivals, and in particular, the Panama Carnival.

== History ==
The tamborito is a derivative of mestizo dance and folkloric music, with the melody tracing its roots as far back as the 17th century. This genre of folkloric music is a hybrid mix of the Spanish, Amerindian, and African cultures. Its rhythm is of African influence, the lyrics tend to be repetitive, and as in West African vocal music, it also incorporates popular commentary. Panama's most famous tamborito was written in 1918 by Juan Pastor Peredes, put to music by Carmen Lagnon, entitled "El tambor de la alegria".

== Musical composition ==
The tamborito is musically performed to the beat of drums, the stomping of feet, the clapping of hands, and the chanting of harmonic poems, called coplas. Vocally, the tamborito is led by a female singer, the cantalante, who sings of the lust, frustration, and sexual tension, and attraction felt between the men and women at Carnival. The onlooking spectators and awaiting group of performers, known as the estribillio, respond to the cantalante's song by clapping twice to a measure and by the singing of the copla. Coplas are Spanish poems, which are sung lyrically, and comprise four-line stanzas.

The percussion involved in the tamborito consists of three drums in the center of the circle created by the estribillio. Three drums, native to Panama, are used in the performance of the tamborito - the caja, the repujador, and the repicador, and are made from the hollowing of local Panamanian trees, with the heads constructed from tanned cowhide.

The drums represent the three primary aspects of the tamborito. The caja, the smallest of the drums, is a short, wide drum used to create staccato tones, much like those created by the estribillio. The repujador is the masculine aspect of the tamborito, as this drum creates the base. It is a long, slender drum. The repicador is the feminine aspect of the tamborito. It is similar in shape to the repujador, but creates high-pitched notes that are scaled to fit the rhythm.

== Tamborito dance ==
The dance of the tamborito is one between a man and a woman couple, of a sexual nature, often referred to as a courtship dance, and begins with the clapping of the crowd and the playing of the percussion band.

As the female and male dancers take their places within the circle, the repicador drummer gives a signal to the dancers in the form of three knocks. In response, the female dancer gives the percussion band three curtseys, known as quiebres, the last of which results in a twirling of her body. The male dancer kneels three times, known as the golpes magistrales, thus beginning the dance, which is a series of shuffling steps, with the woman maneuvering her skirt in a provocative fashion and the man positioning his arms in a protective fashion. At the conclusion of the dance, the repicador drummer again gives three knocks, the male and female dancers curtsey once more, and the crowd gives their approval of the dance in the form of a vivas chant.

== Tamborito attire ==
The attire worn by the performers during the tamborito is quite elegant and flashy. The women wear an embroidered gown known as la pollera, and the men wear a costume called el montuno.

The pollera is only worn on festival occasions and consists of two ruffles, embroidered with colors and intricate designs; two pom-pons are fastened to the front and rear of the woman's chest, with lace gracefully draped from handmade thread lace insertion at the neckline. The stitching and thread used to detail the pollera must be the same color as the velvet, heelless shoes. The women's outfit is completed with gold hairpins and a flashy headpiece, which is supposed to resemble a crown. The headpiece is commonly made of shell.

The montuno worn by the male performers is much less intricate than the pollera. It generally consists of a long-sleeved, white-collared shirt, which fits loosely on the performer. The trousers worn by the male are made of black, navy blue, or white cotton and come to knee length. The outfit is completed with a shallow straw hat and canvas or leather shoes.

== In popular culture ==
Besides being the national song and dance of Panama, the tamborito is important to Panamanian culture because folkloric music plays a continuous role in Panama's contemporary music. The tamborito genre of music competes for radio and record sales with the other popular music of Panama, and has created such Panamanian celebrities as Samy and Sandra Sandoval.
