= Mejoranera =

Musical instrument

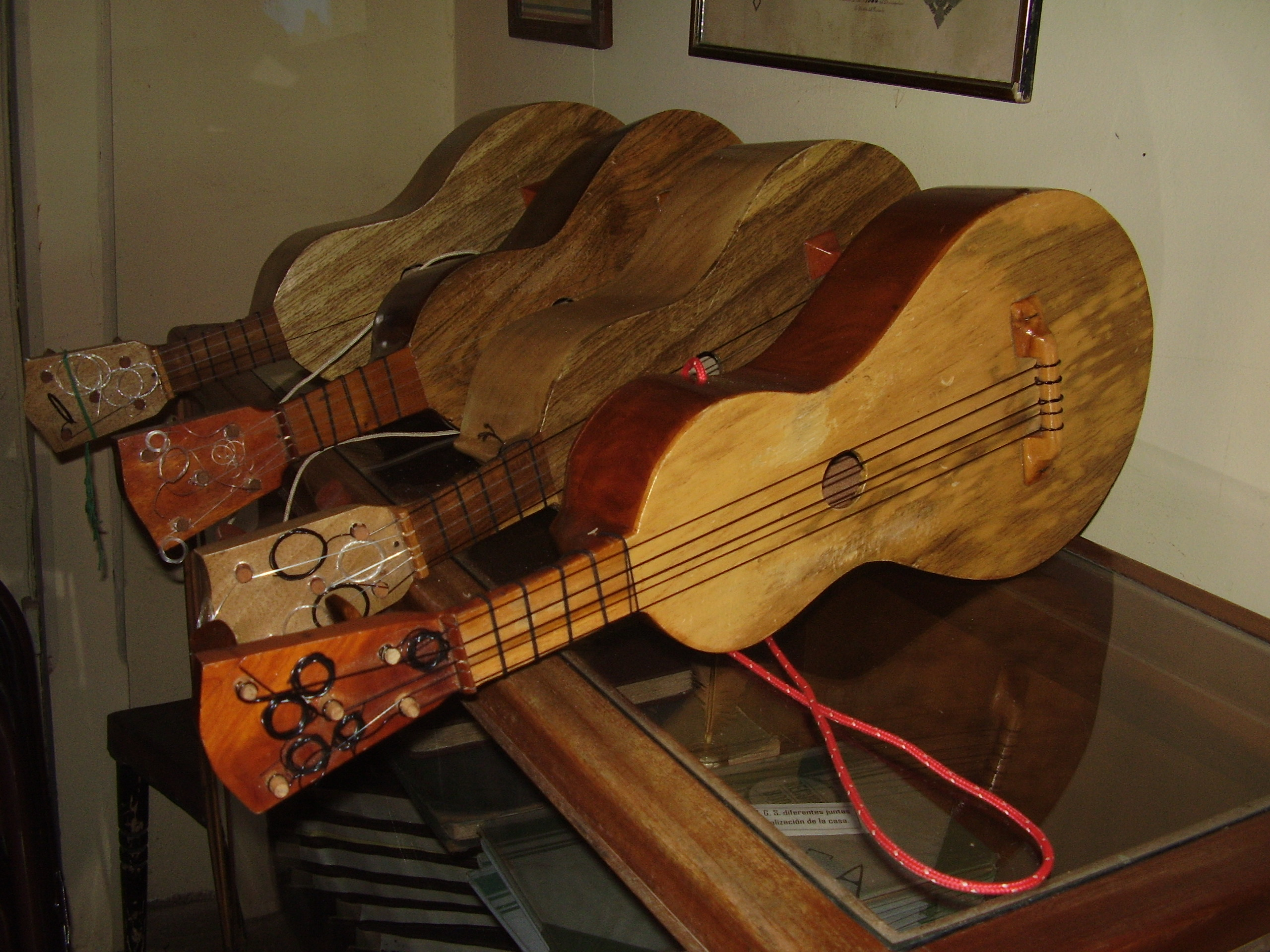
- Mejoraneras

String instrument
- Classification: chordophone
- Hornbostel–Sachs classification: 321.322 (necked lute)

Related instruments
- bandola, bandolin, viola de cocho

The mejoranera or mejorana is a folkloric chordophone from Panama. It is carved from one block of wood (usually cedar) or from dry fibers of Bejuco, and is shaped like a small guitar.

It has five nylon, horse hair, or gut strings. The mejoranera is tuned in either an e'-b-a-a'-d' (by 2) or an e'-b-g-g'-d' (by 6) sequence

A mejoranera player is called a mejoranero (male) or mejoranera (female). Typically this instrument is played by men.

A common mejoranera tuning.

== History ==
The first Spanish conquistadors arrived on the isthmus of Panama in the early part of the sixteenth century, in which sailors brought a style of tap dance known to them as "zapateo", now known as "mejorana" dance, which includes this instrument.

The mejoranera is similar to a guitar but slightly smaller and with a shorter neck; this is due to the relation of the baroque guitar that was brought over from Europe.

It first appeared at the town of La Mesa in Veraguas, but is now popular in all central provinces, Veraguas, Herrera and Los Santos, and the most representative musical instrument of this country.

== Construction ==
The mejoranera is traditionally carved out of a single block of wood. Although nowadays there are some mejoraneras with bent sides like a guitar, most are still made in this traditional way. The measurements are: 13.5 - 12 - 22 cm. From the top, 40 cm of the Fund, 8 cm height, 22 cm Mango, 10 cm Pala, and 62 cm total length.

The mejoranera is a bit smaller than a guitar, the fretboard and neck or shorter. It uses five strings, which initially were: dry reed fibers, horsehair, later today guts and nylon. The wood used to build the mejoranera is cedar. It is used to accompany singers' and troubadours' vernacular.

== Cultural importance and usage ==
The mejoranera is used in many of the folkloric music in Panama, but most importantly within songs that are themselves called "mejoranas". These mejoranas are romantic ballads that are sung exclusively by men in the community in either the privacy of their own home or at public celebrations. For this same reason, there is a heavy importance in the mejoranera, for they are the primary instrument of choice for these men who sing mejoranas. There is an important annual folk festival in Panama called the Festival of Mejorana that takes place in Guararé, the center of folkloric Panamanian culture.
