= Cumbia =

Musical rhythms and folk dance traditions of Latin America

Cumbia (Note: UK: /ˈkʊmbɪər/ KUUM-beer, US: /ˈkuːmbiːə/ KOOM-bee-ə; Spanish pronunciation: [ˈkumbja]) refers to a number of musical rhythms and folk dance traditions of Latin America, generally involving musical and cultural elements from American Indigenous peoples, Europeans, and Africans during colonial times. Cumbia is said to have come from funeral traditions in the Afro-Colombian community.

Cumbia traditionally uses three drums (tambora, tambor alegre and llamador), three flutes (gaita hembra and gaito macho, both forms of Colombian flute, and flauta de millo) and has a 2/2 or 2/4 meter. The sound of cumbia can be characterized as having a simple "chu-chucu-chu" rhythm created by the guacharaca. The genre frequently incorporates brass instruments and piano. In order to properly understand the interlocking relationship between cumbia's roots, its Pan-American (and then global) roots, and its subgenres, Colombia's geocultural complexities must be taken into account.

Examples of cumbia include:

- Colombian cumbia is a musical rhythm and traditional folk dance from Colombia. It has elements of three different cultures, American Indigenous, African, and Spanish, being the result of the long and intense meeting of these cultures during the Conquest and the Colony. The Colombian cumbia is the origin of all the other variations, including the tradition of dancing it with candles in the dancers' hands.
- Panamanian cumbia, Panamanian folk dance and musical genre, developed by enslaved people of African descent during colonial times and later syncretized with American Indigenous and European cultural elements.

== 20th century ==
Most Hispanic American countries have made their own regional version of Cumbia, some of them with their own particularity.

Over the 20th century, Cumbia expanded beyond Colombia through migration, media circulation, and cross border musical exchange. In Mexico, Cumbia developed into multiple sub genres, becoming a cornerstone of urban popular culture. In Texas, Cumbia Tejana emerged as a unique fusion shaped by Chicano musicians who blended Colombian elements with Tejano, Conjunto, and pop influences. Scholars argue that Cumbia’s adaptability is a reason for its global success. As it enters new regions, musicians incorporate local instruments, rhythms, and performance practices while retaining the genre's recognizable percussion structure. Today, Cumbia remains a hemispheric genre, connecting generations and communities across borders.

== History of Colombian cumbia ==
Cumbia's background came from the coastal region of Colombia. To be more specific, its dance came from a coastal traditional culture, as cumbia had multiple ethnic influences that originated from this region. One of the biggest factors of its heritage is the African influences that was brought over by the African slaves imported from the colonization of the Spaniards. The influence came from the costeño dance. Another influence was the integration of Spanish people. The Spanish folksongs with influences from the indigenous caused the fusion of races and the elements of their cultures were likewise fused.

The history of cumbia has evolved throughout the years, known as a street dance but had a period of transiting into a ballroom dance. Cumbia is commonly known for having many subgenres from different countries which contributes to the different dance styles known. Cumbia can be referred to as a folk dance while also being known globally as a street dance. To better understand what the dances of cumbia resemble it's better to know the basics of the dance. Cumbia is danced in pairs, consisting the amorous conquest of a woman by a man. This is crucial since the dance from the Atlantic coast has the woman holding a candle in her right hand. This serves as two narrative functions; one to light the way for the dancing woman and the latter for a more serious motif. The latter can be portrayed in an imaginative sentence as a weapon by which the woman defends herself against the advances of her partner.

Since the 1950s, cumbia has been an art form that is stylized, orchestrated and lyricized, contrary to the traditional form. This has diverged through the years and the world-known genre even had a brief period in the 1970s where it lost its popularity.

== Expansion into Latin America ==
As the genre evolved, it expanded throughout Latin America. The expansion has led to the creation of new variations on the form, and international recognition of the genre changed public perceptions. Cumbia almost disappeared in Colombia in the 1970s after the introduction of salsa. Although that was detrimental it could be argued that cumbia found stability in Central America, Mexico, and Peru. The transformation of cumbia in other countries to better align with the taste of populations with very different aesthetic traditions from the strongly African-derived coastal culture from which it originally emerged.

Representing cumbia being perceived as expressing the harmonious outcome of racial and cultural blending, this socially affected the public views on the region's highly discriminated mestizo working class. Socially and economically some changed their views on mestizos due to cumbia being a large factor in shaping their perspective - except in Argentina, where it's still largely seen as vulgar and offensive by much of the middle class and has thus mostly helped reinforce lower class stereotypes.

== Regional adaptations of Colombian cumbia ==
=== Argentina ===
- Argentine cumbia
- Cumbia villera, a subgenre of Argentine cumbia born in the slums
- Cumbia santafesina, a musical genre that emerged in Santa Fe, Argentina

=== Bolivia ===
- Bolivian cumbia

=== Chile ===
- Chilean cumbia
- New Chilean cumbia

=== Colombia ===
- Colombian cumbia
- Bullerengue
- Porro
- Cumbia vallenata, a fusion genre that mixes elements of cumbia and vallenato, both of Colombian origin
- Merecumbé, a fusion genre that mixes Colombian cumbia and Dominican merengue

=== Costa Rica ===
- Costa Rican cumbia

=== Ecuador ===
- Ecuadorian cumbia
- Turbocumbia

=== El Salvador ===
- Salvadoran cumbia
- Cumbia marimbera, a subgenre of Cumbia that is widely popular in Southern Mexico and Central America

=== Guatemala ===
- Guatemalan cumbia
- Cumbia marimbera, a subgenre of Cumbia that is widely popular in Southern Mexico and Central America

=== Honduras ===
- Honduran cumbia
- Cumbia marimbera, a subgenre of Cumbia that is widely popular in Southern Mexico and Central America

=== Mexico ===
- Mexican cumbia
- Southeast cumbia or chunchaca, a variant of Mexican cumbia
- Northern Mexican cumbia or cumbia norteña, a variant of Mexican cumbia, developed in northeastern states Mexico and some parts of Texas (former Mexican territory)
- Cumbia sonidera, a variant of Mexican cumbia, popular in Mexico City and central Mexico
- Cumbia marimbera, a subgenre of Cumbia that is widely popular in Southern Mexico and Central America
- Cumbia pegassera, a variant of Mexican cumbia that is primarily popular in Northern Mexico and the United States.
- Tecnocumbia, a subgenre of cumbia that combines elements of cumbia and electronic music.
- Cumbia rebajada, a subculture originating in Monterrey, but popular worldwide, that uses significantly slowed-down versions of accordion-based Colombian cumbia records.

=== Nicaragua ===
- Nicaraguan cumbia
- Cumbia chinandegana
- Cumbia marimbera, a subgenre of Cumbia that is widely popular in Southern Mexico and Central America

=== Panama ===
- Panamanian cumbia; A subgenre that involves Panamanian folk dance and the cumbia musical genre, developed by enslaved people of African descent during the expansion of Spanish rule in Panama and later syncretized with American Indigenous and European cultural elements.

=== Paraguay ===
- Cachaca, a fusion of cumbia sonidera, norteña, vallenato and cumbia villera

=== Peru ===
- Peruvian cumbia also known as chicha or psychedelic cumbia
- Chicha also known as Andean cumbia or Andean tropical music
- Amazonian cumbia or jungle cumbia, a popular subgenre of Peruvian cumbia, created in the Peruvian Amazon
- Cumbia piurana, a set of styles and sub-genres linked to cumbia that have been produced in Piura, a region on the north Peruvian coast, since the mid-1960s
- Cumbia sanjuanera, a subgenre of cumbia piurana
- Cumbia sureña, a subgenre of Peruvian cumbia, a fusion of Andean cumbia and techno

=== United States ===
- American cumbia
- Tex-Mex cumbia
- Tejano or Tex-Mex music, a popular music style that fuses elements of cumbia with other genres of Mexican and American origin that developed in Texas and Mexico in the 20th century.
- Cumbia rap, a variant of cumbia that is popular in the United States and Latin America that includes elements of hip-hop and rap

=== Uruguay ===
- Uruguayan cumbia

=== Venezuela ===
- Venezuelan cumbia
