= Music of El Salvador =

Collective term for the dances, rhythms and styles of music from El Salvador

Hip Hop/Rap	El Travieso	El Seko	Cumbia	'Xuc
Merengue	Rock
Indigenous
Jazz	Funk	Pop
Ska	Reggae
Latin Jazz	Electronic
Son	Latin Power
Folklorico	Trova	Salsa	Pop Latino	Electronica
Nueva canción	Punta

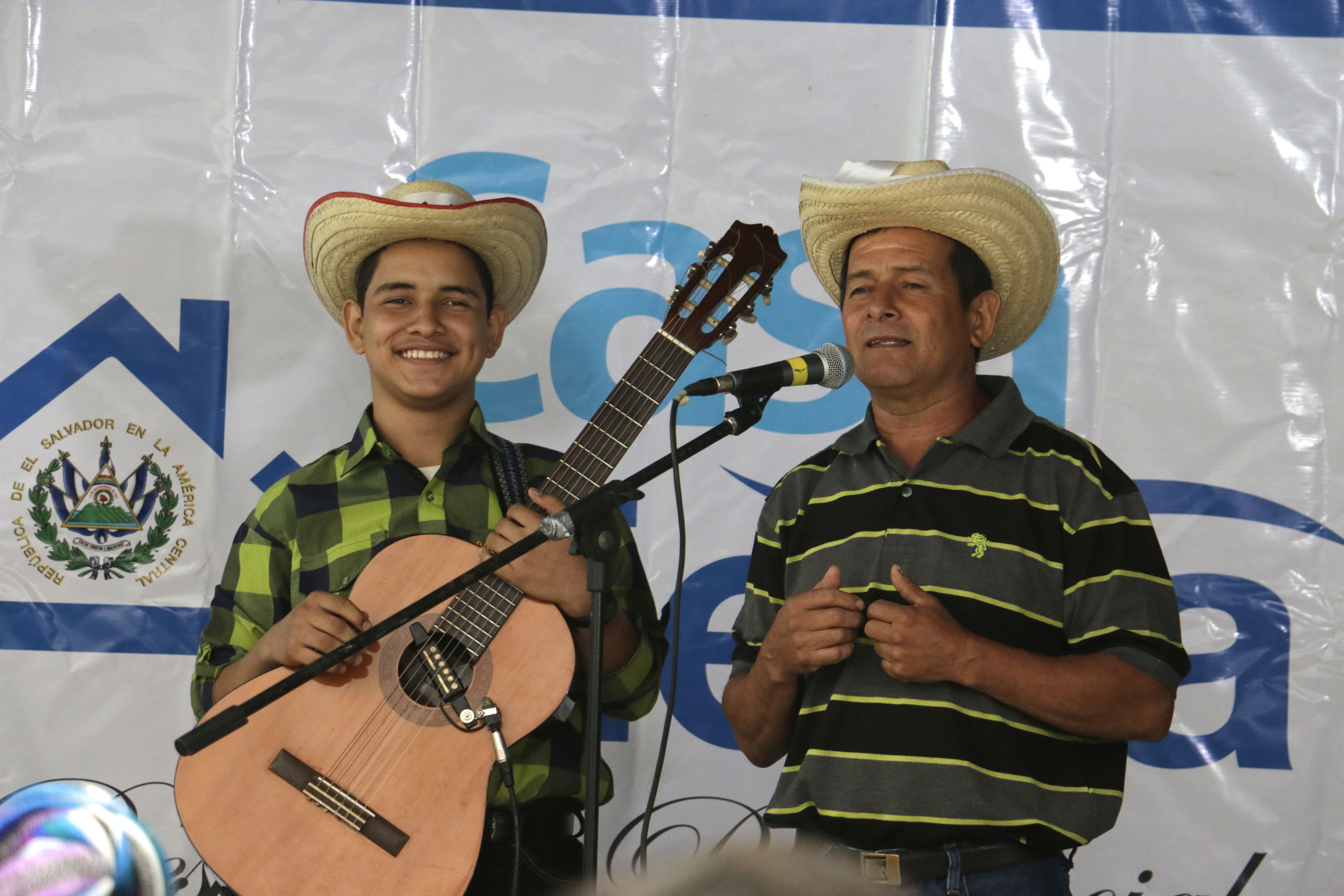
Salvadoran musicians

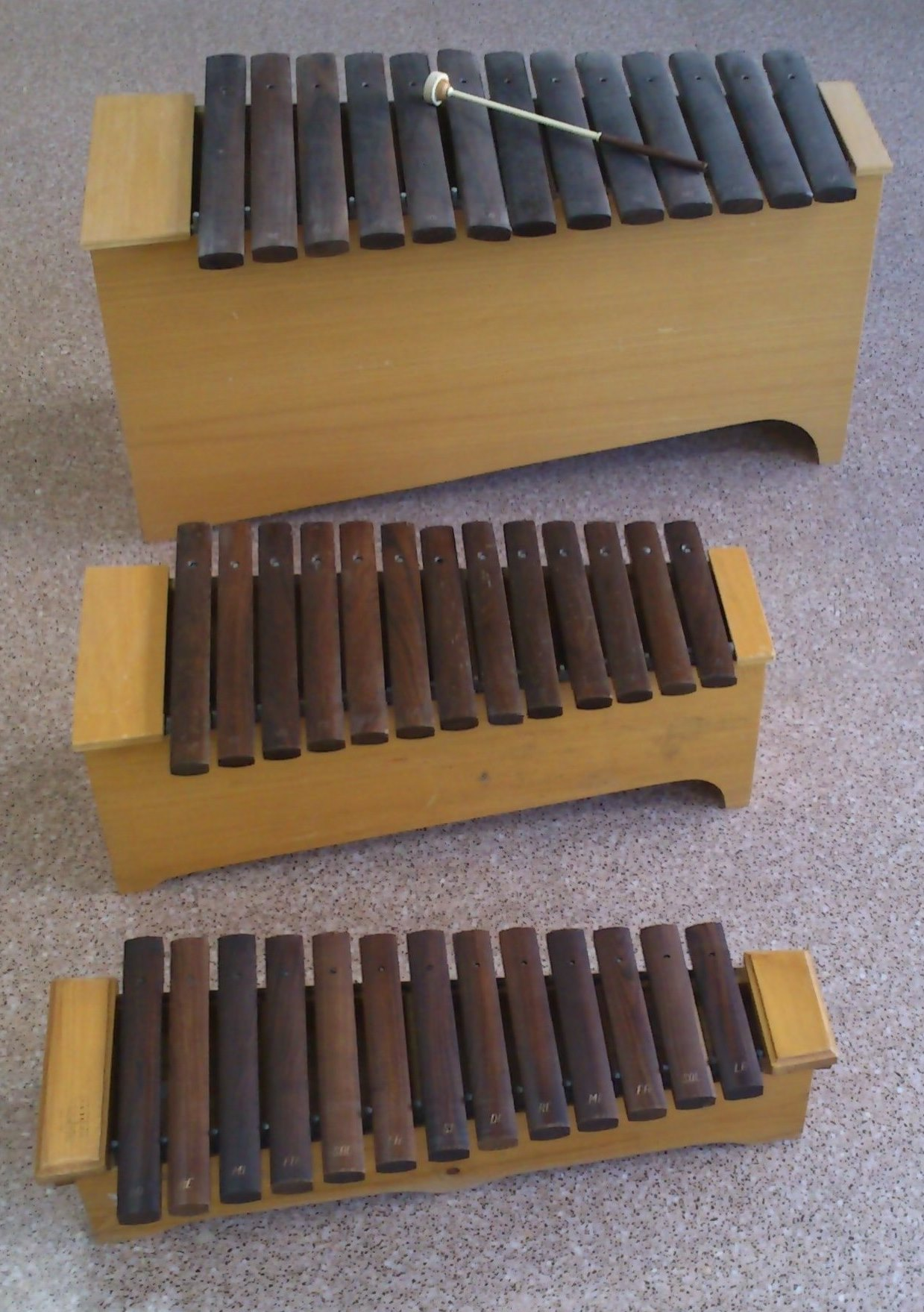
The Xylophone is El Salvador's national instrument

The music of El Salvador refers to the Music of the Republic of El Salvador and is encompassed in the wider Latin American musical traditions.

During the colonial period, El Salvador's music began to be influenced by various ethnic groups involved in the colonization process.

- Music instruments that are present in El Salvador are Native American Pan-Indianism instruments such as Native American flute and drums. El Salvador has an American indigenous population which includes the Lenca, Pipil and Mayan people.
- European colonizers brought instruments, like the guitar, pedal steel guitar, fanfare trumpet and piano.
- When African slaves were brought to El Salvador, they introduced instruments like the xylophone, güira, conga drums and mbira.
- A sizeable Arab migration that arrived into El Salvador in late 19th and early 20th century, from mainly Lebanese people and Palestinian Salvadorans brought Arab instruments like oud, ney, goblet drum and qanun (instrument).
- Roman Catholic religious contemporary Catholic liturgical music instrument such as tubular bells, pipe organ, and glass harmonica are also present.

Modern Salvadoran indigenous music is inspired by ambient music, soundscape, ambient synthesizer, and space music, while Salvadoran Roman Catholic music is influenced by monastery chorus Latin choir Gregorian chant music. This music includes religious songs (mostly Roman Catholic) used to celebrate Christmas and other holidays, especially feast days of the saints with tubular bell chimes. Satirical and rural lyrical themes are common and played with xylophone.

Popular styles in modern El Salvador include Salvadoran cumbia, rock and native Mesoamerican Indigenous music which historically have had a long and large significance and impact to modern El Salvador music styles.

== Folk music ==
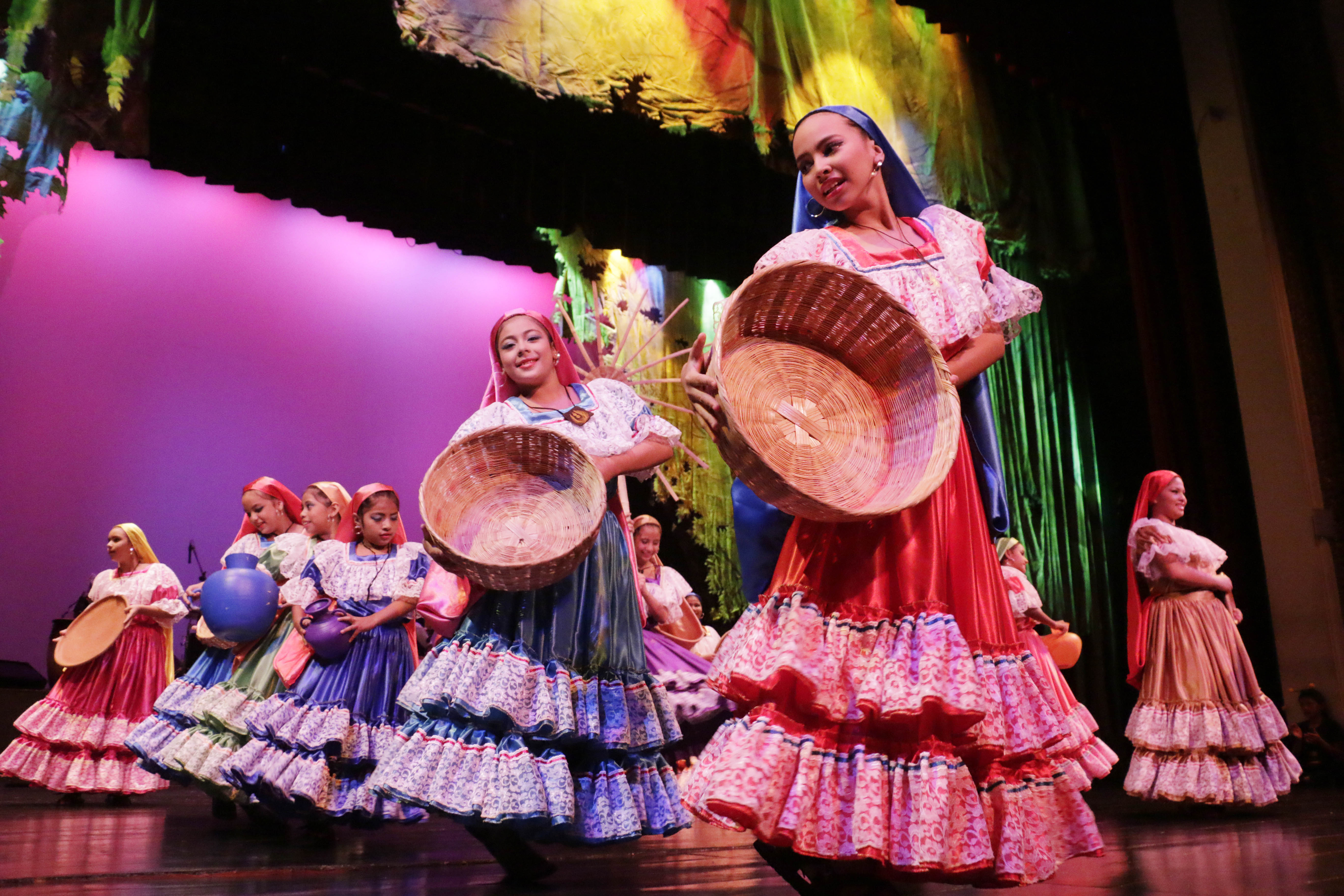
Salvadoran women in folkloric garb

Musical repertoire consists of xuc, danza, pasillo, marcha and canciones. The Xylophone is a representative folk music instrument. Some of the most well known songs are "El Carbonero" and "El Torito Pinto".

Marimba is one of the traditional folk music styles performed in El Salvador and was first introduced by African slaves. Two versions, of the percussion instrument that has intonations like a piano, the marimba de arco, which was played with a bow, and the marimba criolla were introduced. A coup d’état in 1932 resulted in the massacre of around 30,000 people and destruction of both the indigenous population and the original marimba de arco. The modern version of the instrument is a three octave marimba de arco and the music is always instrumental. The heyday of marimba in El Salvador was from the 1920s to 1930s when musicians played internationally, but because the instrument could be adapted to other styles, it remained popular until rock came on the scene in the late 1950s and early 1960s. In 1990, a revival of the indigenous music began.

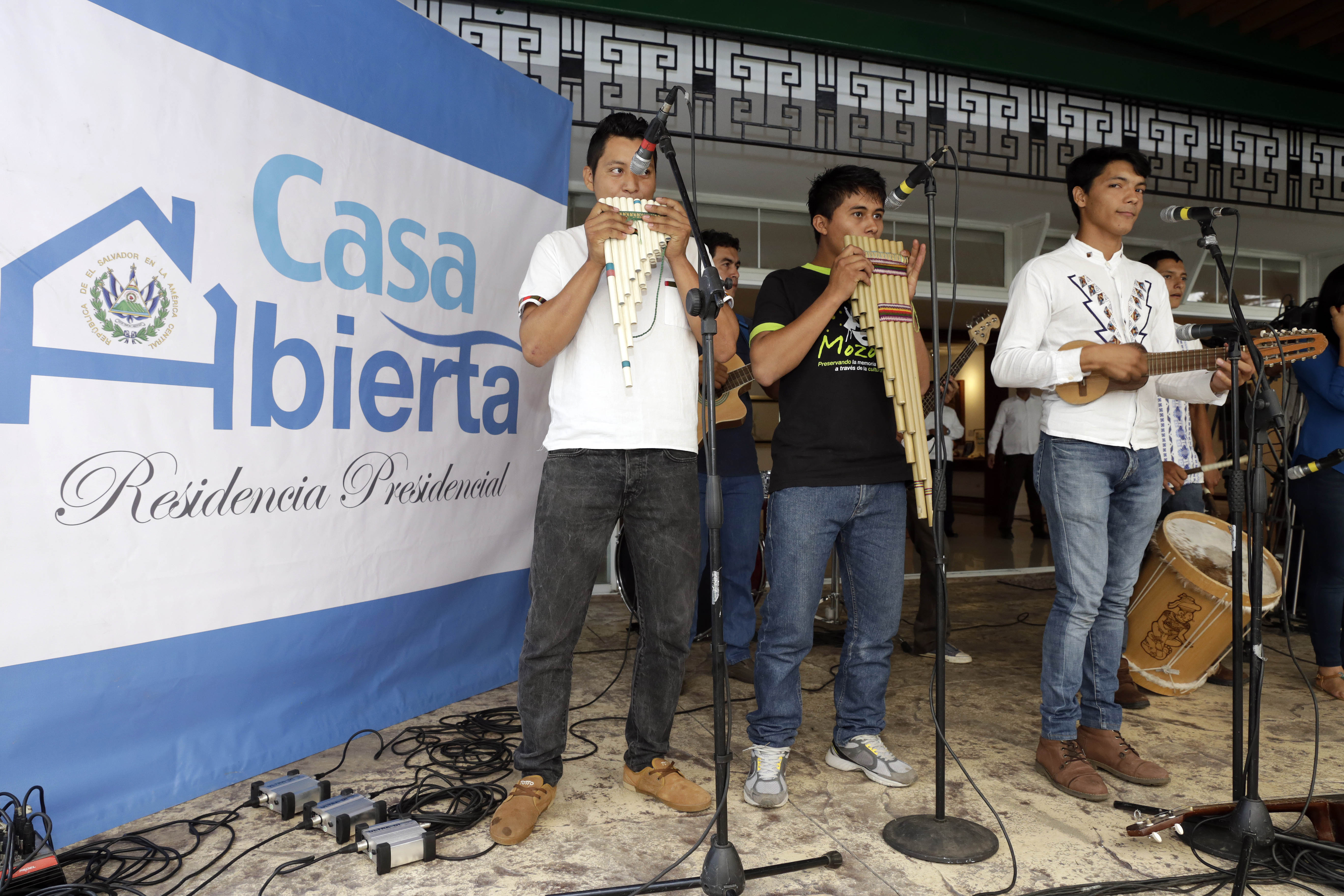
Salvadoran indigenous musicians

Marimba Centroamericana was one of the marimba bands popular in El Salvador and abroad. The first radio station in El Salvador, which was government-owned, played waltz, foxtrot, rancheras, sones, and songos, along with tangos. El Salvadoran musicians created their own versions of these styles. Another early marimba band was Marimba Atlacatl, founded by Francisco Antonio Beltran in 1917. He toured the world in the 1930s, and in 1935, won an award, presented by the Prince of Wales and his fiancée Wallis Simpson, at the Palm Beach Casino on the Azul Coast of France.

== The Music of Northern El Salvador ==
Northern El Salvador is composed of the departments of Chalatenango, Cabañas, Morazán and the northern parts of Santa Ana (e.g., Metapán), San Miguel (e.g., Cd. Barrios) and La Unión (e.g., Nueva Esparta) as well as the town of Suchitoto in the department of Cuscatlán. Northern El Salvador or la Franja Norte is characterized by its mountainous and cool terrain as well as being an area of heavy European settlement and as a result a large majority of the people who inhabit the Northern Region (especially Chalatenango, Metapán, and Morazán) are light-skinned people with colored eyes. The impact they have had on the local culture has been great and the music of Northern El Salvador clearly reflects the European influence in the area.

Chanchona Music

Music from the northern department of Morazán is lively and upbeat with simple lyrics that describe country life, love, and working in the fields. It usually consists of a double bass (chanchona in Salvadoran Spanish, a local word for a female hog, due to its sow-like appearance), two guitars, and two violins. Nowadays, congas and cowbells are added to the mix to produce sounds similar to cumbias. Chanchona music is popular in Eastern El Salvador and it is present there in most of their civic parades and religious holidays. Popular chanchona acts include: la Chanchona de Tito Mira, la Chanchona de Arcadio, Rayos de Oriente, Sonora Santa Marta, and Los Torogoces de Morazán.

Zafacaite

In the northern department of Chalatenango a popular form of music and fandango-type-of-dance was called zafacaite. The term is a compound word composed of the word zafa, from zafar(to loosen) and caite— a Salvadoran term for shoes. It was called so because of the fast and intricate foot stepping down when dancing the music that tended to make ones shoes fly off. The music consisted of a duo or trio playing a guitar, accordion, and violin or sometimes just an accordion and violin but always to a fast-paced rhythm. Popular songs and dances included "La Raspa" ("The Scrape") and "El Levanta Polvo" ("The Dust Lifter").

== Native American indigenous music ==
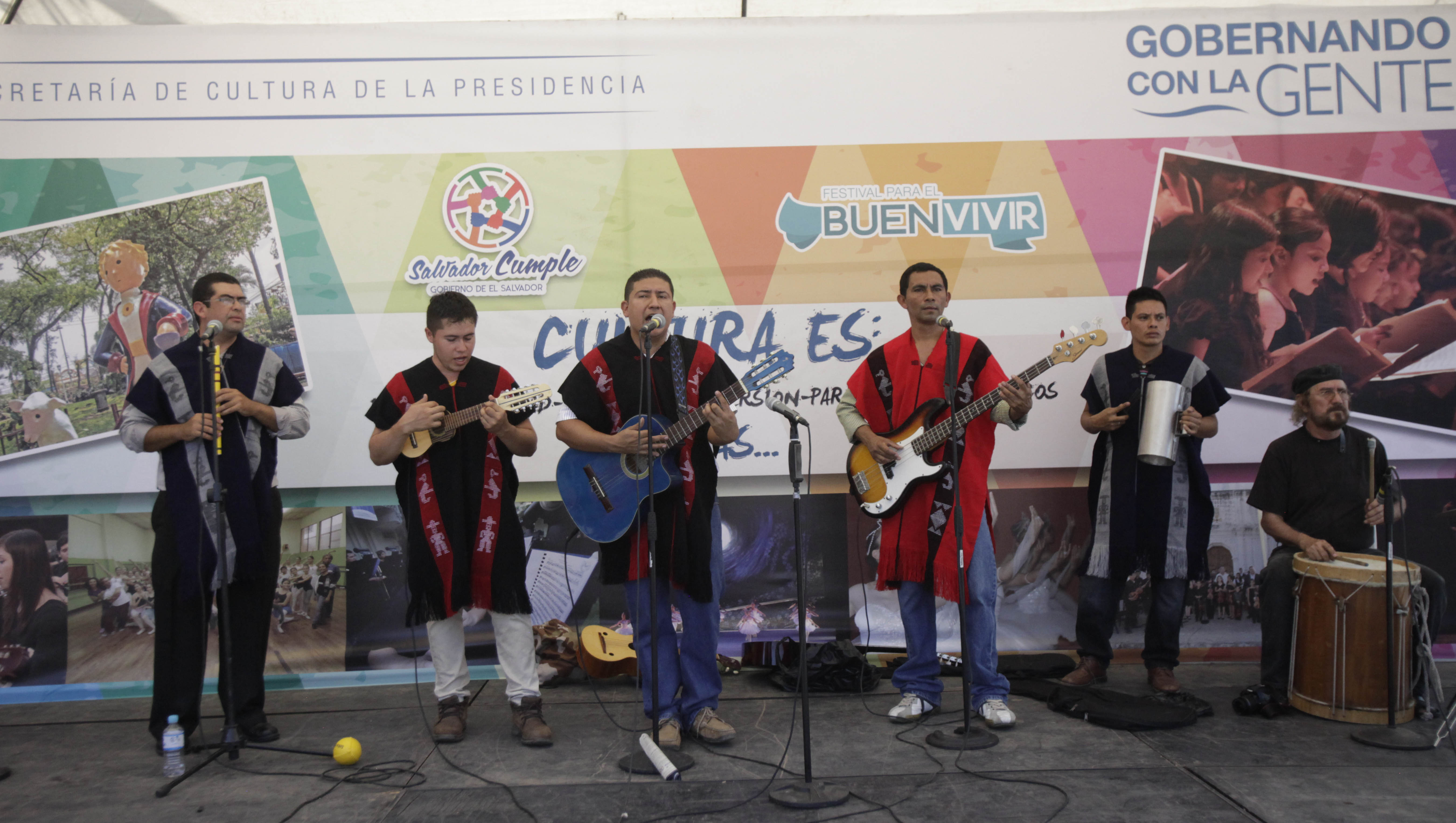
Indigenous Salvadoran musical group

Inspired by Ambient music, Indigenous music is influenced by the Native American indigenous Lenca, Cacaopera, and Pipil of El Salvador, and especially the Mayan people of the Mesoamerican region in Central America, are a staple in Salvadoran music. Many indigenous music groups such as (Talticpac), have risen in El Salvador, especially after the civil war. Many groups get inspiration from native indigenous music or themes from South and North American.

== Salvadoran marching bands ==
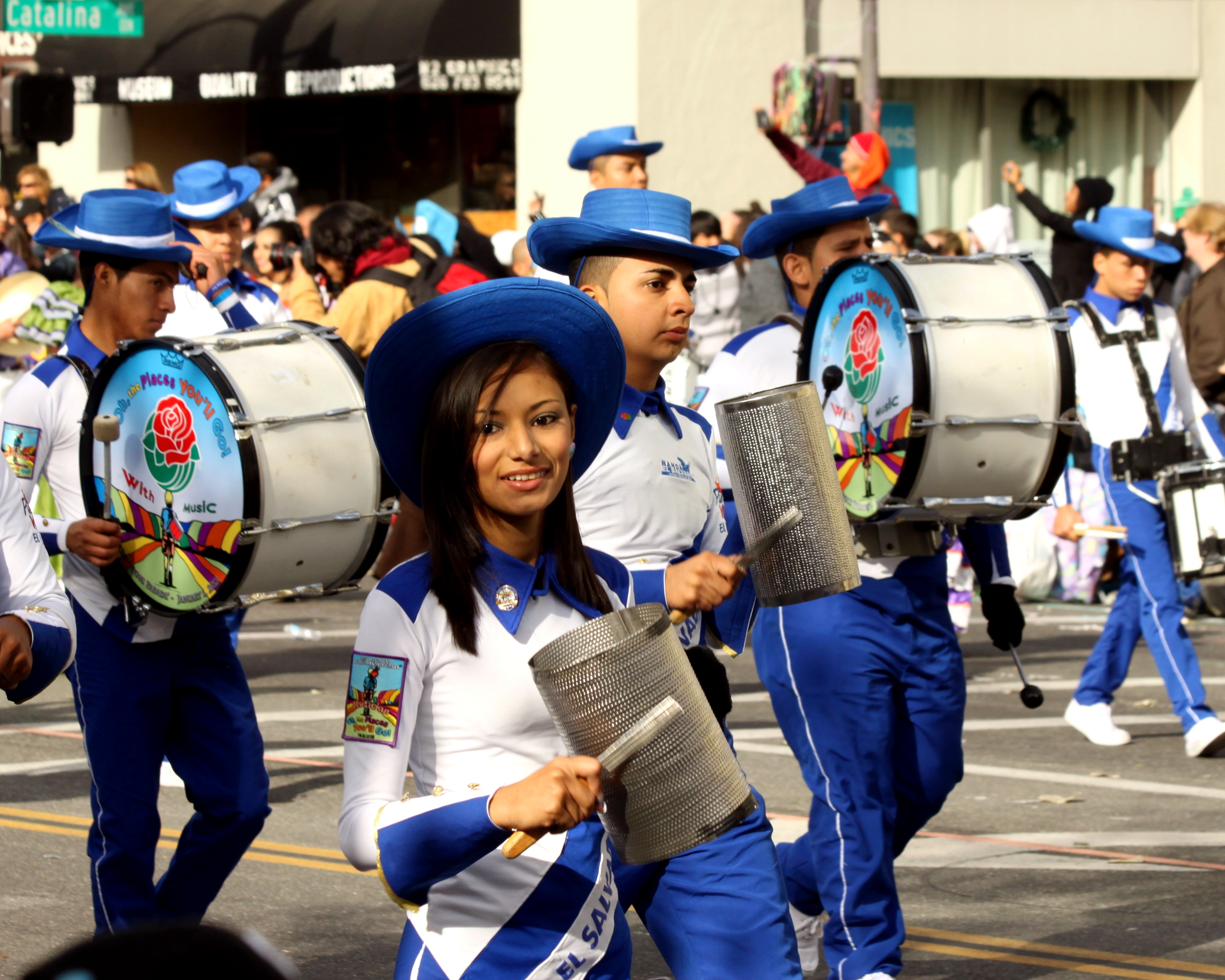
Banda El Salvador participating in the Rose Parade in 2013

School and military marching bands are a staple in El Salvador and it is a vital and crucial part of Salvadoran youth culture, whether in town or cities. Salvadoran marching bands are present in any kind of Salvadoran events, celebrations, and even in small activities, they become present along with their (cachiporristas) cheerleaders. Marching bands are a representative of Salvadoran culture and tradition, music tunes will include anything from national anthem, folkloric music to dance music like cumbia.

Marching bands in El Salvador were once called "war bands". After the peace accords that ended the civil war were signed, the named was changed to "peace bands". The Salvadoran marching bands have even made international appearances in events such as the Rose Parade in the U.S city of Pasadena in New Years, the first time in 2008 and the most recent in 2013, where the Salvadoran marching bands of boys and girls have been able to embrace their talents to the world.

== Salvadoran Civil War songs ==
Salvadoran Civil War songs located in the nueva cancion movement and genre, have been very popular since the 1970- to present day. They were broadcast through Radio Venceremos station and appealed to the majority of the peasant Salvadoran population. One of the most well known songs is "El Salvador ta venciendo" by Yolocamba Ita, as well as American songs like "U.S get out of El Salvador" dedicated to the U.S. involvement.

== Salvadoran cumbia ==
Salvadoran cumbia is a staple in Salvadoran music. Groups such as Orquesta San Vicente who sing (Soy Salvadoreño), the Bravo group who sing (Sabrosa Cumbia) and the Hermanos Flores group who sing (Mi Pais) are three well known cumbia music groups in El Salvador.

== Salvadoran rock and hip hop/rap ==
Rock and hip hop are well established music genres in Salvadoran culture. Salvadoran rock has a history dating back before the civil war. Salvadoran hip hop arrived after the civil war and it is seen as a result of the Salvadoran exodus, diaspora, immigration and deportation from the United States, especially from cities such as Los Angeles and Washington D.C. Joaquin Santos, Crooked Stilo and Code Blue are just some of the most well known Salvadoran hip hop groups.

Foreign rock bands from the U.S and other parts of the world are also very welcomed and listened in El Salvador. Many foreign rock groups dedicated songs to El Salvador and the Salvadoran people during the civil war, songs such as "Bullet the Blue Sky" by U2, "El Salvador" by White Lion, and "Weapons for El Salvador" by The Ex were all inspired by the U.S. involvement in the El Salvador War.

== Popular music and instruments ==
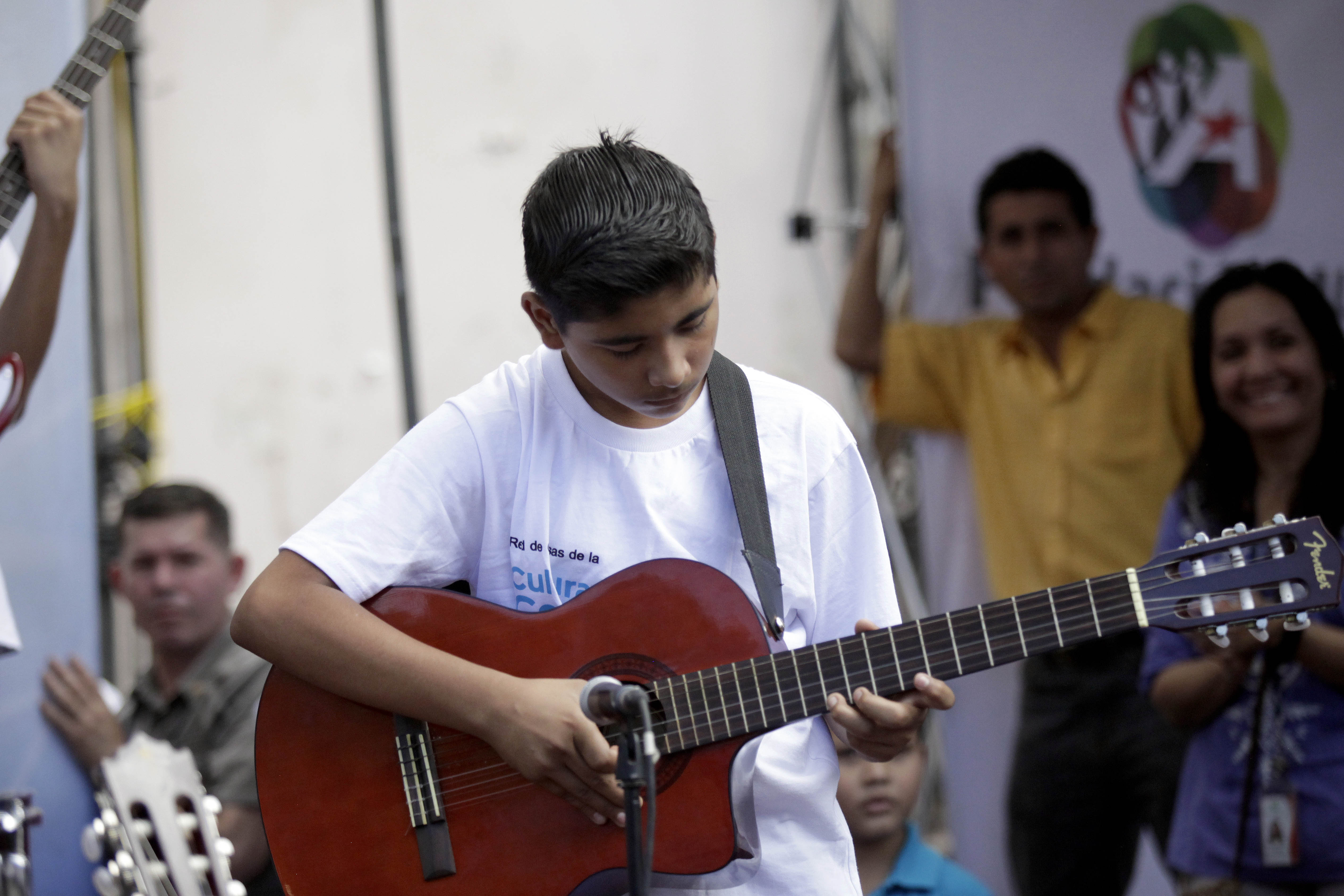
Salvadoran boy playing the guitar

Popular music in El Salvador uses xylophones, tubular bells, fanfare trumpets, guitars, double bass, harmonica, glass harmonica, pianos, flutes, drums, scrapers, gourds, and theremin. Indigenous instruments such as drum and flutes are a standard in all Salvadoran music used as a solidarity with El Salvador indigenous ancestry. "El Sombrero Azul," for example, is a cumbia song by Salsa Clave which starts with an indigenous tune. Tubular bells are a cue for El Salvador's Christianity and majestic fanfare trumpets for El Salvador's national pride, the national anthem itself start off with majestic fanfare trumpets.

Music from Colombia mainly and other Caribbean, South American and Central American music has infiltrated the country, especially salsa and cumbia. For example, the famous La Sonora Dinamita is a Colombian cumbia group with one Salvadoran vocalist (Susana Velasques). As one of the first Cumbia groups to reach international success, it is credited with helping to popularize the genre throughout Latin America, and the world.

Political chaos tore the country apart in the early 20th century, and music was often suppressed, especially those with strong native influences. In the 1940s, for example, it was decreed that a dance called "Xuc" was to be the "national dance" which was created and led by Paquito Palaviccini's and his "Orquesta Internacional Polio." That was one of the many orchestras he led during and in the mid-1940s, his other hit was known throughout the country. "Carnaval En San Miguel" was commonly known to the whole country as the first Salvadoran band that went on to receive numerous awards in the years to come. Paquito Palaviccini, being known throughout Central and South America, made tours to Cuba, Buenos Aires, where Paquito Studied, and other Latin American countries.

The inspiration came to Paquito to develop the "Xuc" and "El Baile del Torito" in a tour they had in Cuba. The 1960s saw an influx of American and British pop and rock, inspiring like-minded Salvadoran bands, while the following two decades were dominated by a wave of popular genres from across Latin America, mostly folk-based singer-songwriter genres like Chile and Nueva Canción. This new type of Salvadoran rock music was called "Guanarock" (portmanteau of Guanaco, a nickname demonym slang Salvadorans use to refer to themselves which comes from the word Guanacasco which means "gathering brotherhood" in Poton Lenca Mesoamerican language, and rock), which inspired bands such as Ayutush.

Dominican merengue and bachata also became very popular. In the last ten years, hip hop and reggaeton has influenced the majority of the Salvadoran youth, which has formed groups like Pescozada and Mecate. Also former Reggaeton producers like Wilfredo Rivas (Dj Emsy) and Jose Castaneda (Mambo King) who had worked with vary of famous Reggaeton and Hip hop artists such as: Dj Flex, Cheka, The Black Eyed Peas, Nicky Jam, El Torito and many others.

Salvadoran cumbia is related to but very distinct from Colombian cumbia, which is better known outside of El Salvador. Chanchona ensembles, led by a pair or a single violin, are popular, especially among the immigrant community in the Washington D.C. area.

=== Alternative music ===
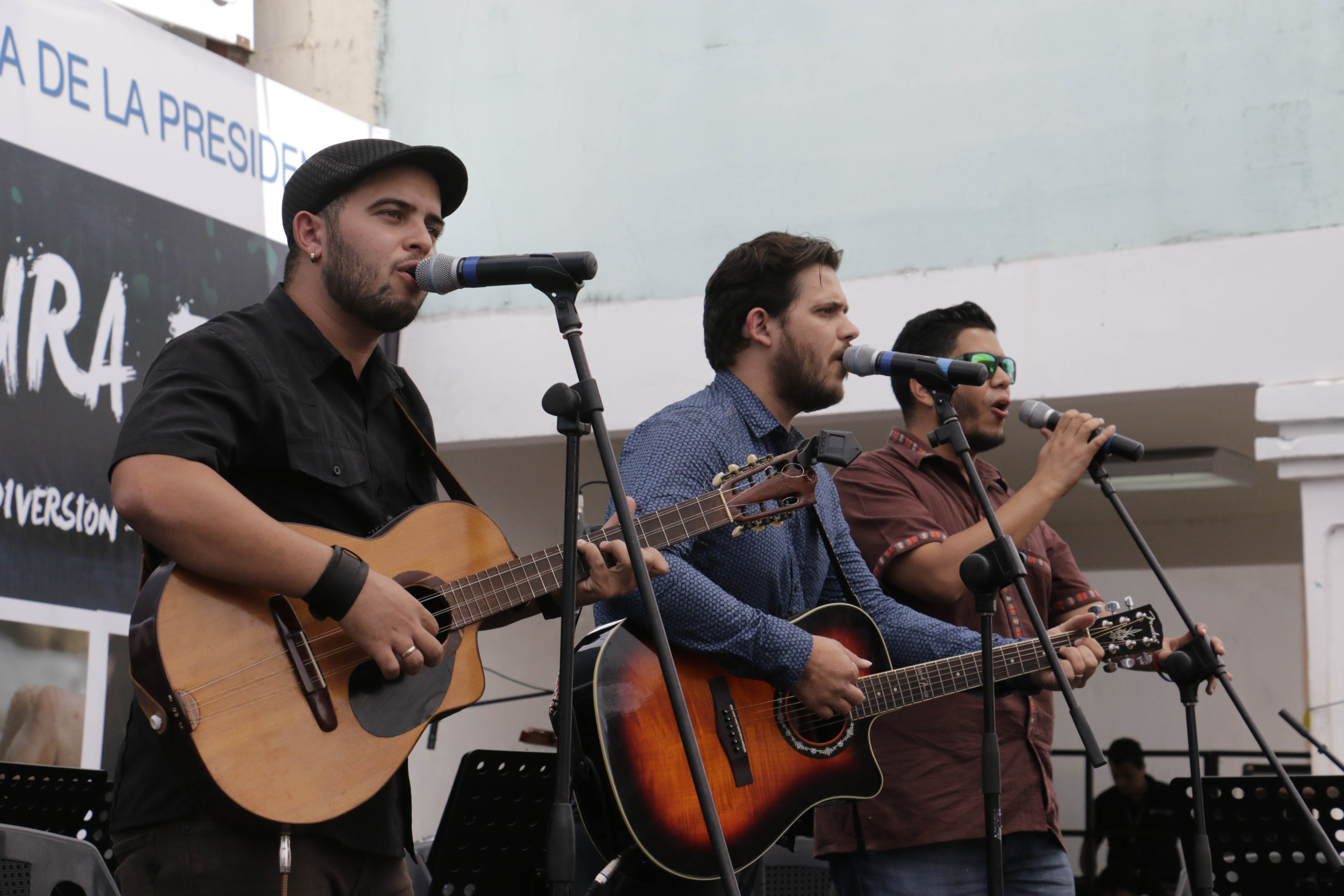
Salvadoran musical group in San Vicente

El Salvador has prominent heavy metal, reggae, ska, dubstep, punk and electronic dance scenes due to its prolific local bands and venues; and the recent increase in local concerts by international bands that include San Salvador as a frequent destination in their international tours. Anastasio y los del Monte was widely lauded for bringing reggae to El Salvador.

=== Salvadoran pop music ===
El Salvador has a vibrant pop scene, with artists such as Analu Dada, Shaka y Dres and Cris Mejia. Blending traditional Salvadoran sounds with hip hop, reggaeton and electronic, it is popular among the country's youth.

== Art music ==
The main composer of the 19th century was José Escolástico Andrino (born in Guatemala). Wenceslao García was the first native composer. Important military bands composers and arrangers include Jesús Alas, Alejandro Muñoz and Domingo Santos. María de Baratta was an important ethnomusicologist and composer in the 20th century.

== Notable Salvadoran musicians ==
- Erick Gudiel Saxofonista
- Ricardo Cabrera Martínez
- David Granadino
- Carlos Irigoyen Ruiz
- Juan Isolino Rosa
- Ciriaco de Jesús Alas
- Francisco "Pancho" Lara
- Francisco Palaviccini
- Esteban Servellón
- Benjamín Solís Menéndez
- Mario Roberto Zuñiga
- Alex Panamá
- German Cáceres
- Analu Dada
