= 1856 in music =

== Events ==
- January – Evan James and his son James James write the words and music of Hen Wlad Fy Nhadau, which later becomes the Welsh national anthem.
- January 6 – Charles Gounod is awarded the Légion d'Honneur.
- January 27 – In recognition of Wolfgang Amadeus Mozart's 100th birthday, Franz Liszt conducts a concert of his music in Vienna.
- March 23 – Richard Wagner completes the score of Die Walküre.
- March 24 – The Théâtre de la Monnaie opens in Brussels.
- May 15 – Following his discovery of the philosophy of Arthur Schopenhauer and his growing interest in Buddhist philosophy, Wagner drafts a brief summary of a proposed Buddhist opera, called Die Sieger (The Victors). At about the same time he changes the ending of the Ring cycle, and changes the titles of Der junge Siegfried and Siegfried’s Tod to Siegfried and Götterdämmerung respectively.
- May 28 – Mikhail Glinka relocates to Berlin.
- July 4 – 14-year-old Arthur Sullivan wins the Mendelssohn Scholarship, enabling him to study at the Royal Academy of Music.
- July 28 – Clara Schumann and Johannes Brahms begin their vigil outside the bedroom of the dying Robert Schumann.
- December 1 – Bedřich Smetana opens his new music school in Göteborg.
- Foundation of the Teatro de la zarzuela by Francisco Asenjo Barbieri.
- In St Petersburg, Russia, Mily Balakirev (the leader) meets César Cui, as the first two Russian composers of The Mighty Five. In October, Mussorgsky meets Alexander Borodin while both men serve at a military hospital in Saint Petersburg.
- The words of the "Himno Nacional de El Salvador" are written by General Juan José Cañas; it becomes the National Anthem of El Salvador in 1953.

== Published popular music ==
- Stephen Foster – "Gentle Annie"
- Benjamin Hanby – "Darling Nelly Gray"

== Classical music ==
- Franz Abt – 3 Lieder, Op.137
- Mily Balakirev
  - Piano Concerto No. 1 in F-sharp minor, Op. 1 (in one movement)
  - Fandango-Etude
  - Scherzo No.1
- Alexandre-Pierre-François Boëly – 12 Pièces pour orgue, Op.18
- William B. Bradbury – Esther, the Beautiful Queen (oratorio)
- Johannes Brahms – Prelude and Fugue, WoO 9
- Anton Bruckner
  - Ave Maria, WAB 5
  - Psalm 146, WAB 37
  - Klavierstück, WAB 119
- Antonín Dvořák – Polka Pomnenka
- Louis Gottschalk – Grande Valse poétique concertante for voice and piano
- Charles Gounod – Laudate Dominum [CG 105]
- Miska Hauser – Ballad (Dedicated to Lady MacDonnell of South Australia)
- Ignaz Lachner – Piano Trio No.2, Op.45
- Ernst Pauer – Quintet for Piano and Winds, Op.44
- Camille Saint-Saëns – Symphony in F major "Urbs Roma"
- Robert Schumann – 2 Endenicher Choräle
- William Vincent Wallace – "The Winds that Waft My Sighs to Thee"

== Opera ==
- Alexander Dargomyzhsky – Rusalka
- Aimé Maillart – Les Dragons de Villars
- Giovanni Pacini – Margherita Pusterla

== Musical theater ==
- Hiawatha. Broadway production opened at Wallack's Lyceum Theatre on December 25 and ran for 24 performances.
- Novelty (Music: Thomas Baker). Broadway production opened at Laura Keene's Variety House on February 22.

== Births ==
- January 6 – Giuseppe Martucci, composer (d. 1909)
- January 9 – Stevan Mokranjac, composer (d. 1914)
- January 11
  - Christian Sinding, composer (d. 1941)
  - Francisco D'Andrade, opera singer (d. 1921)
- March 20 – Josef Wagner, military bandmaster and composer (d.1908)
- April 14 – Antonie Mielke, soprano (d. 1907)
- May 3 – Max Alvary, Wagnerian tenor (d. 1898)
- May 20 – Helen Hopekirk, composer (died 1945)
- May 26 – George Templeton Strong, composer and artist (d. 1948)
- May 31 – F. W. Meacham, composer (died 1909)
- circa July 29 – Felix Mottl, conductor (died 1911)
- September 3 – Selma Ek, soprano (d. 1941)
- October 22 – Eduard Schütt, composer (died 1933)
- November 25 – Sergey Taneyev, composer (died 1915)
- December 2 – Robert Kajanus, conductor and composer (d. 1933)
- December 20 – Ferdinand Avenarius, poet and lyricist, relative of Richard Wagner (d. 1923)

== Deaths ==
- January 6 – Nicolas-Charles Bochsa, harpist (born 1789)
- January 17 – Thomas Attwood Walmisley, composer and organist (d. 1814)
- January 28 – Helmina von Chézy, librettist (born 1783)
- May 3 – Adolphe Adam, French composer (d. 1803)
- June 3 – Stephen Jenks, song writer (born 1772)
- July 20 – Anna Nielsen, mezzo-soprano (d. 1803)
- July 29 – Robert Schumann, composer (d. 1810)
- August 5 – Robert Lucas de Pearsall, composer (d. 1795)
- August 8 – Lucia Elizabeth Vestris, actress and singer (d. 1797)
- August 21 – Peter Josef von Lindpaintner, conductor and composer (d. 1791)
- October 14 – Johann Kaspar Mertz, guitarist and composer (d. 1806)
- November 23 – Giovanni Morandi, composer (d. 1777)
- December 31 – Domenico Crivelli, music teacher
- date unknown – Ashutosh Deb, Hindu musician and composer
