= List of Salvadoran hip-hop musicians =

This is a list of hip hop musicians from El Salvador.

== Rappers ==
- El Travieso
- El Seko
- Pescozada
- Reyes del Bajo Mundo
- Crooked Stilo
- Mecate
- T-Bone
- Brayan Hernandez-Galdamez

== Producers ==
- Omnionn
- Crooked Stilo
