= Xuc =

Genre of Salvadoran folk music

- Stylistic origins: Indigenous music of El Salvador, African music, Spanish music, Music of Cuba
- Cultural origins: 1940s, Cojutepeque, El Salvador
- Typical instruments: Sackbut; drum; saxophone; clarinet

Xuc
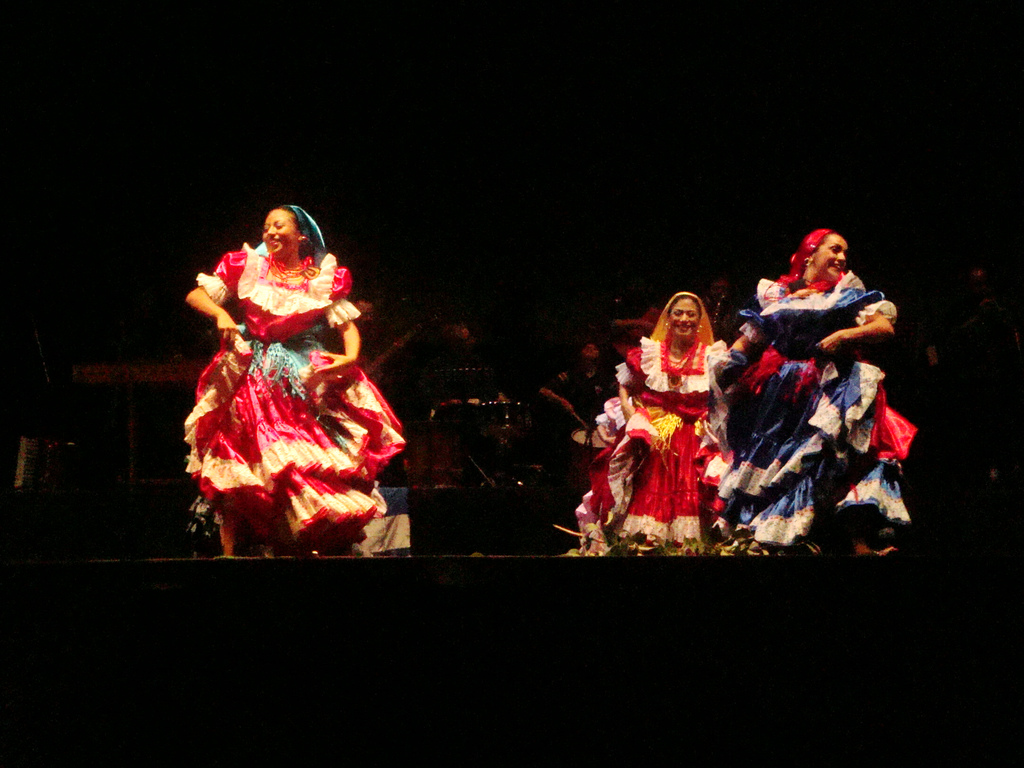
- Folkloric Ballet of El Salvador during a presentation in 2007
- Genre: Folk dance
- Time signature: 2/4

Xuc (Spanish: [suk]), also known as Salvadoran folk music, is a musical genre and later a typical dance of El Salvador, which was created and popularized by Francisco "Paquito" Palaviccini in Cojutepeque, located in the department of Cuscatlán in 1942.

In June 2019, a request to declare xuc as a Cultural Heritage of El Salvador was submitted to the Legislative Assembly of El Salvador, which is still in process.

== Origins ==
The name "xuc", originates from a Salvadoran instrument called juco or juque, a typical wind instrument, which sounds "xuc, xuc" when played. Usually xuc is composed in 2/4 time.

This rhythm was born with the famous 1942 Salvadoran song "Adentro Cojutepeque" and was composed in honor of the sugar cane festivals. The representative album of this genre is El Xuc, published in 1962 by Orquesta Internacional Polío under the direction of Palaviccini.

Some of the most emblematic songs of this rhythm are: "El Carnaval de San Miguel", "El Xuc", "Santa Ana", "El Cocotero", "El Torito", "El Candelareño", "El Cuarto Carnaval de San Miguel", "Vamos Usulután", and "Ensalada a la Palaviccini".

== Choreography ==
In 1958, sixteen years after the creation of xuc, the first choreography was created, which is composed of a dynamic dance, essentially described in the following steps:

1. Heel-toe-heel positions with right and left foot, combined with small jumps, as a first step.
2. Keep your feet stretched by moving them back and forth (crossed), walking with several short distance jumps, the woman is shown characterizing herself by transmitting joy to the movement of the feet, the skirt of the suit (regularly typical) and the head, depending on the side towards which the step is oriented. The man regularly moves with his hands inside the front pants bags (regularly made of cotton or ixtle fabric), during the dance the dancers make wheels holding hands and with stretched arms, at the same time that they advance and flirt with each other, this without missing a beat.

The choreography was staged by a dancer belonging to the Salvadoran dance group Morena Celarie and was done within the framework of the patron saint festivities at the famous San Miguel Carnival.
