= Ciriaco de Jesús Alas =

Salvadoran musician and composer

- Born: April 7, 1866; Santa Tecla, El Salvador
- Died: 1952 (aged 85–86) Sonsonate, El Salvador
- Genres: Classical
- Occupations: Musician, composer
- Instrument: Violin

Ciriaco de Jesús Alas (April 7, 1866, in Santa Tecla, El Salvador – 1952 in Sonsonate) was a Salvadoran musician and composer.

He studied the violin with Rafael Olmedo and Juan Aberle, composer of the National Anthem of El Salvador, at the Liceo de San Luis. He also studied under the Dutchman José Kessels. He served as professor of singing at the Central Institute of El Salvador. He was director of the Banda de La Unión, 1888–1890, and Banda del Regimiento de Sonsonate (Sonsonate Regiment Band) from 1901 to 1944. Among his works are "El maestro Irma", "Neo Cadina", "Rosita", "Fantasía sobre motivos de la Caballería Rusticana", "Fantasía sobre motivos de El Trobador", and "La coronación".
