= Mecate =

Mecate can refer to:

- Mecate (rein)
- Mecate (band)
