= Salvadoran hip-hop =

Music genre or scene

Salvadoran rap or Guanaco hip-hop is a type of rap music that comes from El Salvador. It arose in the late 1990s, with releases from groups such as Reyes del Bajo Mundo, Pescozada and Mecate. It is a blend of hip hop with Salvadorian music, and followed the migration of people from El Salvador to Los Angeles.

== See also ==
- List of Salvadoran hip-hop musicians
