= Omnionn =

Salvadoran musician

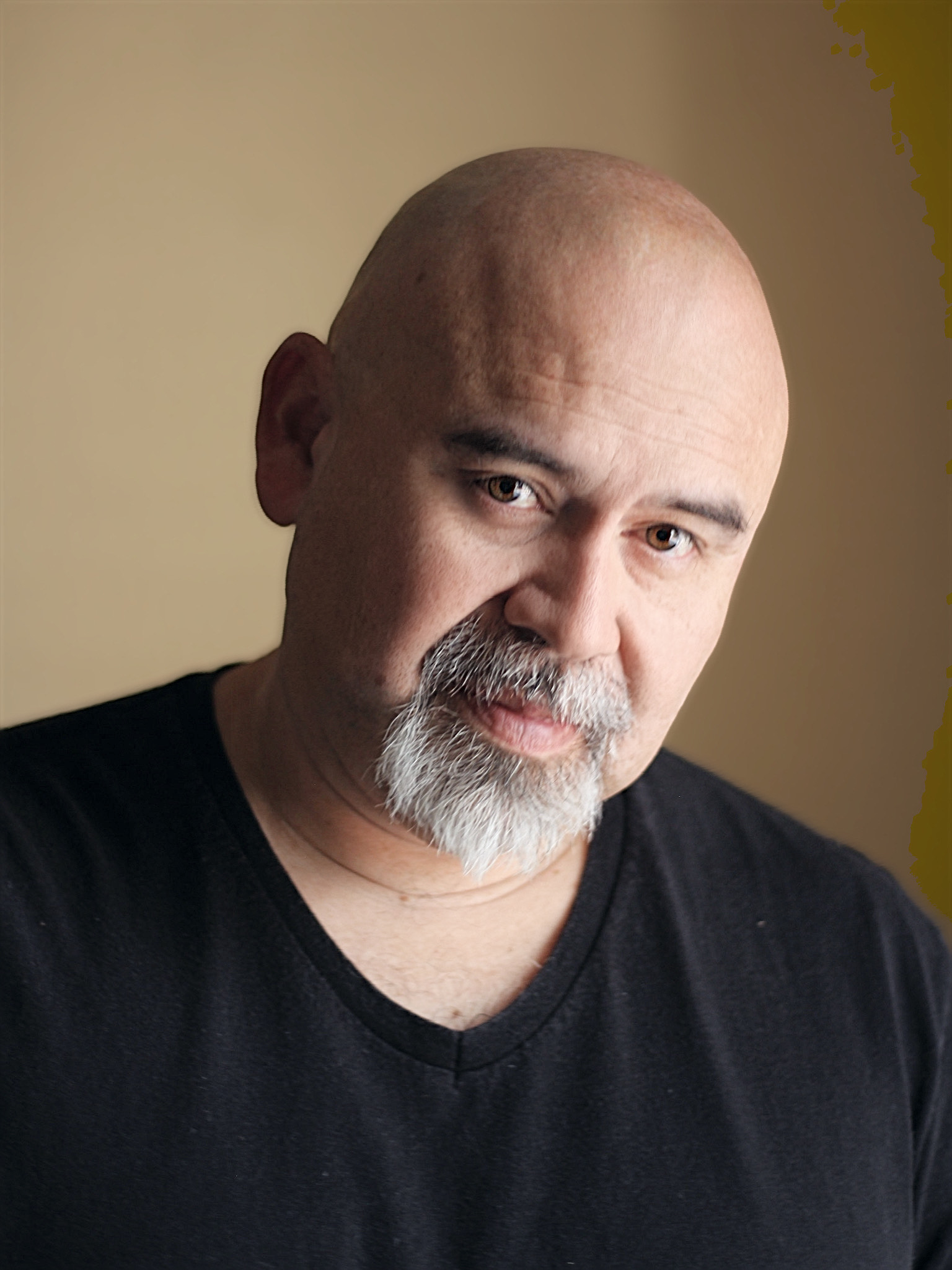
- Omnionn in 2021

Omnionn is a music producer of Salvadoran music. He is particularly active in the Salvadoran hip hop scene, where he is the official producer of Pescozada. He is also widely known as an artist of Electronic music. Ominonn resided in San Francisco, California for most of his life, but has dedicated himself to help establish an urban music scene in El Salvador, and in 2006 moved back to his home country.

Originally from the department or province of Ahuachapán, in the west side of El Salvador, Omnionn (Agustin Anaya) has and continues to be one of the most progressive and innovative producers of hip hop and electronica in Latin America. He has credits in both genres on both sides of the atlantic and has worked with groups/artists like Dos Hermanos, Zion I, Sindicato del Hip Hop Argentino, Apollo 11, Planet Asia, Sean T, and is very active in the remixing world of electronic music.

In 2003, Omnionn co-founded the music marketing firm and record label The Assembly Line/Glifico in partnership with San Francisco Bay Area hip hop producer Ghazi Shami and Nora Anaya Tejada. The firm has become the most active label outside of El Salvador to promote and market Salvadoran urban music.

In 2004, Omnionn made contact with an independent and obscure hip hop group in the department of Chalatenango, El Salvador called "Pescozada", formed at the time by three young men with a passion to make hip hop music in one of the most rural and politically isolated areas of the country. The project intrigued the producer and he began taking the group under his wing, releasing a crunk remix of Pescozada's "Quieres Mierda?" previously released in the album "Diaz Ozkuros en el Barrio" (2002). After several remixes, assessment and market analysis, Omnionn was able to propose focusing more label resources to build what has become the most successful and known hip hop project in Central America.

In 2006 he left the United States to personally supervise Pescozada's international marketing and music production from El Salvador and produce other upcoming hip hop projects, amongst them 4 Manifestantes, Real Akademia and Palomacho, and produce several compilations of "Salvadorian Hip Hop".

In 2007 Omnionn officially joined Pescozada as producer, DJ and third member of the group. In October 2020, he announced his retirement from the group in his official Facebook page.

== International press ==
Omnionn has been successful at putting Salvadoran urban music in the forefront of the international press. An article from Spain's Hip Hop Nation magazine wrote "The element that grabs the most attention in Pescozada is not the vocal parts, rather the music production." The article continues, "The result of [Omnionn's] involvement as far as the quality of mixes, and the level of detail in his beats put Pescozada in a clear advantage compared to the vast majority of the groups in Latin America, which for the most part, do not count with the tools to reach that level of sound."
