= Adentro Cojutepeque =

1942 song by Francisco Palaviccini

Single by Orquesta Internacional Polío

from the album El Xuc
- Released: 1962
- Recorded: 1962
- Genre: Xuc
- Length: 2:36
- Label: RCA Victor
- Songwriter(s): Francisco Palaviccini

"Adentro Cojutepeque" is a song written and composed in 1942 by Salvadoran singer-composer Francisco Palaviccini, creator of the Salvadoran genre xuc. It was composed for the Cojutepeque's Sugarcane Celebration (Fiestas de la Caña de Azúcar).

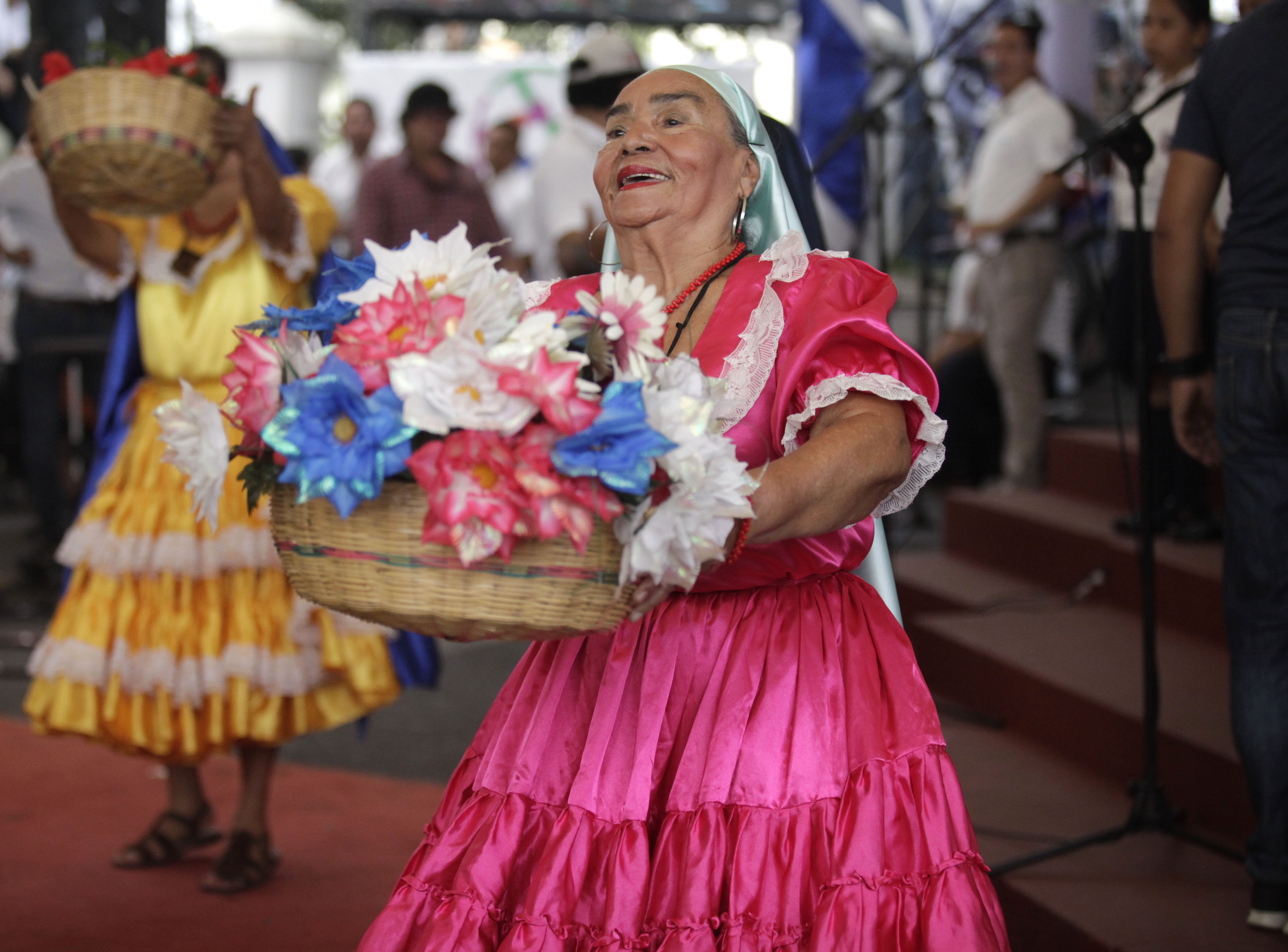
Typical Dance Inside Cojutepeque at the Festival for Good Living and Governing with the Chalchuapa People.

This song was released during the patron saint festivities of Cojutepeque, held in January 1958. The song was performed by Orquesta Internacional Polío, with Palaviccini as its conductor. "Adentro Cojutepeque" has become a cultural reference for El Salvador since it was the first xuc song composed. This version, with Gil Medinas's voice, is widely recognized as part of the popular music of El Salvador.

The song was recorded and included in his 1962 album El Xuc.

== Background ==
Cojutepeque had been chosen as the provisional capital between 1854 and 1858, due to the earthquake of April 16, 1854, that destroyed the city of San Salvador. This caused an increase in political activity in that town, since between 1856 and 1857 the population of Cojutepeque left Nicaragua with the Salvadoran army to support the campaign against William Walker, which would be called the Central American National War. When Francisco Palaviccini visited Cojutepeque, he was amazed for its history, and it inspired him to compose his first xuc, "Adentro Cojutepeque".

== Personnel ==
Credits adapted from El Xuc liner notes.

- Gil Medina: lead vocals
- José Max Cañas: saxophone
- Julio C. Tario: saxophone
- Francisco Palaviccini: alto saxophone
- Alberto Ramos: saxophone
- Antonio Linares: baritone saxophone
- Efraín García: trumpet
- Luis Cáceres: trumpet
- Orlando Rivera: trumpet
- Emigdio Alfaro: trombone
- Héctor Lucero: trombone
- Raúl Portillo: piano
- Francisco Santos: bass
- Ricardo Loza: drums
- Meme Aguilar: tumbadoras
