= Carlos Irigoyen Ruiz =

Salvadoran conductor and composer

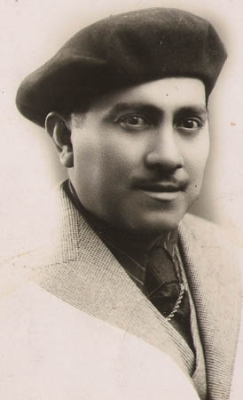
- Born: 2 May 1903; El Salvador
- Died: 22 March 1947 (aged 43); El Salvador
- Occupations: Musician, conductor/director
- Years active: 1920–1947

Carlos Irigoyen Ruiz (2 May 1903 – 22 March 1947) was a renowned Salvadoran musician during the 1920s-1940s. He directed the philharmonic and owned several of the most renowned marimba bands performing at the national and international level at the time.

== Biography ==
Carlos Irigoyen Ruiz was born 2 May 1903 in San Salvador, El Salvador to a family of Basque descent. Though his father's family did not have a tradition of professional musicians, his father's mother, Carmen Irigoyen, was a music lover and encouraged Carlos and his brother José. José moved to Panama to pursue a musical career, and Carlos began studying law at the University of El Salvador. After 2 years, he abandoned a legal profession and returned to music, attending classes at the Salvadoran School of Music) and taking private music lessons in both El Salvador and Guatemala. He also studied languages, becoming proficient in English, French and German.

He created numerous marimba bands, including Irigoyen Marimba Central, Marimba Central, El Salvador Country Club, Salvadoran Marimba, New World Marimba, and traveled extensively throughout Latin America, the US and Europe. Irigoyen was a director of the philharmonic and taught multiple instruments. He recorded 78 rpm acetate records for RCA Victor of his compositions.

Irigoyen died at age 43 in San Salvador and he was buried in the Cemetery of San Salvador Los Illustrious; his wife Paquita as she was known, died 38 years later, on May 10, 1985.
