= José Kessels =

Dutch musician & composer (1856–1928)

- Pieter Jozef Frans Kessels
- Born: Pieter Jozef Frans Kessels; October 30, 1856; Heerlen, Netherlands
- Died: February 10, 1928 (aged 71); Santa Ana, El Salvador
- Burial place: Cementerio Santa Isabel
- Monuments: Parque José Kessels
- Occupations: Musician and composer

José Kessels (30 October 1856 – 10 February 1928), born Pieter Jozef Frans Kessels, was a Dutch musician and composer who settled and worked in El Salvador. He is known for having been a teacher to various Salvadoran composers, notably David Granadino. A memorial and park in the central square of Santa Ana, El Salvador is dedicated to him.

== Life and career ==
Kessels was born on 30 October (Note: Letzer's Muzikaal Nederland and the Geïllustreerd muzieklexicon sets his date of birth on 31 October, but his birth registration states 30 October.) 1856 to Pieter Jozef Kessels and Maria Catharina Wetzels in Heerlen, Netherlands. He and his brother, Mathieu, were the only surviving middle two of six children. They are described as having been musically gifted and had music lessons at an early age. He began to take lessons from a local music teacher without his parents' knowledge, when this was discovered, his parents forbade him to take further lessons. He nevertheless continued studying and practicing several instruments in secret. He asked and gained permission from his parents to buy a cello and continue lessons if he won a prize from the Cologne lottery, and he did so with his prize of 50 guilders. He began to take lessons from Heerlen musician, L. Hennen. Hennen also gave him instruction in music theory. He is said to have begun composing at age 16. A music director from Aachen offered to allow Jos Kessels to continue his studies there, but he was not allowed by his parents until he was 18-years-old. He continued to receive music education for cello and brass wind instruments.

The Kessels brothers eventually began to trade in sheet music, founding a music publishing company in their hometown in 1880. Jos Kessels began working as a conductor for singing associations and concert bands. He was appointed as a solo cellist for the Tivoli Theatre in Amsterdam in 1883, but soon left to focus on composition which appealed to him more. Kessels moved to Tilburg in 1884 to become the conductor of the Nieuwe Koninklijke Harmonie (transl. New Royal Concert Band). On 6 September 1885, he and his brother were made honorary members of the newly inaugurated Musis Sacrum concert hall in Dongen. His brother joined him in Tilburg in 1886 and eventually became a successful entrepreneur in musical instrument manufacturing; Mathieu is also notable for being the father of Marietje Kessels, the victim of a controversial unsolved murder. Jos continued working as a conductor and composer in the same city.

By 1889, he had composed 2 symphonies, around 30 overtures, various fantasies, waltzes, genre pieces, and marches, as well as choral works for orchestras and without orchestras, masses, and cantatas. The same year, he was working on an opera called Walram.

In 1891, he settled in Belgium where he first worked as a music publisher for Le Metronome in Brussels and then as a musician. In 1895, he wrote the Triomphmars Oranje Nassau (transl. Oranje Nassau Triumphal March) in honor of the visit of the Princess Wilhelmina and Queen Emma. He also served as the conductor for the Oisterwijk concert band, Asterius.

=== In El Salvador ===
In 1896, he emigrated to El Salvador and settled in the city of Santa Ana, leaving behind his wife and child. It was rumored that his wife in Europe was having an affair with composer Franz Liszt, but writer Martin van der Walls of the Tilburg heritage magazine, Erfgoed Tilburg, wrote that this was highly unlikely. In El Salvador, he married Concepción Morán, a native of Chalchuapa with whom he had several children.

Starting in 1896 and into the 1900s, Kessels was the director of the Banda Marcial of Santa Ana, which would often play in the city's parks and was recognized as the second most important military band in the country. In 1897, he would chose students from the music school directed by Daniel González and Pío Paredes González as new members for the band, including among them Filadelfo Mirón, Miguel Menéndez, Antonio Sánchez, Joaquín Alvarado, and David Granadino. He would also become a teacher of composition, and had the future composers David Granadino and Ciriaco de Jesus Alas as students.

On 4 October 1913, the Sociedad Musical Kessels (transl. Kessels Musical Society)was founded in the town of Concepción de Ataco to promote its members' advancement in music through the establishment of classes under the direction of a competent teacher.

Kessels retired in 1924 and was given the rank of colonel. He died in Santa Ana on 10 October 1928 and is buried in the Cementerio General Santa Isabel.

== Works ==
Kessels composed orchestral works, symphonies, overtures, fantasies, waltzes, genre pieces, and marches; he also composed choral works with and without orchestra, masses, cantatas, songs for one voice and songs for male choirs. He also composed hundreds of concert band and fanfare works.

=== Overtures ===
- Compulsory numbers of the competitions in Nijmegen (1887), Tilburg (1888), and Wageningen (1889).
- Obertura Romántica, played for the first time in 1897 in the Parque Bolívar, now Plaza Gerardo Barrios.

=== Waltzes ===
- Vreugdestralen, dedicated to King William III. For this he received a letter from the king.

=== Operas and operettas ===
- Two operas, including Walram (1889).
- Two operettas, including Per extra Trein (1892).

=== Orchestral works ===
- Abzug der Goten nach der Schlacht am Vesum, for male choir, solo and piano.
- Cortéje nocturne, played in the Parque Bolívar in 1899.

== Legacy ==
Salvadoran poet Alfonso Espino, father of poet Alfredo Espino, dedicated two poems (Monólogo de la música and Al artista José Kessels en la muerte de su hijo amado) in his 1919 anthology, Mármoles y bronces, to Kessels.

In the 1960s, the Junta de Progreso Local (transl. Local Progress Board) created a monument with Kessels' bust in a park named after him adjacent to the theater of Santa Ana and facing another monument with the bust of his former student, David Granadino; this has become one of the prominent monuments in the city of Santa Ana.

When Martin van der Waals of Erfgoed Tilburg wrote a jubilee book for Asterius with Piet Jacobs, he made contact with Kessels' descendants in November 2022. His Salvadoran family donated a 1913 medal, which was awarded to their great-grandfather, to the Kessels Museum, named after José Kessels' brother, in Tilburg. The museum received the medal on 24 August 2023. His family, however, had to clean out his archive of sheet music which had been damaged with time.

== Bibliography ==
- Robijns, Jozef; Zijlstra, Miep (1981). Algemene muziek encyclopedie (in Dutch). Vol. 5. Haarlem: De Haan. p. 172. ISBN 978-90-228-4930-9.
- Toeche-Mittler, Joachim (1977). 2. Teil - Sammlung und Dokumentation. Armeemärsche (in German). Vol. 2 (Expanded and revised 2nd ed.). Neckargemünd: Kurt Vowinckel Verlag. p. 88.
- Toeche-Mittler, Joachim (1977). 3. Teil - die Geschichte unserer Marschmusik. Armeemärsche (in German). Vol. 3 (Expanded and revised 2nd ed.). Neckargemünd: Kurt Vowinckel Verlag. pp. 174–175.
