= Mario Roberto Zuñiga =

Salvadoran musician

Mario Roberto Zúniga is a Salvadoran musician and the current director of the Orquesta Internacional Canela de El Salvador. In 1986 he was festival director of the OTI song festival in Santiago, Chile. Among his best known songs are "Morena Salvadoreña", "Ingrata", "La Cumbia", "De Los Mojados", "Amor Tirano", "El Baile De La Vela", and "Sola en la cama, violencia". During his career he has been with major international artists such as Leo Dan, Lucho Muñoz, Los Galos, Los Dandy's, and Alci Acosta. As of 2014 he is the director of the Orquesta Platinum.
