= Anastasio y los del Monte =

- Origin: El Salvador
- Genres: reggae
- Members: Karlanga; Rolando Montes; Federico Uriburu; Pitu; Boby Babylon; Churro; Chacha; Jose F. Aguilar; Juan Carlos Ascensio
- Website: Website (Spanish)

Anastasio y los del Monte was a short-lived yet influential reggae group in El Salvador. Despite only releasing a single album, they made a large cultural impact in the music of El Salvador by introducing reggae to the country. Their music is greatly influenced by Bob Marley, Gondwana, Steel Pulse, Burning Spear, and Black Uhuru. Their most famous song is "Dias Pasados".

== Members ==
- Karlanga (lead singer, rhythm guitar)
- Rolando Montes (lead guitar)
- Federico Uriburu (drums)
- Pitu (keyboard)
- Boby Babylon (bass, vocals)
- Churro (percussion)
- Chacha (Saxophone, vocals)
- Jose F. Aguilar (trumpet)
- Juan Carlos Ascensio (Saxophpone)

== Discography ==
- Reggae Unido (2005)
