= Los Torogoces de Morazán =

- Origin: El Salvador
- Genres: Folk
- Years active: 1981–present
- Members: Sebastián Torogoz

Los Torogoces de Morazán are a Salvadoran folk music group formed by members of the Farabundo Martí National Liberation Front (FMLN) in 1981 during the Salvadoran Civil War.

Their music was broadcast by Radio Venceremos which also formed in 1981, and was declared the official music of the revolution.

None of the members had formal music training. They were in part inspired by Carlos Mejía Godoy.

== Legacy ==
Founding member Sebastián Torogoz continues to make music, now in response to contemporary Salvadoran politics, particularly regarding Nayib Bukele.

In 2025, a biographical study, Sonic Rebellion in El Salvador, was published on the group by OtherForms.
