= Pescozada =

Hip hop group from El Salvador

- Origin: Chalatenango, El Salvador
- Genres: Salvadoran hip hop Hardcore
- Years active: 1998–present
- Label: Istmo Music
- Members: Debil Estar, Fat Lui, Omnionn
- Past members: Poeta DeMente
- Website: pescozada.com

Pescozada is a hip hop group formed in Chalatenango, El Salvador. Their name means "slap" or "punch" (usually in the face) in modern Spanish. They are also well known throughout El Salvador for addressing political situation, its problems, and its civil war.

== History ==
Pescozada was formed in 1998 by two rappers, Luis Escobar (Fat Lui) and Cesar Diaz Alvarenga (Debil Estar), who were longtime friends and both hip hop enthusiasts. They grew up in the darkest times of El Salvador, when the civil war was happening and their department, Chalatenango, was facing the most violence. Unlike many other rappers they do not rap about the usual drugs and sex but rap about social topics such as gangs (however they do not express any allegiance to any specific ones), politics, and the future of El Salvador. The addition of Salvadoran hip hop and electronica producer, Omnionn, has elevated music production to unprecedented levels in the Latin hip-hop scene. Their music (both lyrics and melodies) is much heavier and darker than common Latin hip-hop, and the lyrics are usually more fast-paced.

=== Diaz Ozkuros en el Barrio ===
In 2002, they released their first album, "Diaz Oskuros en el Barrio". In 2003, they released a compilation called "El Klan de la Diskordia-La Primera Reunion". This compilation featured themselves and other great rappers of Central America, particularly from El Salvador. They have worked with many artists such as Mecate, Apollo 11 and Frost from Sindicato Argentino Del Hip Hop, Mi'ky y El As (Spain), and most of their fellow Salvadoran rappers, like Robwest and Reyes del Bajo Mundo.

=== Dialectos Nativos ===
In 2004, Pescozada released "Dialectos Nativos" with Salvadoran-American rapper Joaquin Santos. It had a tremendous influence in first and second generation Salvadorans throughout North America. They also claim those immigrants once again started speaking "el dialecto" (Salvadoran Spanish) and this helped them retain their proud traditions as the Salvadoran people, despite the oppression and poverty they faced in the countries they immigrated from. This album also speaks heavily about the Salvadoran civil war, which can be heard on songs like "Cielo Gris".

Both "Diaz Oskuros en el Barrio" and "Dialectos Nativos" were released with the three original members of Pescozada: Fat Lui, Debil Estar, and another rapper by the name of Poeta Demente (Mario Arteaga). Arteaga has since left the group for unexplained reasons. "El Teatro Plebeyo" was released with Pescozada being a duo (Debíl Estar & Fat Lui) but under the musical, technical, and marketing supervision of US-based producer Omnionn. In 2007 Pescozada became officially a trio once again with the incorporation of Omnionn as a member, according to their official website.

=== El Teatro Plebeyo ===
In August 2005, Pescozada released their first label-backed release titled El Teatro Plebeyo. The CD contains 17 tracks true to the group's ideology and political points of view. The record also contains collaborations with well-respected acts in the international hip-hop scene such as Frost from Sindicato Argentino del Hip Hop (2001 Grammy Winners), San Francisco Bay Area's Sean T (Producer for Mac Dre, E-40, Spice 1, San Quinn, Guce, Planet Asia, and others), Santos, Apolo 11, Reyes del Bajo Mundo, Salaya, Mic'ky y El As (Spain), and Robwest.

The album served not only as an international showcase for group, but as a point of reference for Central American hip-hop to this day. Pescozada gained radio airplay in many markets outside of El Salvador where Salvadoran communities can be found, especially in the US and Canada.

=== Anarquia Club Social ===
On June 2, 2009, after four years of studio work, Anarquia Club Social was officially released. The album consists of thirteen songs and two hidden tracks 100% produced and co-produced by the members of Pescozada. Unlike El Teatro Plebeyo, collaborations with other producers and rappers were nonexistent, with the exception of long-time group friend Joaquin Santos who appears in three songs.

The Salvadoran press qualified the album as presenting a more secure, more seasoned Pescozada, product of a ten-year musical career. Debil Estar focuses on lyrical content rather than his trademark rapid phrase delivery. Fat Lui cemented his no-nonsense lyrical style with elegant lines that keep his verses varied. Omnionn returned to many of his electronica roots which can be observed throughout his productions, breaking away from the conventional styles found in Salvadoran hip hop.

Six months after the release of Anarquia Club Social, the music label Istmo Music chose the album and the group to launch its new division, Istmo Urban, and signed Pescozada into a co-marketing deal for promoting the album worldwide, mostly through internet digital distribution sites such as iTunes, Amazon.com, Walmart.com, Virgin, Rhapsody, MySpace Music, Napster, Zune (Microsoft) and AOL.

The album features two successful singles: "In tha place (feat. Salaya)" and "Anarquia". The last mentioned song has raised controversy amongst media outlets in El Salvador, mainly for the use of Salvadoran President Antonio Saca's voice as part of the lyrical content. The song has raised questions regarding freedom of expression in El Salvador, which traditionally has been easily silenced in the small Central American nation. "Anarquia" found a handful of left-wing radio stations willing to air it since most mainstream radio stations have allegedly censored the song.

== Other claims to fame ==
Debil Estar has made a solo EP called "Debildades", released on August 6, 2006, featuring 11 tracks that can be downloaded for free from the group's website. He also has a radio hip-hop show in Salvadoran radio station YXY 105.7 FM every Tuesday 7-9 PM (Central American Standard Time|-6 GTM), which can also be heard through the internet on the radio station's website.

== Discography ==
- "Anarquia Club Social" (2009)
- Organico (2006)
- El Teatro Plebeyo (2005)
- Dialectos Nativos (2004)
- Diaz Oskuros en el Barrio (2002)
