= David Granadino =

Salvadoran composer (1876–1933)

David Granadino (June 13, 1876 – August 22, 1933) was a Salvadoran composer and musician, one of the most celebrated of the country.

Granadino was born on June 13, 1876, in Barrio de Santa Barbara in the Salvadoran city of Santa Ana, the son of Joaquin Chavez, a pianist, and Simona Granadino. He studied music with teachers Daniel Alas and Pío Paredes Gonzáles. In 1897 he learned to play violin with the Dutch master José Kessels, performing with the Sociedad Lírica Santaneca and the Banda Marcial de Santa Ana.

Granadina became noted for his waltzes. The first he composed was "El Pirulí" as part of the examination he took to study at the music academy. Then followed "Reminiscencias", "Ismenia", "Bella Natividad", "Dora", "Toñita" and, his most widely known piece, "Bajo el Almendro" (Under the Almond Tree, often also played on the guitar). He also composed several tangos, including "Por una mirada", "Gloria", "Honor cuscatleco", "Bella como las flores", "Los pimpollos", "Club Atlas", and "Club Salvadoreño".

In commemoration of the eightieth anniversary of Granadino's death, a special concert was presented in Santa Ana on 22 August 2013 under the auspices of the city's cultural department. The group Yulu Nahuat performed a new version of "Bajo el Almendro", singing the specially written lyrics.
