= Germán Cáceres =

Salvadoran composer (born 1954)

- Born: Germán Cáceres; July 9, 1954 (age 71); San Salvador, El Salvador
- Occupation: Composer
- Known for: Guggenheim Fellowship, Ordre des Arts et des Lettres
- Notable work: Contemporary classical music

Germán Cáceres (born July 9, 1954 in San Salvador) is a Salvadoran composer of contemporary classical music and a musical conductor. His output is mainly orchestral and chamber music. He was a Guggenheim Fellow in 1981, and was named a Chevalier of the Ordre des Arts et des Lettres in 1992, among many other honors. Cáceres is an alumnus of the Juilliard School, where he studied with David Diamond and Stanley Wolfe; during his time in New York he also studied composition and conducting privately, with Julián Orbón and José Serebrier respectively. He earned his DMA at the Cincinnati College-Conservatory of Music. He worked extensively with fellow Salvadoran composer Alex Panamá to perform Panamá's works in El Salvador. In 1996, he started the Festival of Contemporary Music in San Salvador. The festival featured composer Jonathan Kramer and pianist Bruce Brubaker.
