= José Escolástico Andrino =

Salvadoran composer and politician (1817–1862)

José Escolástico Andrino (1817, in Guatemala City – July 14, 1862 in San Salvador) was a Salvadoran composer, considered to be the founder of the classical music scene in his country. In 1845, he established a Conservatory in San Salvador, where he both composed and taught. He wrote two symphonies, three masses, a set of variations for violin and orchestra, and one opera La Mora generosa (the Generous Blackberry).
