= Juan Aberle =

Italian-born conductor and composer (1846–1930)

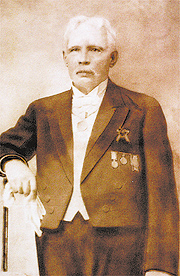
Juan Aberle (date unknown)

Giovanni Enrico Aberle Sforza, better known as Juan Aberle, (11 December 1846 – 28 February 1930) was an Italian conductor and composer who lived in Guatemala and El Salvador.

== Biography ==
Born in Naples, at eleven years of age, his obvious affinity for music led him to be enrolled in the Neapolitan Conservatory against the wishes of his parents, Heinrich Aberle and Angela Sforza. After completing his studies he went to New York City, where he was an opera director for five years.

Later, he undertook a musical tour of Latin America. Upon arriving in Guatemala City, he paused to establish a philharmonic society and music conservatory, which he directed from 1873 to 1879.

He then went to El Salvador and established a music school. While there, he composed the music for the Himno Nacional de El Salvador. Later, the Salvadoran government named him director of "La Banda de los Altos Poderes". Because of his advanced age, he retired from public life in 1922. He died in El Salvador in 1930.

His preferred instrument was the piano. He composed a large quantity of chamber music and made transcriptions of opera arias for the piano. His march in honor of Francisco Morazán was declared the "National March" in 1882. He wrote two operas, of which "Ivanhoe" (based on the novel by Sir Walter Scott), is the best known. He also wrote a textbook, "Tratado de Armonía, Contrapunto y Fuga".

He died in San Salvador.

=== The Salvadoran national anthem ===
Aberle and General Juan José Cañas (who wrote the lyrics) originally received no compensation for their work. Twenty-three years later, on 4 April 1902, the President, Tomás Regalado, and the Legislative Assembly of El Salvador awarded a gold medal to each of them, along with an expression of national gratitude.
