= F. W. Meacham =

American composer and arranger

Frank White Meacham (May 31, 1856 – December 22, 1909) was an American composer and arranger of Tin Pan Alley.

Meacham was born in Brooklyn, New York. His most famous work is American Patrol (1885), a popular march. Written originally for piano, it was then arranged for wind band and published by Carl Fischer in 1891. It was later arranged for Glenn Miller's swing band by Jerry Gray, and was also arranged by composer Morton Gould.

Meacham lived in New York City for much of his life. Many of his works were military marches, tribute pieces, and early ragtime works. He died in New York City of pneumonia and is buried in the Albany Rural Cemetery in Menands, New York.

== Selected works ==
- Meacham, F. W. American Patrol (1885)
- Meacham, F. W. Dance of the fairies: polka rondo. New York: Willis, Woodward & Co, 1886. OCLC 26320987
- Meacham, F. W. Grand fantasia on the famous theme of the mocking bird. New York: De Luxe Music Co, 1905. OCLC 613714363
- Meacham, F. W. Marching Through Georgia. New York: De Luxe Music Co, 1908. OCLC 43301402
- Meacham, F. W., and Stephen Collins Foster. Old black Joe: Foster's original theme with variations. New York: Century Music Pub, 1904. OCLC 21326000
- Meacham, F. W., and Stephen Collins Foster. Old folks at home: way down upon the Suanee River. New York (Broadway and 37th St., New York): Conservatory Publication Society, 1904. OCLC 22162245
- Meacham, F. W. Shooting the Chutes: Medley Lancers for Piano. New York: Howley, Haviland & Dresser, 1903. OCLC 497043216
- Burke, Joe, Edgar Leslie, and F. W. Meacham. We Must Be Vigilant. New York: Bregman, Vocco and Conn, Inc, 1942. OCLC 99629524
- Meacham, F. W. Yankee patrol: (two-step). New York: Brooks & Denton, 1904. OCLC 794980415
