= National Anthem of El Salvador =

Himno Nacional de El Salvador
English: National Anthem of El Salvador
- National anthem of El Salvador
- Also known as: "Saludemos la patria orgullosos de hijos suyos podernos llamar" (English: Let us salute the fatherland, proud of being able to be called its children)
- Lyrics: Juan José Cañas, 1856
- Music: Juan Aberle, 1879
- Adopted: 15 September 1879; 146 years ago (de facto); 11 December 1953; 72 years ago (de jure)

Audio sample
- U.S. Navy Band instrumental version: file; help

U.S. Navy Band instrumental version (abridged)
Abridged sub-90-second version of the U.S. Navy Band's rendition featuring only the chorus for occasions requiring brevity, such as soccer games

MIDI instrumental version

The National Anthem of El Salvador (Spanish: Himno Nacional de El Salvador) was adopted on 15 September 1879 and officially approved on 11 December 1953. The lyrics were written by General Juan José Cañas in 1856, with music composed by the Italian Juan Aberle in 1879.

The composition has been likened to "William Tell Overture" by critics.

== History ==
=== 1866 anthem ===
Abridged version played before a football game at RFK Stadium, Washington, D.C., in 2011

In 1866, at the initiative of doctor Francisco Dueñas, who at the time was President of the Republic, the first national anthem of El Salvador was created by Cuban doctor Tomás M. Muñoz, who wrote the lyrics, and Salvadoran musician Rafael Orozco, who composed the music. This national anthem was legally adopted through Executive Agreement of 8 October 1866, being published in the state newspaper El Constitucional No. 31, Volume 2, of 11 October 1866, to be officially released on 24 January 1867.

Spanish original

Coro:
Libertad, Libertad es el grito
Que á la Patria feliz encamina;
Libertad es la estrella divina
Luz de gloria del fiel Salvador.

I
En la Patria dichosa resuena
De los libres un canto bendito:
Ella nunca al estigma maldito
Se rindió de la vil opresion.

Contemplando gozosa en el Cielo
Levantada su espléndida estrella,
De la Union en la pléyade bella
A los mundos dará admiracion.

Coro

II
Resolvióse su dicha labrar
Porque esclava vivir no consiente;
Libertad es su timbre fulgente
Libertad su bandera y honor.

Y sus hijos, sus bravos soldados;
Para gloria mayor de sus leyes
El poder condenó de los reyes......
¡Que es la Ley su absoluto señor!

Coro

III
Solo encierra tu seno demócratas
Dulce Patria, con solo un matiz;
Tú por libre respiras feliz
La Igualdad en tu suelo creció.

Generoso te extiende su mano
Y te llama República fuerte,
Todo un Dios que te brinda la suerte
Cuantos bienes la tierra creó.

Coro

IV
Si los pueblos de América un dia
Bajo el yugo de Iberia gimieron,
Héroes tuvo que al fin sacudieron
De su frente tan torpe baldon.

Su memoria honoremos rendidos
Aclamemos sus glorias y hazañas,
Y resuene en las altas montañas
El placer de esta libre Nacion.

Coro

English translation

Chorus:
Liberty, Liberty is the cry
That leads to a happy country;
Liberty is the divine star
Light of glory of the faithful Savior.

I
In the blissful homeland resounds
A blessed song of the free:
She never, to the cursed stigma
Of vile oppression, surrendered.

Joyfully beholding, in Heaven
Her splendid star raised,
From the Union in the beautiful Pleiad
She will give admiration to the worlds.

Chorus

II
She resolved her happiness to work
Because she does not consent to live a slave;
Liberty is her shining stamp
Liberty her flag and honour.

And her children, her brave soldiers;
For the greater glory of her laws
She doomed the power of the kings......
Because the Law is her absolute lord!

Chorus

III
Just enclose your bosom, democrats
Sweet Fatherland, with just one nuance;
You freely breathe happily
Equality grew on your soil.

The generous extends his hand to you
And calls you a strong Republic,
A true God who provides you fortune
All the goods the earth created.

Chorus

IV
If the peoples of America one day
Moaned under the yoke of Iberia,
Heroes had to finally shake off
From their forehead such a clumsy disgrace.

Let us honour their memory surrendered
Let us acclaim their glories and deeds,
And let resonate in the high mountains
The pleasure of this free Nation.

Chorus

This anthem was sung until the overthrow of President Dueñas through a coup d'état in 1871.

=== 1879 anthem ===
Later, in 1879, at the initiative of then president Rafael Zaldívar, the current National Anthem of El Salvador would be created by Cañas and Aberle as authors of its lyrics and music, respectively.

Through the Executive Agreement of 3 June 1891, published in the Official Gazette No. 128, Volume 30, of 3 June 1891, and General Carlos Ezeta being then president, it was legally adopted, at the initiative of Ezeta, as a new national anthem known under the official name of "El Salvador Libre", which was dedicated to the Salvadoran Armed Forces. The composition of the lyrics and music of this national anthem, which was previously officially released on 2 May 1891, was the responsibility of Italian artist Césare Georgi Vélez.

General Ezeta was overthrown in a coup d'état executed in 1894, and after his fall, the national anthem made by Cañas and Aberle was sung again in 1879, although it lacked official recognition. This situation was resolved by Legislative Decree No. 1231, of 13 November 1953, published in the Official Gazette No. 226, Volume 161, of 11 December 1953, through which the Legislative Assembly, at the request of the Salvadoran Academy of History, officially recognised as the national anthem of El Salvador the anthem written and composed by Cañas and Aberle, respectively, and solemnly premiered on 15 September 1879 in the esplanade of the old National Palace of El Salvador, whose civic ceremony was attended by members of the presidential cabinet of that time.

Immediately, and in the spacious patio of the Palace, sung by all the youth of the Colleges and schools of this Capital was the beautiful patriotic anthem composed by Mr. Juan J. Cañas and Mr. Juan Aberle, both artists of notable merit, the first of the lyrics of the anthem, and the second of the music. Said hymn composed for 15 September was premiered with the accompaniment of the military band and deserved general approval.

— Published in the Official Gazette of 17 September 1879, Volume 7, Issue 218, Page 1295.

== Regulation ==
All radio and television stations must air the national anthem in accordance to the law and should be played during "Startup" and "Closedown" of every stations.

== Lyrics ==
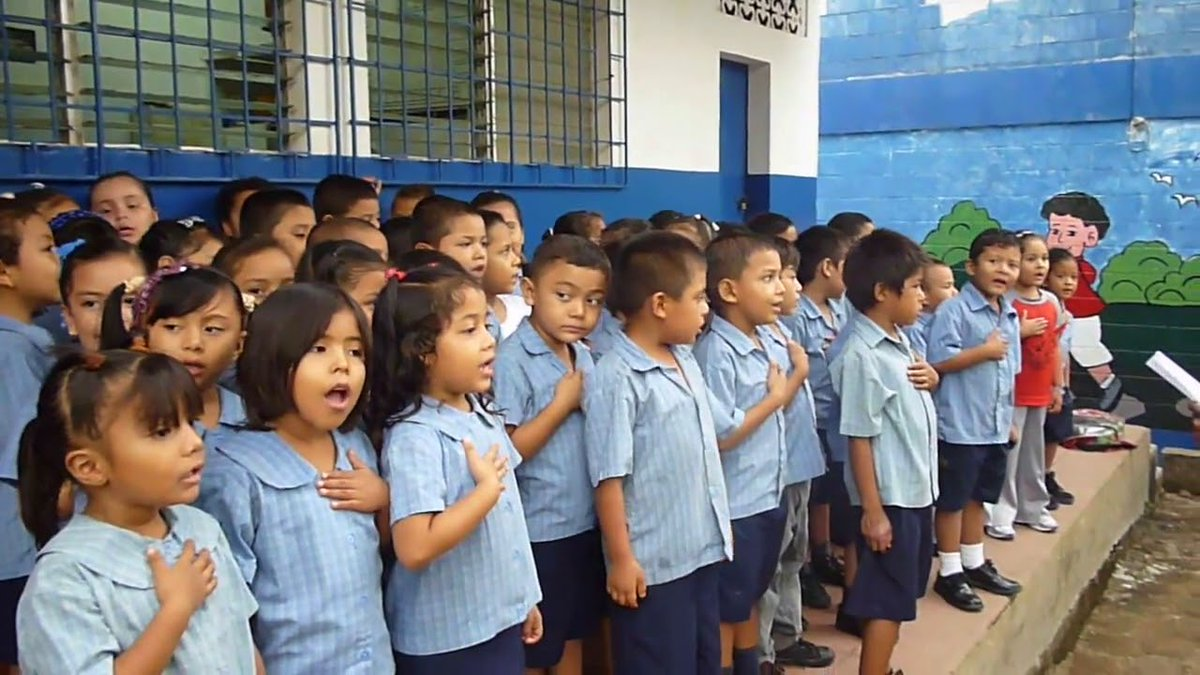
Public school of El Salvador. In 1992, Legislative Decree 342 established that the public execution of the National Anthem of El Salvador must begin with the chorus and end with the first verse.

The National Anthem of El Salvador is made up of a chorus and three stanzas, although the last two have not been sung for many years, as a full performance can take more than four minutes to complete. However, this custom would only obtain official recognition through Legislative Decree No. 342, of 7 October 1992, published in the Official Gazette No. 223, Volume 317, of 3 December 1992, through the which the Legislative Assembly decided to reform Article 15 of the National Symbols Law, where it was established that the execution of the national anthem must begin with the chorus and end with the first verse. However, it has become very common to only sing the chorus, which is repeated, since it is the strongest musical part of the national anthem.

=== Spanish original ===
Spanish original

Coro:
𝄆 Saludemos la patria orgullosos
de hijos suyos podernos llamar
y juremos la vida animosos,
sin descanso a su bien consagrar. 𝄇
𝄆 Consagrar, consagrar. 𝄇

I
De la paz en la dicha suprema,
Siempre noble soñó El Salvador;
Fue obtenerla su eterno problema,
Conservarla es su gloria mayor.

Y con fe inquebrantable el camino
Del progreso se afana en seguir (en seguir),
Por llenar su grandioso destino,
Conquistarse un feliz porvenir.

Le protege una férrea barrera
Contra el choque de ruin deslealtad,
Desde el día que en su alta bandera
Con su sangre escribió: ¡LIBERTAD!
𝄆 Escribió: ¡LIBERTAD! 𝄇

Coro

II
Libertad es su dogma, es su guía
Que mil veces logró defender;
Y otras tantas, de audaz tiranía
Rechazar el odioso poder.

Dolorosa y sangrienta es su historia,
Pero excelsa y brillante a la vez (a la vez);
Manantial de legítima gloria,
Gran lección de espartana altivez.

No desmaya en su innata bravura,
En cada hombre hay un héroe inmortal
Que sabrá mantenerse a la altura
De su antiguo valor proverbial.
𝄆 Valor proverbial. 𝄇

Coro

III
Todos son abnegados, y fieles
Al prestigio del bélico ardor
Con que siempre segaron laureles
De la patria salvando el honor.

Respetar los derechos extraños
Y apoyarse en la recta razón (razón)
Es para ella, sin torpes amaños
Su invariable, más firme ambición.

Y en seguir esta línea se aferra
Dedicando su esfuerzo tenaz,
En hacer cruda guerra a la guerra:
Su ventura se encuentra en la paz.
𝄆 Se encuentra en la paz. 𝄇

Coro

IPA transcription (Note: See Help:IPA/Spanish and Salvadoran Spanish.)

[ˈko.ɾo]
𝄆 [sa.lu.ˈðe.mos la ˈpa.tɾja‿oɾ.gu.ˈʝo.sos]
[de‿ˈi.xos ˈsu.ʝos po.ˈðeɾ.noz‿ɟ͡ʝa.ˈmaɾ]
[i xu.ˈɾe.mos la‿ˈβi.ð(a)‿a.ni.ˈmo.sos]
[sin des.ˈkan.so‿a su‿βjen kon.sa.ˈɣɾaɾ] 𝄇
𝄆 [kon.sa.ˈɣɾaɾ kon.sa.ˈɣɾaɾ] 𝄇

1
[de la pas en la‿ˈði.t͡ʃa su.ˈpɾe.ma]
[ˈsjem.pɾe ˈno.βle so.ˈɲo‿el sal.βa.ˈðoɾ]
[fwe oβ.te.ˈneɾ.la su e.ˈteɾ.no pɾo.ˈβle.ma]
[kon.seɾ.ˈβaɾ.la‿es su‿ˈɣlo.ɾja ma.ˈʝoɾ]

[i kon fe‿iŋ.ke.βɾan.ˈta.βle‿el ka.ˈmi.no]
[del pɾo.ˈɣɾe.so se‿a.fa.ˈna‿en se.ˈɣiɾ]
[poɾ ɟ͡ʝe.ˈnaɾ su‿ɣɾan.ˈdjo.so‿ðes.ˈti.no]
[koŋ.kis.ˈtaɾ.se‿un fe.ˈlis poɾ.ve.ˈniɾ]

[le pɾo.ˈte.xe‿ˈu.na ˈfe.re.a‿βa.ˈre.ɾa]
[ˈkon.tɾa‿el ˈt͡ʃo.ke‿ðe ˈrwin dez.le.al.ˈtað]
[ˈdez.ðe‿el ˈdi.a ke‿en su‿ˈal.ta‿βan.ˈde.ɾa]
[kon su ˈsaŋ.gɾe‿es.kɾi.ˈβjo ǀ li.βeɾ.ˈtað ǁ]
𝄆 [es.kɾi.ˈβjo ǀ li.βeɾ.ˈtað ǁ] 𝄇

[ˈko.ɾo]

2
[li.βeɾ.ˈtað es su‿ˈðoɣ.ma‿es su ˈɣi.a]
[ke mil‿ˈβe.ses lo.ˈɣɾo‿ðe.fen.ˈdeɾ]
[i‿ˈo.tɾas ˈtan.tas ǀ de‿au̯.ˈðas ti.ɾa.ˈni.a]
[re.t͡ʃa.saɾ el o.ˈðjo.so po.ˈðeɾ]

[do.lo.ˈɾo.sa‿i saŋ.ˈgɾjen.ta‿es su‿ˈis.to.ɾja]
[ˈpe.ɾo‿eɣ.ˈsel.sa‿i‿βɾi.ˈʝan.te‿a la‿βes]
[ma.nan.ˈtjal de le.ˈxi.ti.maˈˈɣlo.ɾja]
[gɾan lek.ˈsjon de‿es.paɾ.ˈta.na‿al.ti.βes]

[noˈðez.ˈma.ʝa‿en su‿in.ˈna.taˈβɾa.ˈvu.ɾa]
[en ˈka.ða‿ˈom.bɾe‿ai̯‿un ˈe.ɾo.e‿im.moɾ.ˈtal]
[ke sa.ˈβɾa man.te.ˈneɾ.se‿a la‿ˈal.tu.ɾa]
[de suˈan.ˈti.ɣwoˈβa.ˈloɾ pɾo.βeɾ.ˈβjal]
[ba.ˈloɾ pɾo.βeɾ.ˈβjal]

[ˈko.ɾo]

3
[ˈto.ðos son aβ.na.ˈɣa.ðos i ˈfje.les]
[al pɾes.ˈti.xjo‿ðel‿ˈβe.li.ko‿aɾ.ˈðoɾ]
[kon ke ˈsjem.pɾe se.ɣa.ˈɾon lau̯.ˈɾe.les]
[de la ˈpa.tɾja sal.ˈβan.do‿el o.ˈnoɾ]

[res.pe.ˈtaɾ loz‿ðe.ˈɾe.t͡ʃos eɣs.ˈtɾa.ɲos]
[i‿a.po.ˈʝaɾ.se‿en la ˈɾek.ta ɾa.ˈson]
[es ˈpa.ɾa‿ˈe.ʝa sin ˈtoɾ.pes a.ˈma.ɲos]
[su‿im.ba.ˈɾja.βle mas ˈfiɾ.me‿am.bi.ˈsjon]

[i‿en se.ˈɣiɾ ˈes.ta ˈli.ne.a se‿a.ˈfe.ra]
[de.ði.ˈkan.do su‿es.ˈfweɾ.so te.ˈnas]
[en a.ˈseɾ ˈkɾu.ða‿ˈɣe.ra‿a la‿ˈɣe.ra]
[su‿βen.ˈtu.ɾa se‿eŋ.ˈkwen.tɾa‿en la pas]
[se‿eŋ.ˈkwen.tɾa‿en la pas]

[ˈko.ɾo]

English translation

Chorus:
𝄆 Let us salute the fatherland, proud
Of being able to be called its children
And let us swear our life, spirited,
To consecrate its good without rest. 𝄇
𝄆 Consecrate, consecrate. 𝄇

I
Of peace in supreme bliss,
Always noble El Salvador dreamt;
Obtaining it was her eternal challenge,
Keeping it is her greatest glory.

And with unwavering faith, the path
Of progress, she strives to follow (to follow),
To fulfil her grand destiny,
Conquer a happy future.

An iron barrier protects her
Against the clash of vile disloyalty,
Since the day that on her high flag
With her blood she wrote "LIBERTY!"
𝄆 She wrote "LIBERTY!" 𝄇

Chorus

II
Liberty is her dogma, is her guide
That she managed to defend a thousand times;
And as many times, audacious tyranny's
Hateful power, to repel.

Painful and bloody is her story,
But lofty and brilliant at the same time (at the same time);
A source of legitimate glory,
A great lesson of Spartan pride.

Her innate bravery does not waver,
In each man there is an immortal hero
Who will know how to keep to the merit
Of its ancient proverbial value.
𝄆 Proverbial value. 𝄇

Chorus

III
All are selfless, and faithful
To the prestige of warlike ardour
With which they always reaped glories
Saving the honour of the fatherland.

To respect the rights of others
And base herself on just reason (reason)
Is for her, without dishonest tricks,
Her invariable, firmest ambition.

And in following this line she persists
Dedicating her tenacious effort,
In waging harsh war on war:
Her fortune is found in peace.
𝄆 Is found in peace. 𝄇

Chorus

=== In Nawat ===
On 1 September 2009, during the inauguration of Civic Month in Suchitoto, Cuscatlán, the National Anthem was performed in Nawat by the Doctor Mario Calvo Marroquín School Centre Choir from Izalco, Sonsonate. The name of the national anthem in Nawat is Takwikalis Tutal ([ta.kʷi.ka.lis tu.tal]), meaning "Song to Our Land".

Nawat original

Coro:
𝄆 Tajpalulikan ka tupal ne tal (Note: Sometimes written ne tal ka tupal.)
Ipijpilawan tiwelit tukaytiyat
Wan kitalikan ne tiyultiwit (Note: Sometimes written Timutalikan pal tiyultiwit ([wan ki.ta.li.kan ne ti.jul.ti.wit]).)
Te musewiyat pal welit tikpiyate. 𝄇 (Note: Sometimes written Te timusewiat pal tiwelit tikpiat ([te mu.se.wi.(j)at pal we.lit tik.pi(.)at]).)
𝄆 Tikpiyate, tikpiyate. 𝄇 (Note: Sometimes written Welit tikpiat ([we.lit tik.pi(.)at]).)

I
Timunekit pal tiwelit tinemit
Sejsenpatimikwit ne takushkatan palkwi (Note: Sometimes written Sempa nejmach nemi né Kuskatan ([sem.pa neh.mat͡ʃ ne.mi nekus.ka.tan]).)
Ka kipiak ka te akaj kinekik (Note: Sometimes written Ka kipiak akaj tesu ka kinekik ([ka ki.pi.ak a.kah te.su ka ki.ne.kik]).)
Ka kichiwki achta nemit achtu nemi. (Note: Sometimes written Ka kipiak ka achtu kineki ([ka ki.pi.ak ka at͡ʃ.tu ki.ne.ki]).)

Wan tay inak te mukwepki tik ne ujti (Note: Sometimes written Yultaketzki te mukwepki tik ne ujti ([yul.ta.ket͡s.ki te mu.kʷep.ki tik ne uh.tiʔ]).)
Pal kipiate keman musewij (musewij)
Pal kitema se tumak tiawit kipiat (Note: Sometimes, this line is omitted.)
Kiputzawase ipal ya nemi (Note: Sometimes written Kitemua te Ken tiawit né ([ki.te.mu.a te ken tja.wit ne]).)

Kipalewki se ketzal tet.
Kitat munami kaj te muneki (Note: Sometimes written Wan munamik Kaj tesu Kaj kineki ([wan mu.na.mik kah te.su kah ki.ne.ki]).)
Keman ne tunal ku tik ne ajku panti (Note: Sometimes written Ashta ne Tunal tik ne ajku panti ([aʃ.ta ne tu.nal tik ne ah.ku pan.ti]).)
Wan yesyu tawawasuj tamakichti,
𝄆 Tawawasuj tamakichti, 𝄇 (Note: If the line Pal kitema se tumak tiawit kipiat is omitted, this is followed by the line Tawawasuj tamakichti, tawawasuj.)

IPA transcription (Note: See es:Idioma náhuat § Fonología and Nawat § Phonology.)

[[ko.ro]
𝄆 [tah.pa.lu.li.kaŋ ka tu.pal ne tal]
[i.pih.pi.la.wan ti.we.lit tu.kaj.ti.jat]
[waŋ ki.ta.li.kan ne ti.jul.ti.wit]
[te mu.se.wi.jat pal we.lit tik.pi.ja(.)t(eʔ)] 𝄇
𝄆 [tik.pi.ja(.)t(eʔ) tik.pi.ja(.)t(eʔ)] 𝄇

1
[ti.mu.ne.kit pal ti.we.lit ti.ne.mit]
[seh.sen.pa.ti.mi.kʷit ne ta.kuʃ.ka.tan pal.kʷiʔ]
[ka ki.pi(.)ak ka te a.kah ki.ne.kik]
[ka ki.t͡ʃiw.ki at͡ʃ.ta ne.mit t͡ʃ.tu ne.miʔ]

[wan taj i.nak te mu.kʷep.ki tik ne uh.tiʔ]
[pal ki.pja.te ke.man mu.se.wi mu.se.wih]
[pal ki.te.ma se tu.mak tʲwit ki.pjat]
[ki.pu.t͡sa.wa.se i.pal ya ne.miʔ]

[ki.pa.lew.ki se ke.t͡sal tet]
[ki.tat mu.na.mi kaj te mu.ne.kiʔ]
[ke.man ne tu.nal ku tik ne ah.ku pan.tiʔ]
[wan jes.ju ta.wa.wa.suh ta.ma(.)k(i)t͡ʃ.t(i)ʔ]
𝄆 [ta.wa.wa.suh ta.ma(.)k(i)t͡ʃ.t(i)ʔ] 𝄇]
