= Pancho Lara =

Salvadoran musician and composer

Francisco Antonio Lara Hernández (December 3, 1900, in Santa Ana – May 5, 1989, in San Salvador) was a Salvadoran musician and composer, who was one of the most important songwriters of El Salvador.

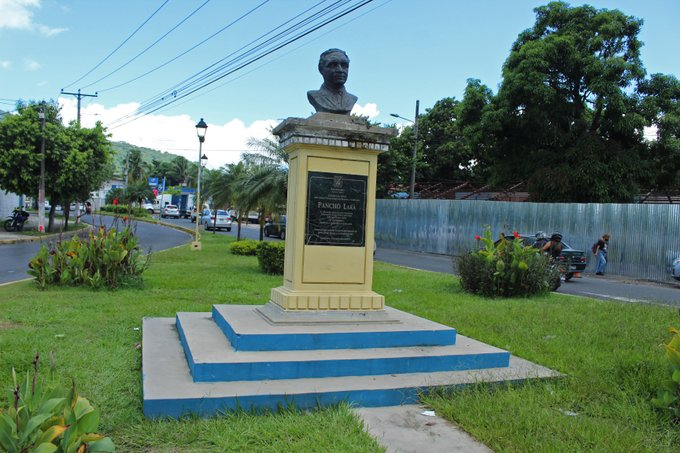
Bust of Francisco “pancho” Lara

He served for over 25 years as Supervisor of Music education in all of the Salvadoran territory. Cited as his country's best known musician, he was noted for his folk song El carbonero, which remains part of the El Salvador's national identity. Today, the anthropological museum of San Salvador has a music section dedicated to him.
