= Benjamín Solís Menéndez =

Salvadoran composer, pianist and conductor

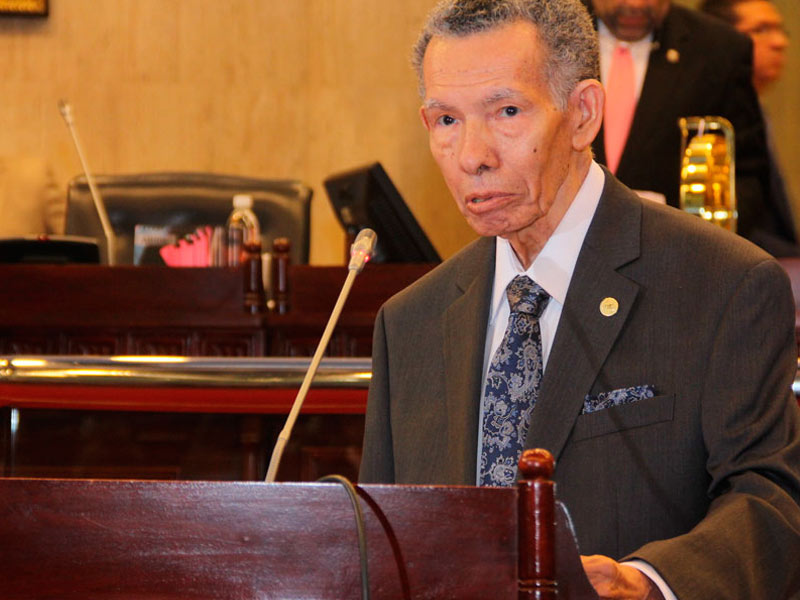
- Born: May 4, 1932; Chalchuapa, El Salvador
- Died: July 26, 2019 (aged 87)
- Occupations: Composer, pianist, organist

Benjamín Solís Menéndez (4 May 1932, in Chalchuapa – 26 July 2019) was a Salvadoran composer, pianist, organist and choir director. As choirmaster, he participated in the opening and closing of the V Central American Games in 1994 with the choir "Nueva Vida", and also formed part of the Vienna Opera, presenting the operetta "Die Fledermaus" by Johann Strauss and the "Merry Widow" by Franz Lehar, in the same year. He has directed many choirs, including the Coro Nacional de El Salvador, Coro de la Primera Iglesia Bautista de El Salvador, Coro del I.S.S.S., Coro Juvenil and the Coro Infantil del Liceo Cristiano "Reverendo Juan Bueno", and the Opera de El Salvador.

As a composer, his best known works are "Mis Caites", "Guanaquita Ausente", "Casamiento Pueblerino", "Acuarela Campesina" and "Los Inditos". He has also composed the hymns "Himno al trabajador Pueblo Salvadoreño", Himno del Liceo Cristiano "Revdo. Juan Bueno" (with lyrics by his wife), Himno de la Escuela Ciudad Normal "Alberto Masferrer" and others.

In 2004 he was recognized by the FLADEM (Foro Latinoamericano de Educación Musical), and awarded a Distinguished Honorary membership, the first Salvadoran to receive this recognition for his contributions to Latin American identity.
