= Ashutosh Deb =

Indian lexicographer and musician

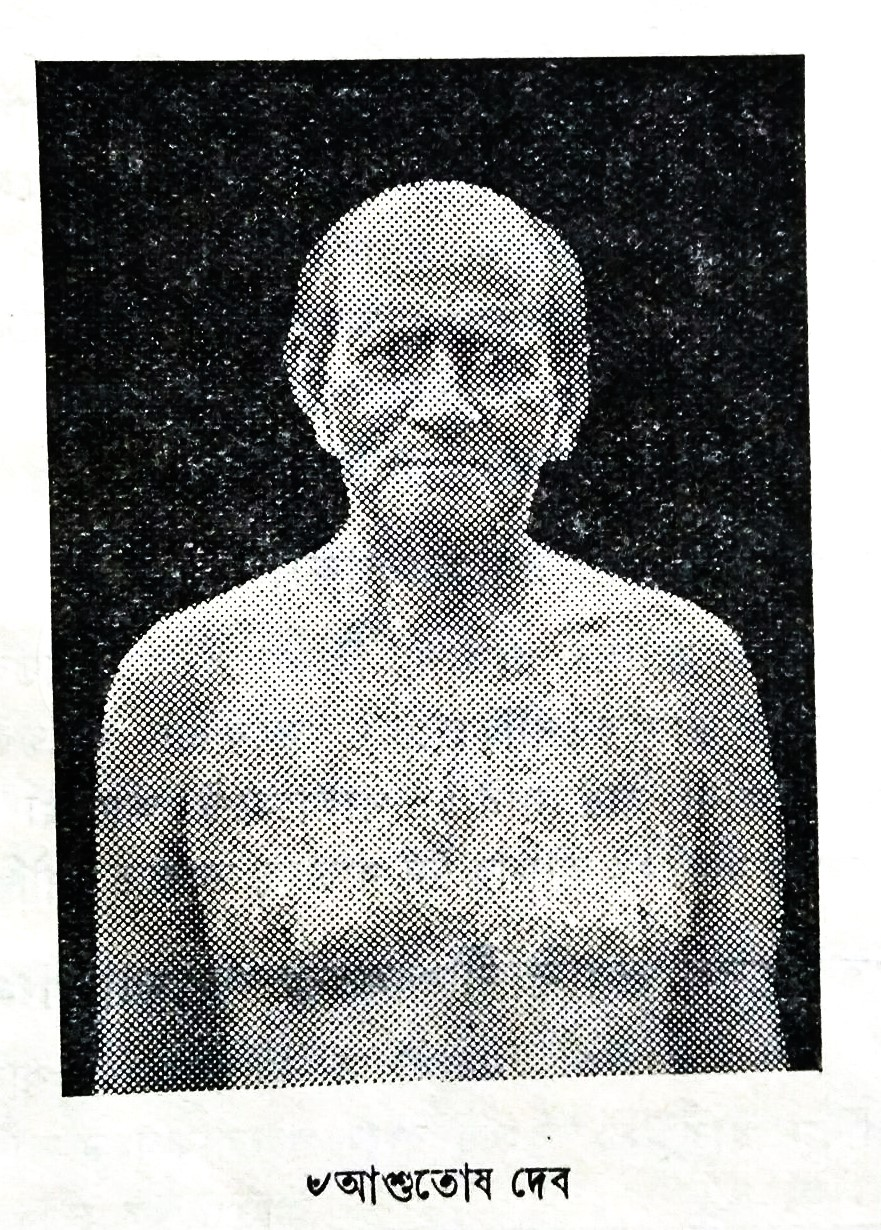
- Ashutosh Deb
- Occupations: lexicographer, publisher

Ashutosh Deb (1867-1943) commonly known as A. T. Deb was an Indian lexicographer, publisher and musician. He was the producer of an early Bengali dictionary. He started his career as a publisher and uplifted his father's publishing company BMR. Deb founded Deb Sahitya Kutir publishing house in Kolkata, a famous publications for children literature.
