= Alex Panamá =

Salvadoran composer (1940–2010)

- Born: Alex Antonio Panamá; May 8, 1940; Santa Ana, El Salvador
- Died: September 13, 2010 (aged 70); San Salvador, El Salvador
- Occupation: Composer
- Years active: 1958-2010
- Notable work: Contemporary classical music

Alex Panamá (8 May 1940 – 13 September 2010) was a Salvadoran composer of contemporary classical music. He mainly composed orchestral music. Born in Santa Ana, El Salvador, Panamá's mother raised him after his father died a few months after his birth. Panamá always had an inclination to music. Panamá studied music at the Juilliard School and in Europe under Nadia Boulanger and Pierre Boulez. Panamá also had a short-lived conducting career, directing concerts in El Salvador in the late 1950s and early 1960s. Panamá's main music performance collaborators were Salvadoran composer and conductor German Cáceres, Mexican composer and conductor Manuel de Elías, and Salvadoran guitarist Walter Quevedo. Panamá's main classical music works included Guitar Concerto Destellos de una Vida and a Symphonic Poem, both of which premiered in the late 2000s. Panamá also wrote a novel called Pocos minutos antes de las nueve de la noche. Panamá died on September 13, 2010.
