= Ricardo Cabrera Martínez =

Salvadoran tenor, poet and diplomat

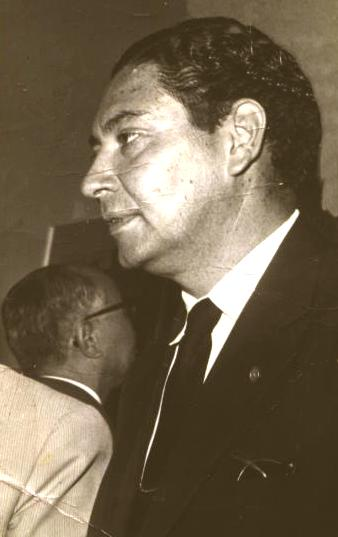
Ricardo Cabrera Martínez

Ricardo Cabrera Martínez (October 28, 1912 in Santa Tecla, La Libertad - 2007 in San Salvador) was a Salvadoran tenor, poet and diplomat. He is best remembered as a composer and tenor within the romance genre of Cuban and Mexican boleros. He sang on the song "A Mi Bolivia", composed by the musician Apolinar Camacho in 1944 in La Paz, Bolivia. He is also the creator of the poem Vereda Tropical, which was adapted into song by Gonzalo Curiel. A Doctor of Economics and Law, during the presidency of Colonel Arturo Armando Molina in 1975, he was appointed a Counsellor.
