= Juan José Cañas (writer) =

Salvadoran diplomat, writer of the national anthem (1826–1918)

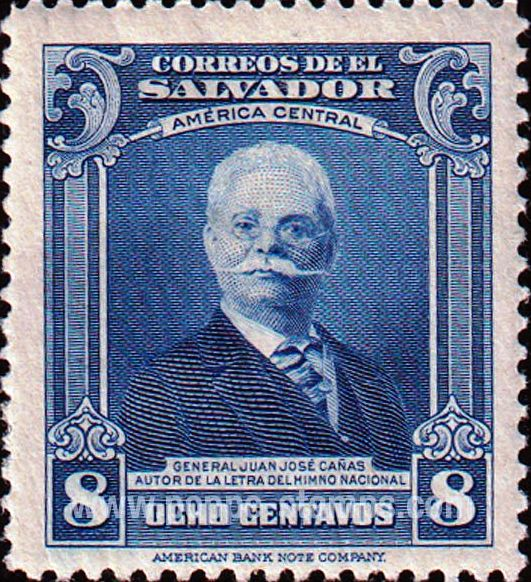

Juan José Cañas Pérez (9 June 1826 – 19 January 1918) is known for possibly having written the Himno Nacional De El Salvador (national hymn of El Salvador) along with Italian-born composer Juan Aberle.

Cañas studied medicine at universities in Nicaragua and Guatemala before moving to El Salvador briefly. In 1848, he moved to San Francisco to make use of his medical degree.

Later in life, Cañas served as El Salvador's diplomatic ambassador to Chile. His poetry can be found at the Central American Poetic Gallery in the Salvadoran Garland.

== Bibliography ==
- Zepeda Peña, Ciro Cruz (2006). "Historia del Órgano Legislativo de la República de El Salvador" [History of the Legislative Organ of the Republic of El Salvador] (PDF) (in Spanish). Legislative Assembly of El Salvador. Archived from the original (PDF) on 31 August 2021.
