= Reyes del Bajo Mundo =

Reyes del Bajo Mundo ("Kings of the Under World", commonly abbreviated RDBM) is a Salvadoran hip hop group. The group was formed in 1992 and is conformed by Cruz Control and Douglas Dinamico. A third member named Rey de Reyes left the group due to immigration problems. They are considered to be the original hip hop pioneers of El Salvador and the first group to bring Salvadoran hip hop to mainstream radio, television, and newspapers, with their release of Estilo Impereal in 1997 under their own independent label. They were followed by PESCOZADA and later by Crooked Stilo.

== Discography ==
- Revolucion Del Bajo Mundo (2009)
- Spark la Musica (2005)
- Nuevo Musicon (2003)
- STILO IMPEREAL (1997)

== See also ==
- Salvadoran hip hop
