= Francisco Palaviccini =

Salvadorean composer and musician

Francisco Palvaccini
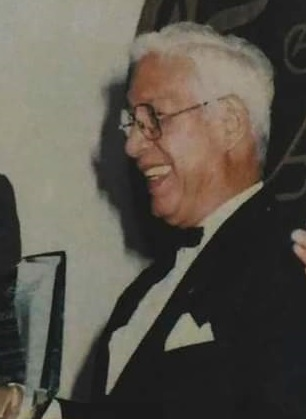
- Born: Francisco Palaviccini Sandoval; February 28, 1912; Santa Ana, El Salvador
- Died: February 24, 1996 (aged 83); San Salvador, El Salvador
- Occupations: Composer and singer

Francisco Palaviccini Sandoval (February 28, 1912 – February 24, 1996), also known as "Paquito" Palaviccini, was a Salvadoran composer and singer. Among his best known compositions are "Adentro Cojutepeque", "El Xuc", "El Carnaval en San Miguel", "Santa Ana Mía", "El Café de Mi Tierra", "Usulután", and "Cocotero Sonsonateco".

In his childhood, he studied violin with his father, who was a musician of Italian descent. In 1923 he entered the National Conservatory of El Salvador, where he deepened his knowledge of music theory. In 1928 he traveled to Guatemala to continue in the Conservatorio Nacional Germán Alcántara, studying musical composition. In 1934, he traveled to Cuba where he lived for five years and studied at the "Ignacio Acevedo" Academy of Havana.

In the 1940s, he traveled across the United States and South America as part of La Revista Musical of the Cuban Ernesto Lecuona. He returned to El Salvador in the 50s, to lead the Orquesta Internacional Polío from 1958. In 1960 he founded the band "Los Palaviccini". He was also director of the Orchestra of the University of El Salvador (Orquesta de la Universidad de El Salvador) (1970-1973) and joined the group "Bossa" in 1982.

In recognition of his musical career, he was named "Most Deserving Son of El Salvador" in 1992, by the Legislative Assembly of El Salvador. El Salvador music.

== Popular culture ==
On the B side of P. D. Q. Bach's LP, The Stoned Guest, there is a mention of Palaviccini in the context of naming operas with characters named Carmen in them.
