= Mecate (band) =

Rap music group from El Salvador

Mecate are a rap music group from El Salvador.

== History ==
The band was born at some stage during 1998 in Jorge Manuel's (a.k.a. "Piocha") house. Piocha was a talented guitarist with some exposure to the Salvadoran rock scene who often experiment musically with Ernesto Asecas ("Neto") and Enrique Salopino ("Pino") who both lacked musical background and had only recently been exposed to hip-hop music.

With time the experiment took a more defined shape and added new recruits, including drummer Carlos Alfredo (alias "Kalimba"), Rafa, and chorus girl and dancing king Jose Manuel ("Lady"). The sessions culminated in an ill-fated performance during a school event in the Salvadoran British School (ABC), where the band performed their original track "Armando Pleito." Audience members were reported to have been "thoroughly disgusted" by the lack of skill, talent, and "any sort of entertainment value whatsoever"; backstage the band was escorted by the event organizer and invited to retire from the music scene indefinitely.

But their ingenuity kept them going, and with the aid of Fruity Loops software, Neto, Lady, and Kique began to prepare some home-brewed tracks. Only after several attempts did the band manage to get some of their tracks on the air.

With the single "El Directo", Mecate tapped a vein in the country's conscience, by playing in the mainstream's ears the story of a heavily controversial underaged gang-member accused of at least 18 killings. The title created serious debate in the local media, including a ruling by the Interior Minister to ban it from the airwaves.

The band disbanded in order to pursue academic studies. However, thanks to the Internet they kept making sporadic attempts to reenter the Salvadoran airwaves with a few tracks such as "Poder Latino" and "Prototipo" and eventually contributions with Pescozada for "Movimiento" and Ayutush for "Paranoia". At some stage the talented Demetrio Soto Martinez ("Demi") joined the group and laid down what are arguably some of the best verses to date in Latin hip-hop, with a unique rhyme style.
